= Carl von Breyer =

Carl Magnus von Breyer (Russian: Карл Евстафьевич Брейер; 20 August [O.S. 9 August] 1746 in Kuigatsi, Riga Governorate – 10 May [O.S. 28 April] 1813 in Reval/Tallinn, Governorate of Estonia) was a Baltic German naval officer and vice admiral of the Imperial Russian Navy.

== Life ==
Breyer was born at the Kuigatsi relay station, where his father was post commissioner. In 1763 he joined the cadet corps of the Imperial Russian Navy in Saint Petersburg. After being appointed the rank of Michman in 1769, he was commanded to join the Baltic Fleet that was sent to the Mediterranean under Admiral Grigory Spiridov to take part in the Russo-Turkish War (1768–1774), where he fought in the Battle of Chesma with the ship of the line Europa under the command of Captain Fedot Alexeevich Klokachev.

During his career, Breyer commanded several warships, both frigates and ships of the line. One of them was the 66-gun ship of the line Dmitrii Donskoi, which he commanded from 1786 to 1787. He participated in the Russo-Swedish War (1788–1790) in command of the 74-gun ship of the line Sviataya Elena (St. Helena), with which he fought in the Battle of Hogland, the Battle of Öland and the Battle of Reval, where his ship fought in the first line, as well as in the Battle of Vyborg Bay (1790).

After Russia joined the First Coalition against Revolutionary France, between 1795 and 1796, the St. Helena, still commanded by Breyer, cruised as Rear Admiral Mikhail Kondratievich Makarov's flagship in the North Sea.

In June 1799, shortly after Breyer himself had been promoted to Rear Admiral, he was commanded to equip a naval squadron as troop transports for the Anglo-Russian invasion of Holland. For this, he was assigned the Azia-class ships of the line Iona, Mikhail, and Panteleimon, the Tsar' Konstantin-class ship of the line Aleksandr Nevskii, the formerly Swedish prize ship of the line Ömheten, which had been captured in 1790, as well as the frigate Rafail from Admiral Pyotr Khanykov's squadron In addition to these, the frigates Venus and Revel, the rowing frigates Konstantin and Nikolai, as well as the transport ships Neptune and Minerva were placed under Breyer's command.

In 1802, he was promoted to the rank of vice admiral and appointed as port commander for Tallinn, a post that he held until his retirement in 1804. He spent the rest of his life in Tallinn.

== Honours and awards ==
- Imperial Russian Order of St. George, IV class (awarded 1785)
- Gold Sword for Bravery (awarded 1790)
- Imperial Russian Order of St. Anna, III class (awarded 1797)
- Imperial Russian Order of St. Anna, I class (awarded 1800)
