= List of ships of the line of Russia =

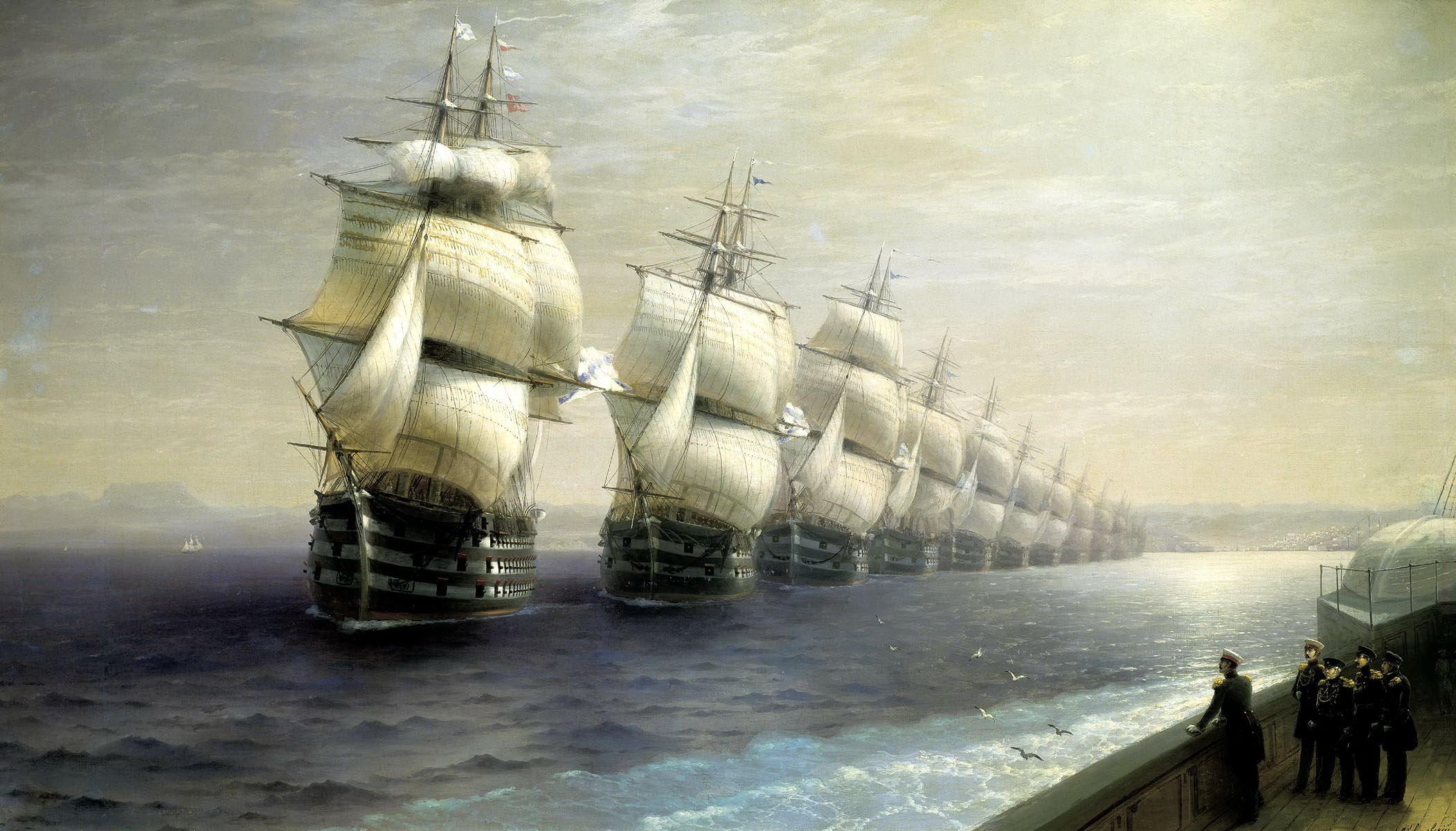
Ivan Konstantinovich Aivazovsky, Inspection of the Black Sea Fleet in 1849, 1886

This is a list of Russian ships of the line from the period 1668–1860:
The format is: Name, number of guns (rank/real amount), launch year (A = built in Arkhangelsk), fate (service = combat service, BU = broken up)

== Russian-built battleships ==
=== Early Russian Ships of the Line ===
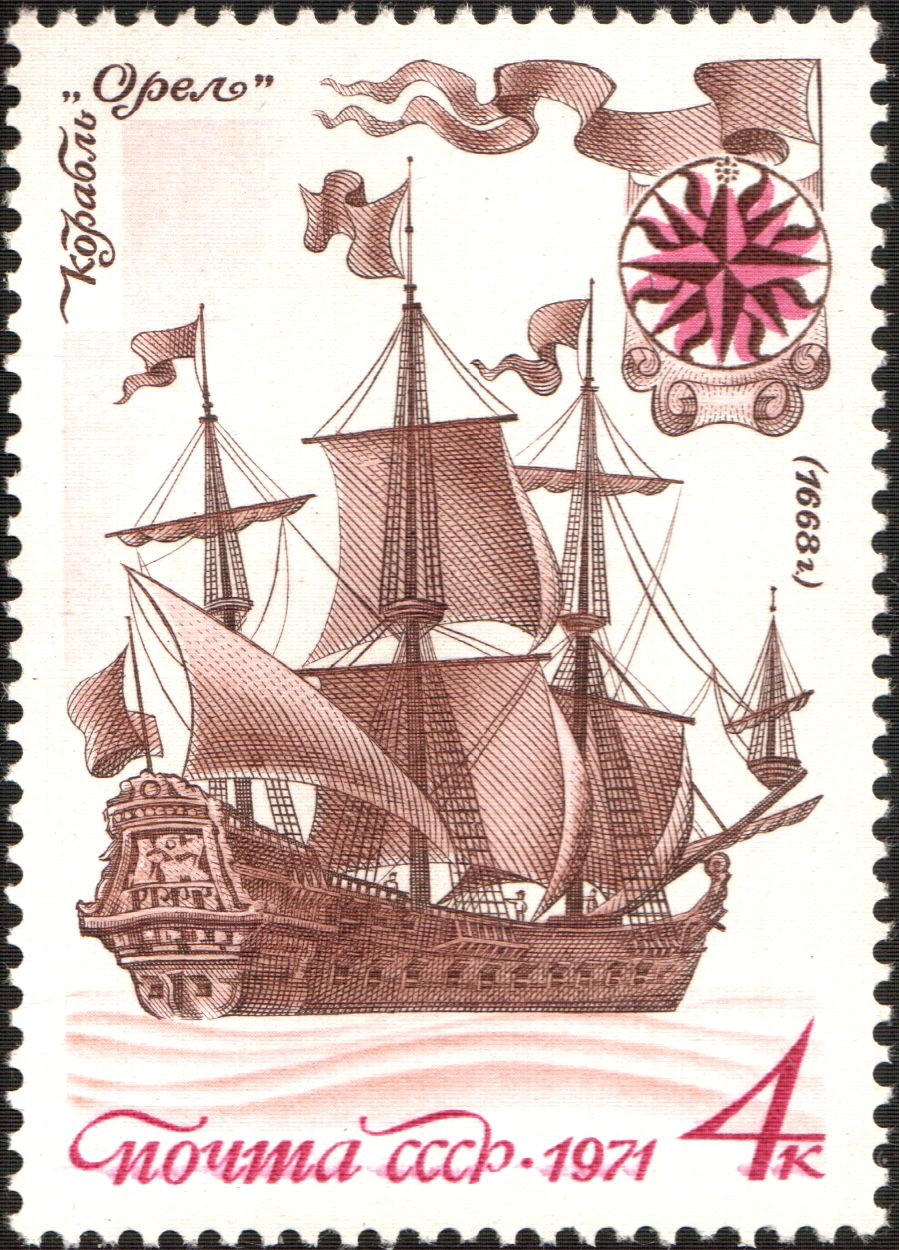
1971 Soviet postage stamp honoring the Oryol.

- Oryol 22 guns ("Орёл", launched May 1668, Caspian Sea) – Captured and badly burnt by Razin's rebels 1670, thereafter left to rot. Considered as the first Russian European-type large ship of war and by tradition related to the line-of-battleships.
- Mars 30 ("Марс", 1692, training vessel on Lake Pleshcheyevo) – Discarded 1723, burnt 1783

=== Battleships of the Azov Fleet (1696–1711) of Peter the Great ===
The first two vessels, while the first major warships of the Sea of Azov fleet (built at Voronezh), were in effect frigates, with their single battery of guns on the upper deck. They were designed for both sailing and rowing, and each had 15 pairs of oarports on the lower deck. They participated in the second Azov campaign (1696) but by 1710 they were derelict.

- Apostol Piotr 36 ("Апостол Пётр", April 1696) (sailing & rowing) – Abandoned at Azov to Turkey 1711
- Apostol Pavel 36 ("Апостол Павел", April 1696) (sailing & rowing) – Abandoned at Azov to Turkey 1711
- Kolokol (Klok – "Колокол", "Клок") 46 (1697) – BU 1710
- Liliya 36 ("Лилия", 1699) – BU 1710
- Bababan (Trummel – "Барабан", "Трумель") 36 (1699) – BU 1710
- Tri Riumki (Drie Rumor – "Три рюмки", "Дри рюмор") 36 (1699) – BU 1710
- Stul 36 ("Стул", 1699) – BU 1710
- Vesy 36 ("Весы", 1699) – BU 1710
- Yiozh (Igel – "Ёж", "Игель") 40 (1700) – BU 1710
- 6 anonymous 6-gun ships (1699) – Converted to provision vessels 1701, BU 1710
- Bezboyazn‘ (Onberfrest, Zondervrees, Sunderban — "Безбоязнь", "Онберфрест", "Сондерфрес", "Сундербан") 38 (1699) – BU 1710
- Blagoye Nachalo (Gut Anfangen, Goed Begin, De Segel Begin – "Благое Начало", "Гут-анфанген", "Гут-бегин", "Десегель-бегин") 36 (1699) – BU 1710
- Soyedineniye (Unia, Enihkeit – "Соединение", "Уния", "Энихкейт") 30 (1699) – Burnt 1711
- Sila (Strakt – "Сила", "Старкт") 36 (1699) – BU 1710
- Otvorennuye Vrata (Opon de Poort – "Отворённые врата", "Опон-де-порт") 36 (1699) – BU 1710
- Tsvet Voiny (Oorlah Bloem – "Цвет войны", "Орлах блюм") 36 (1699) – BU 1710
- Merkurii (Mercurius – "Меркурий", "Меркуриус") 22 (1699) – BU 1716
- Lev (Lev s sableyu – "Лев", "Лев с саблею") 44 (1699) – BU after 1710
- Yedinorog (Ein horn – "Единорог", "Ейн-горн") 44 (1699) – BU after 1710
- Gerkules 52 ("Геркулес", 1699) – BU 1710
- Vinogradnaya Vetv‘ (Wijn stok – "Виноградная ветвь", "Вейн-шток") 58 (1702) – BU after 1710
- Miach (Bal – "Мяч", "Бал") 54 (1702) – BU after 1710
- Krepost‘ (Zamok, Kastel‘, Citadel‘, Stargeit – "Крепость", "Замок", "Кастель", "Ситадель", "Старгейт") 52 (1699) – Sailed to Constantinople in 1699–1700 with ambassador Emelian Ukraintsev who managed the Treaty of Constantinople (1700), delivered to Turkey 1711
- Skorpion 52 ("Скорпион", 1699) – Flagship of admiral Fyodor Alexeyevich Golovin during Kerch Expediniton 1699, last mentioned 1700
- Flag 52 ("Флаг", 1699) – Burnt 1709
- Zvezda (Starn, Zolotaya Zvezda, De Goude Starn – "Звезда", "Штарн", "Золотая Звезда", "Дегоудестарн") 52 (1699) – BU 1709
- Dumkracht 44 ("Думкрахт", 1699) – BU 1710
- Strus 44 ("Струс", 1699) – BU 1710
- Kamen‘ 44 ("Камень", 1699) – BU 1710
- Slon (Olifant – "Слон", "Олифант") 44 (1699) – Delivered to Turkey 1711
- Rys‘ (Luks – "Рысь", "Лукс") 44 (1699) – BU after 1709
- Zhuravl‘ stereguschiy (Kroan opwacht – "Журавль стерегущий", "Кроан опвахт") 44 (1699) – BU after 1709
- Sokol (Falk – "Сокол", "Фалк") 44 (1699) – BU after 1709
- Sobaka (Treigun – "Собака", "Трейгун") 44 (1699) – BU after 1709
- Arfa 36 ("Арфа", 1699) – BU after 1719
- Granaat-apol 36 ("Гранат-аполь", 1699) – BU after 1709
- anonymous (known as "Italian") 70 – BU on slip 1700

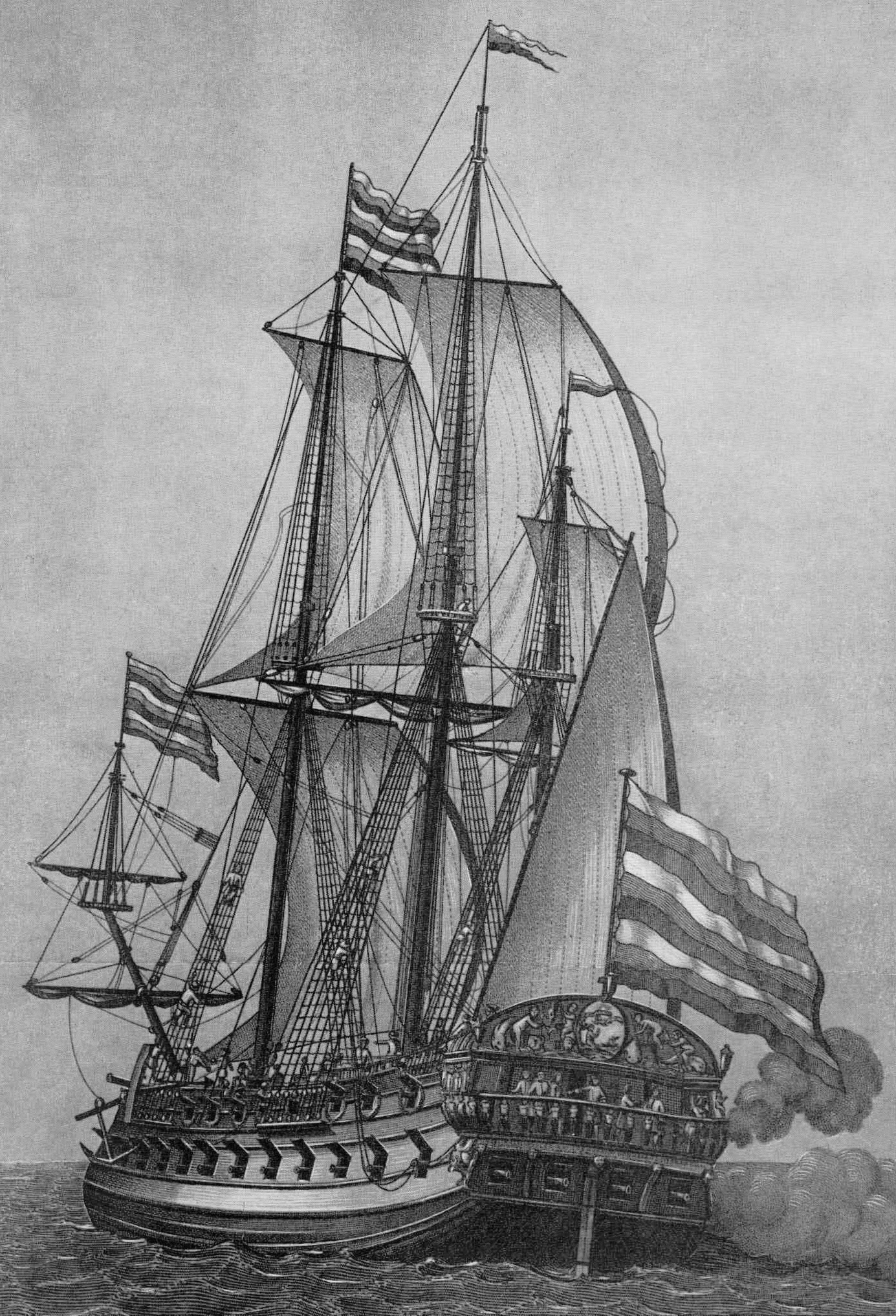
Goto Predestinatsiya

- Bozhiye Predvideniye (Goto Predestinatia – "Божие Предвидение", "Гото Предестинация") 58 (1700) – Flagship of vice-admiral Cornelius Cruys during Russo-Turkish War (1710–1711), sold to Turkey 1711
- Cherepaha (Schelpot – "Черепаха", "Шхельпот") 58 (1700) – BU 1727
- Sviatoi Georgii (Sant Iori – "Святой Георгий", "Сант Иорий") 66 (1701) – Delivered to Turkey 1711
- Razzhennoye Zhelezo (Git Ijzer – "Разженное железо", "Гит ейзер") 36 (1701) – BU after 1710
- Delfin 62 ("Дельфин", 1703) – BU 1716
- Vingelgak 62 ("Винкельгак", 1703) – BU 1716
- Voronezh 62 ("Воронеж", 1703) – BU 1710
- Samson 70 ("Самсон", 1704) – BU 1710
- Staryi Dub (Out Eiketbom – "Старый дуб", "Оут екетбом") 70 (1705) – BU 1727
- Aist (Ooievaar – "Аист", "Оифар") 64 (1706) – BU 1727
- Spiaschiy Lev (Slav Leeuw – "Спящий лев", "Шлав леу") 70 (1709) – BU 1727
- Lastka (Schwal – "Ластка", "Швал") 50 (1709) – Sold to Turkey 1711
- Shpaga (Degen – "Шпага", "Деген") 60 (1709) – Destroyed to prevent capture 1711
- Sulitsa (Lanz – "Копьё", "Ланц") 60 (1709) – BU 1727
- Skorpion 60 ("Скорпион", 1709) – BU 1727
- Tsvet Voiny (Oorlah Bloem – "Цвет войны", "Орлах блюм") 60 (1709) – BU 1727
- Staryi Oriol (Out Adler – "Старый орёл", "Оут адлер") 82 (1709) – BU 1727
- 4 anonymous 80-gun ships – BU on slip 1727
- 7 anonymous 48-gun ships – BU on slip 1727
- anonymous 24-gun ship – BU on slip 1727

=== Battleships of the Baltic Fleet (1703–1860) ===
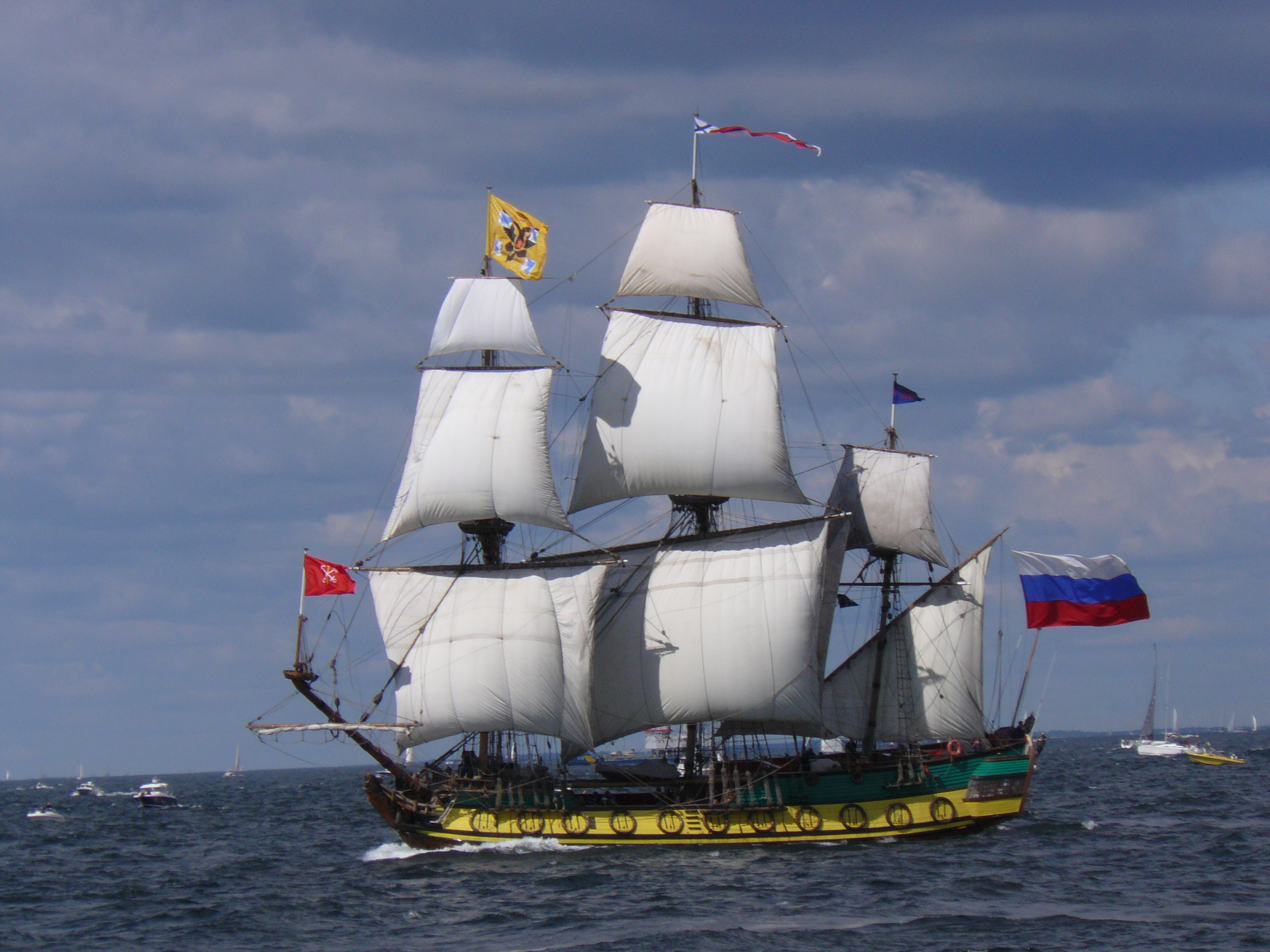
Modern exact replica (1999) of Shtandart (1703)

- Shtandart 28 ("Штандарт", 1703) – Reclassified to 28-gun frigate 1710, BU 1730

==== Shlissel‘burg-class (7 units) ====
All built at Olonetskaya Shipyard.

- Shlissel‘burg 28/24 ("Шлиссельбург", 1704) – Reclassified to 28-gun frigate 1710, BU after 1710
- Kronshlot 28/24 ("Кроншлот", 1704) – Reclassified to 28-gun frigate 1710, BU after 1710
- Peterburg 28/24 ("Петербург", 1704) – Reclassified to 28-gun frigate 1710, BU after 1710
- Triumf 28/24 ("Триумф", 1704) – Converted to fire-ship 1710
- Dorpat 28/24 ("Дерпт", 1704) – Converted to fire-ship 1710
- Narva 28/24 ("Нарва", 1704) – Reclassified to 28-gun frigate 1710, BU after 1710
- Fligel‘-de-Fam 28/24 ("Флигель-де-Фам", 1704) – Flagship of vice-admiral Cornelius Cruys at the Kronstadt defence 1705 during the Great Northern War, converted to fire-ship 1710

==== Mikhail Arkhangel-class (2 units) ====
Both built at Syass'kaya Shipyard

- Mikhail Arkhangel 28 ("Михаил Архангел", 1704) – Reclassified to 28-gun frigate 1710, BU after 1710
- Ivan-gorod 28 ("Иван-город", 1705) – Reclassified to 28-gun frigate 1710, BU after 1710
- Olifant 32 ("Олифант", 1705) – Reclassified to 36-gun frigate 1710, BU 1712
- Dumkrakht 32 ("Думкрат", 1707) – Reclassified to 36-gun frigate 1710, BU 1713

==== Riga-class (4 units) ====
- Riga 50 ("Рига", 1710) – BU 1721
- Vyborg 50 ("Выборг", 1710) – Wrecked and burnt to prevent capture 1713
- Pernov 50 ("Пернов", 1711) – BU 1721
- anonymous 50 (1711) – Wrecked 1712
- Poltava 54 ("Полтава", 1712) – BU 1732

==== Gavriil-class (3 units) ====
- Gavriil 52 ("Гаврил", 1713, A) – BU 1721
- Rafail 52 ("Рафаил", 1713, A) – BU 1724
- Arkhangel Mikhail 54 ("Архангел Михаил", 1713, A) – BU 1722

==== Sviataya Ekaterina-class (3 units) ====
- Sviataya Ekaterina 60 ("Святая Екатерина", 1713) – Renamed Vyborg ("Выборг") 1721, converted to praam 1727
- Shlissel‘burg 60 ("Шлиссельбург", 1714) – BU after 1736
- Narva 60 ("Нарва", 1714) – Lightning 1715 (lost 318 men)
- Ingermanland 64 ("Ингерманланд", 1715) – memorial ship 1724, BU after 1739. Ingermanland is a Russian tsar sailing battleship. It marks the beginning of Russia's great plan for ship construction. It was constructed in 1712, launched in 1715 and became the flagship of Peter the Great in the campaigns of 1716 and 1721 during the Great Northern War. It has a 46.02 meter and 12.8 meter wide deck and 5.56 meter hull height.

==== Uriil-class (4 units) ====
- Uriil 52 ("Уриил", 1715, A) – Sold for BU in Amsterdam 1722
- Varakhail 52 ("Варахаил", 1715, A) – BU 1724
- Selafail 52 ("Селафаил", 1715, A) – BU 1724
- Yagudiil 52 ("Ягудиил", 1715, A) – Sold for BU in Amsterdam 1722
- Sviatoi Aleksandr 70/76 ("Святой Александр", 1717) – Flagship of admiral Zakhar Mishukov at Russo-Swedish War (1741–1743) in 1742, BU after 1746
- Revel‘ 68 ("Ревель", 1717) – BU 1732
- Neptunus 70/78 ("Нептунус", 1718) – BU 1732
- Lesnoye 90 ("Лесное", 1718) – Damaged at the storm and BU 1741
- Gangut 90/92 ("Гангут", 1719) – BU 1736

==== Isaak-Viktoriya-class (2 units) ====
- Isaak-Viktoriya 66 ("Исаак-Виктория", 1719) – BU after 1739
- Astrakhan‘ 66 ("Астрахань", 1720) – BU 1736

==== Nord-Adler-class (2 units) ====
- Nord-Adler 80/88 ("Норд-Адлер", 1720) – BU after 1740
- Sviatoi Andrei 80/88 ("Святой Андрей", 1721) – BU after 1740
- Friedrichstadt 90/96 ("Фридрихштадт", 1720) – BU 1736
- Sviatoi Piotr 80/88 ("Святой Пётр", 1720) – BU 1736
- Fridemaker 80/88 ("Фридемакер", 1721) – BU 1736
- Sviataya Ekaterina 66/70 ("Святая Екатерина", 1721) – BU 1736
- Panteleimon-Viktoriya 66 ("Пантелеймон-Виктория", 1721) – BU 1736

==== Sankt-Mikhail-class (4 units) ====
All four built at St Petersburg.

- Sankt-Mikhail 54 ("Санкт-Михаил", 1723) – BU after 1739
- Rafail 54 ("Рафаил", 1724) – BU after 1739
- Ne Tron‘ Menia (also Noli me tangere – "Не тронь меня") 54 (1725) – BU after 1739
- Riga 54 ("Рига", 1729) – Converted to hospital ship 1746
- Derbent 64/66 ("Дербент", 1724) – BU after 1739
- Narva 64/66 ("Нарва", 1725) – BU after 1739
- Sviataya Natal'ya 66 ("Святая Наталья", 1727) – BU 1739
- Piotr I i II 100 ("Пётр I и II", 1727) – Flagship of Russian admiral Thomas Gordon during the Siege of Danzig (1734), BU 1752

==== Piotr II-class (19 units) ====
- Piotr II 54 ("Пётр II", 1728) – BU after 1739
- Vyborg 54 ("Выборг", 1729) – BU after 1739
- Novaya Nadezhda 54 ("Новая Надежда", 1730) – BU 1747
- Gorod Arkhangel‘sk 54 ("Город Архангельск", 1735, A) – BU 1749
- Severnaya Zvezda 54 ("Северная Звезда", 1735, A) – BU 1749
- Neptunus 54 ("Нептунус", 1736, A) – BU after 1750
- Azov 54 ("Азов", 1736) – BU 1752
- Astrakhan‘ 54 ("Астрахань", 1736) – BU 1752
- Sviatoi Andrei 54 ("Святой Андрей", 1737, A) – VU after 1752
- Kronshtadt 54 ("Кронштадт", 1738, A) – BU 1755
- Sviatoi Panteleimon 54 ("Святой Пантелеймон", 1740) – BU 1756
- Sviatoi Isaakii 54 ("Святой Исаакий", 1740, A) – BU 1756
- Sviatoi Nikolai 54 ("Святой Николай", 1748, A) – Renamed Sviatoy Nikolay vtotoy ("Святой Николай второй") 1754, BU after 1762
- Varakhiil 54 ("Варахиил", 1749, A) – Wrecked 1749
- Shlissel‘burg 54 ("Шлиссельбург", 1752, A) – BU 1765
- Varakhiil 54 ("Варахиил", 1752, A) – BU 1763
- Neptunus 54 ("Нептунус", 1758, A) – Discarded 1771
- Gorod Arkhangel‘sk 54 ("Город Архангельск", 1761, A) – BU after 1774
- Aziya 54 ("Азия", 1768, A) – Lost in Aegean Sea 1773 (lost 439 men)

==== Slava Rossii-class (59 units) ====
- Slava Rossii 66 ("Слава России", 1733) – BU 1752
- Severnyi Oryol 66 ("Северный Орёл", 1735) – BU 1763
- Revel‘ 66 ("Ревель", 1735) – BU 1752
- Ingermanland 66 ("Ингерманланд", 1735) – BU 1752
- Osnovaniye Blagopoluchiya 66 ("Основание Благополучия", 1736) – BU 1752
- Leferm 66 ("Леферм", 1739, A) – BU 1756
- Schastiye 66 ("Счастие") (ex-Generalissimus Rossiyskiy ("Генералиссимус Российский") – renamed on slip) (1741, A) – BU 1756
- Blagopoluchiye 66 ("Благополучие") (ex-Pravitel'nitsa Rossiyskaya ("Правительница Российская") – renamed on slip) (1741, A) – Converted to harbour lighter 1744, BU 1748
- Sviatoi Piotr 66 ("Святой Пётр") (ex-Ioann ("Иоанн")- renamed on slip) (1741) – Flagship of admiral count Nikolai Golovin at Russo-Swedish War (1741–1743) in 1743, BU 1756
- Sviataia Ekaterina 66 ("Святая Екатерина", 1742, A) – BU 1756
- Fridemaker 66 ("Фридемакер", 1742, A) – BU 1756
- Lesnoi 66 ("Лесной", 1743, A) – BU 1759
- Poltava 66 ("Полтава", 1743, A) – BU 1756
- Arkhangel Rafail 66 ("Архангел Рафаил", 1744, A) – BU 1758
- Sviataya Velokomuchenitsa Varvara 66 ("Святая Великомученица Варвара", 1745) – BU 1755
- Sviatoi Sergii 66 ("Святой Сергий", 1747, A) – BU 1763
- Sviatoi Aleksandr Nevskii 66 ("Святой Александр Невский", 1749) – BU 1763
- Ioann Zlatoust 66 ("Иоанн Златоуст", 1740) – Renamed Ioann Zlatoust vtoroy ("Иоанн Златоуст второй") 1751, BU 1759
- Arkhangel Gavriil 66 ("Архангел Гавриил", 1749, A) – BU 1763
- Arkhangel Uriil 66 ("Архангел Уриил", 1749, A) – BU 1763
- Moskva 66 ("Москва", 1750, A) – Wrecked 1758, found by divers 1893
- Ingermanland 66 ("Ингерманланд", 1752, A) – BU 1765
- Nataliya 66 ("Наталия", 1754, A) – BU 1771
- Poltava 66 ("Полтава", 1754, A) – Sank in harbour from leak 1770
- Astrakhan 66 ("Астрахань", 1756, A) – Wrecked 1760
- Revel‘ 66 ("Ревель", 1756, A) – BU 1771
- Rafail 66 ("Рафаил", 1758, A) – BU 1771
- anonymous 66 (1758, A) – Wrecked 1758 before she could be named
- Moskva 66 ("Москва", 1760, A) – BU 1771
- Sviatoi Piotr 66("Святой Пётр", 1760, A) – Burnt 1764
- Sviatoi Iakov 66 ("Святой Иаков", 1761, A) – BU 1774
- Sviatoi Aleksandr Nevskiy 66 ("Святой Александр Невский", 1762, A) – Burnt 1764
- Ne Tron‘ Menia 66 ("Не тронь меня", 1763, A) – Converted to frigate 1772, sold for BU in Livorno 1775
- Severnyi Oryol 66 ("Северный Орёл", 1763, A) – Sold for BU in England 1770
- Sviatoi Evstafii Plakida 66 ("Святой Евстафий Плакида", 1763) – Was the flagship (2nd flag) and blew up at the Battle of Chesma (1770)
- Sviatoi Ianuarii 66 ("Святой Иануарий", 1763) – Sold for BU in Naousa 1775
- Saratov 66 ("Саратов", 1765, A) – BU 1786
- Tver‘ 66 ("Тверь", 1765, A) – BU after 1776
- Triokh Ierarkhov 66 ("Трёх Иерархов", 1766) – Flagship of General-in-Chief count Alexei Orlov at the Battle of Chesma (1770), discarded 1786
- Triokh Sviatitelei 66 ("Трёх Святителей", 1766) – Sold for BU in Naousa 1775
- Evropa 66 ("Европа", 1768, A) – BU after 1791
- Vsevolod 66 ("Всеволод", 1769, A) – Burnt 1779
- Rostislav 66 ("Ростислав", 1769, A) – BU 1782
- Sviatoi Georgii Pobedonosets 66 ("Святой Георгий Победоносец", 1770) – BU 1780
- Graf Orlov 66 ("Граф Орлов", 1770, A) – BU 1791
- Pamiat‘ Evstafiya 66 ("Память Евстафия", 1770, A) – BU 1791
- Pobeda 66 ("Победа", 1770, A) – BU 1780
- Viktor 66 ("Виктор", 1771, A) – BU 1791
- Viacheslav 66 ("Вячеслав", 1771, A) – BU after 1784
- Dmitrii Donskoi 66 ("Дмитрий Донской", 1771, A) – BU 1791
- Mironosits (also Sviatykh Zhion Mironosits — "Мироносиц" or "Святых жён мироносиц") 66 (1771) – BU 1791
- Svyatoi Kniaz‘ Vladimir 66 ("Святой Князь Владимир", 1771) – BU after 1791
- Aleksandr Nevskii 66 ("Александр Невский", 1772, A) – BU 1784
- Boris i Gleb 66 ("Борис и Глеб", 1772, A) – Damaged in collision 1778, BU 1789
- Preslava 66 ("Преслава", 1772, A) – BU 1791
- Deris‘ 66 ("Дерись", 1772, A) – BU 1791
- Ingermanlandiya 66 ("Ингерманландия", 1773, A) – BU 1784
- Spiridon 66 ("Спиридон", 1779) – BU 1791
- David Selunskii 66 ("Давид Селунский", 1779) – BU after 1786
- Imperatritsa Anna 110/114 ("Императрица Анна", 1737) – BU 1752

==== Sviatoi Pavel-class (10 units) ====
- Sviatoi Pavel 80 ("Святой Павел", 1743) – BU 1756
- Ioann Zlatoust pervyi 80 ("Иоанн Златоуст первый", 1751) – BU 1769
- Sviatoi Nikolai 80 ("Святой Николай", 1754) – Flagship of admiral Zakhar Mishukov in 1758 during the Seven Years' War, BU 1769
- Sviatoi Pavel 80 ("Святой Павел", 1755) – Flagship of admiral Zakhar Mishukov in 1757 during the Seven Years' War, BU 1769
- Sviatoi Andrei Pervozvannyi 80 ("Святой Андрей Первозванный", 1758) – BU 1785
- Sviatoi Kliment Papa Rimskii 80 ("Святой Климент Папа Римский", 1758) – Flagship of admiral Andrey Polianskiy in 1760 during the Seven Years' War, BU 1780
- Kir Ioann ("Кир Иоанн") (ex-Friedrich Rex ("Фридрих Карл") – renamed on slip) 80 (1762) – Discarded after 1769
- Sviataya Ekaterina ("Святая Екатерина") (ex-Prinz Georg ("Принц Георг") – renamed on slip) 80 (1762) – Discarded after 1769
- Sviatoslav 80 ("Святослав", 1769) – Cut down as 2-decker 72-gun battleship in England 1769, flagship (3rd flag) at the Battle of Chesma (1770), wrecked and scuttled to prevent capture 1770
- Ches‘ma (also Sviatoi Ioann Krestitel‘ – "Чесьма" or "Святой Иоанн Креститель") 80 (1770) – BU 1781
- Zakharii i Elisavet 100 ("Захарий и Елисавет", 1748) – BU 1759
- Sviatoi Dmitrii Rostovskii 100 ("Святой Дмитрий Ростовский", 1758) – Flagship of admiral Zakhar Mishukov in 1760 during the Seven Years' War, BU 1772

==== Sviatoi Velikomuchenik Isidor-class (2 units) ====
- Sviatoi Velikomuchenik Isidor 74 ("Святой Великомученик Исидор") (ex-Chesma ("Чесма") – renamed on slip) (1772) – BU 1784
- Sviatoi Velikomuchenik Panteleimon 74 ("Святой Великомученик Пантелеймон", 1772) – BU 1784
- Iezikil‘ 78 ("Иезикиль", 1773) – BU after 1797

==== Azia-class (28 units) ====
- Aziya 66 ("Азия", 1773, A) – BU after 1791
- Amerika 66 ("Америка", 1773, A) – BU after 1791
- Slava Rossii 66 ("Слава России", 1774, A) – Wrecked near Toulon 1780
- Blagopoluchiye 66 ("Благополучие", 1774, A) – BU 1793
- Tviordyi 66 ("Твёрдый", 1774, A) – BU 1791
- Sviatoi Nikolai 66 ("Святой Николай", 1775, A) – BU 1790
- Khrabryi 66 ("Храбрый", 1775, A) – BU 1793
- Sviatoi Ianuarii 66 ("Святой Иануарий", 1780, A) – BU 1815
- Ne Tron‘ Menia 66 ("Не тронь меня", 1780, A) – Hulked 1803
- Pobedonosets 66 ("Победоносец", 1780) – BU 1807
- Sviatoslav 66 ("Святослав", 1781, A) – BU after 1800
- Triokh Sviatitelei 66 ("Трёх Святителей", 1781, A) – BU 1801
- Vysheslav (ship) 66 ("Вышеслав", 1782, A) – Wrecked and burnt to prevent capture 1789
- Rodislav 66 ("Родислав", 1782, A) – Wrecked 1789
- Boleslav 66 ("Болеслав", 1783, A) – BU 1808
- Mecheslav 66 ("Мечеслав", 1783, A) – BU after 1794
- Panteleimon 66 ("Пантелеймон", 1786, A) – BU after 1804
- Severnyi Oriol 66 ("Северный Орёл", 1787, A) – Wrecked and destroyed to prevent capture 1789
- Prokhor 66 ("Прохор", 1788, A) – BU after 1795
- Parmen 66 ("Пармен", 1789, A) – BU 1799
- Nikanor 66 ("Никанор", 1789, A) – Last mentioned 1796
- Pimen 66 ("Пимен", 1789, A) – BU 1799
- Iona 66 ("Иона", 1790, A) – BU 1803
- Filipp 66 ("Филипп", 1790, A) – BU 1803
- Graf Orlov 66 ("Граф Орлов", 1791, A) – Renamed Mikhail ("Михаил") 1796, BU 1809
- Evropa 66 ("Европа", 1793, A) – BU 1811
- Aziya 66 ("Азия", 1796, A) – Transferred to the Black Sea Fleet 1801, sold to France in Trieste 1809
- Pobeda 66 ("Победа", 1797, A) – Transferred to the Black Sea Fleet 1801, BU after 1816
- Isiaslav 66 ("Изяслав", 1784, A) – an experimental design by Adm. Greig; converted to 74-gun ship in 1800, BU 1808

==== Tsar' Konstantin-class (4 units) ====
- Tsar‘ Konstantin 74 ("Царь Константин", 1779) – Discarded after 1797
- Pobedoslav 74 (also Simon Srodnik Gospodnia – "Победослав" or "Симон Сродник Господня") (1782) – BU 1804
- Sviataya Elena 74 ("Святая Елена", 1785) – Interned by Britain 1808, released and sold to Britain 1813
- Aleksandr Nevskii 74 ("Александр Невский", 1787, A) – Converted to floating craine 1804, BU 1814
- Ioann Bogoslov 74 ("Иоанн Богослов", 1783) – BU 1791

==== Chesma-class (9 units) ====
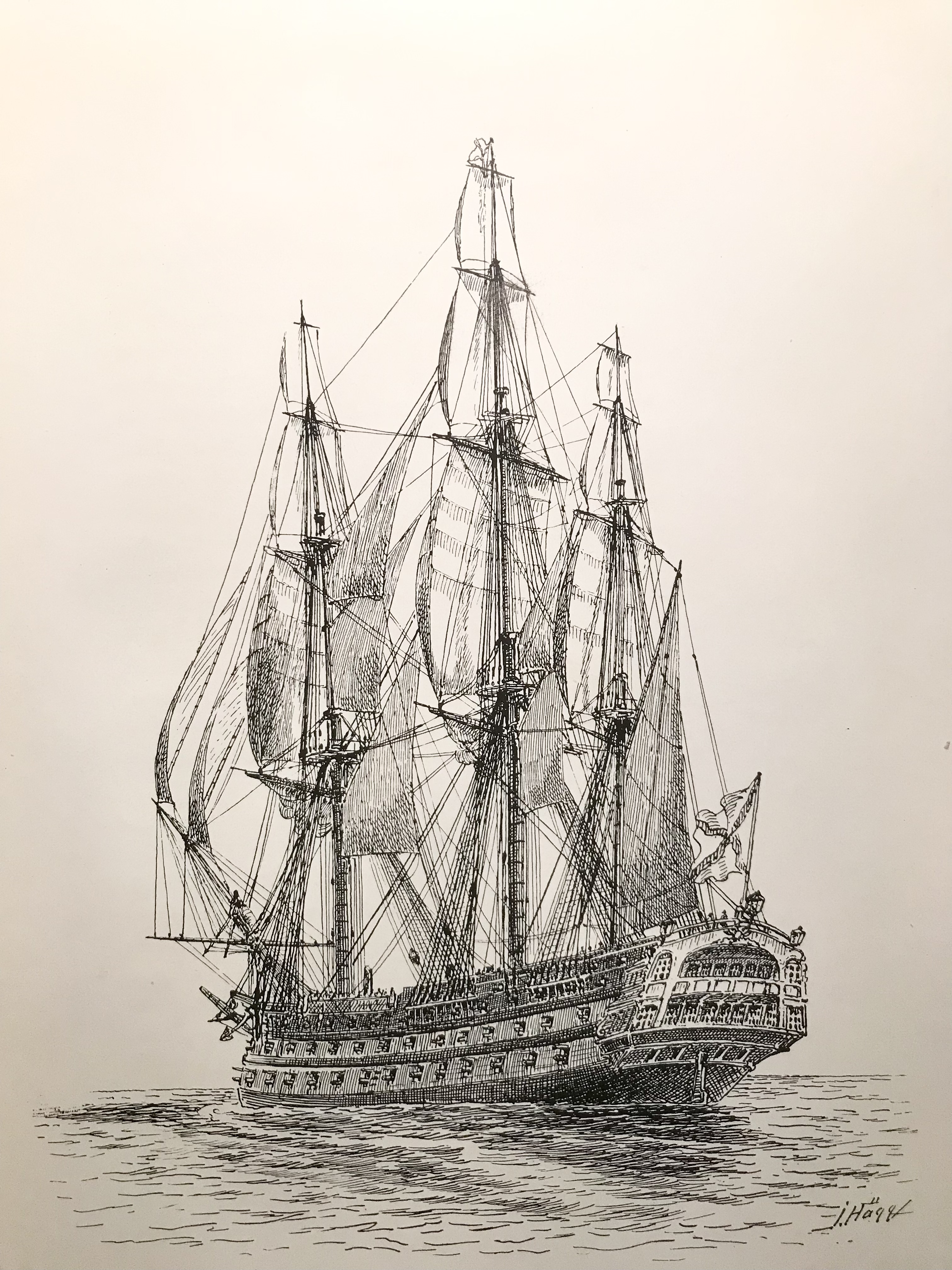
Rostislav by Jacob Hägg

- Ches‘ma (also Ioann Krestitel‘ – "Чесьма" or "Иоанн Креститель") 100 (1783) – Flagship of admiral Andrei Kruz at the Kronstadt Battle (1790), BU 1806
- Triokh Ierarkhov 100 ("Трёх Иерархов", 1783) – Discarded after 1796
- Rostislav 100 ("Ростислав", 1784) – Flagship of admiral Samuil Greig at the Battle of Hogland (1788), flagship of admiral Vasili Chichagov at the Battle of Öland (1789), Battle of Reval (1790) and Battle of Vyborg Bay (1790), BU after 1805
- Saratov 100 ("Саратов", 1785) – Hulked as hospital ship 1804
- Dvu-na-desiat‘ Apostolov 100 ("Дву-на-десять Апостолов", 1788) – BU 1802
- Sviatoi Ravno-apostol‘nyi Kniaz‘ Vladimir 100 ("Святой Равно-апостольный князь Владимир", 1788) – BU 1802
- Sviatoi Nikolai Chudotvorets 100 ("Святой Николай Чудотворец", 1789) – BU 1807
- Evsevii 100 ("Евсевий", 1790) – BU 1803
- anonymous 100 – BU on slip 1798

==== Yaroslav-class (19 units) ====
- Yaroslav 74 ("Ярослав", 1784, A) – BU 1798
- Vladislav 74 ("Владислав", 1784, A) – Captured by Sweden after the Battle of Hogland (1788), renamed HMS Vladislaff, discarded 1819
- Vseslav 74 ("Всеслав", 1785, A) – BU 1798
- Mstislav 74 ("Мстислав", 1785, A) – BU 1811
- Kir Ioann 74 ("Кир Иоанн", 1785, A) – BU 1798
- Sviatoi Piotr 74 ("Святой Пётр", 1786, A) – BU 1803
- Sysoi Velikii 74 ("Сысой Великий", 1788, A) – BU 1804
- Maksim Ispovednik 74 ("Максим Исповедник", 1788, A) – BU 1804
- Boris 74 ("Борис", 1789, A) – Hulked as depot 1802
- Gleb 74 ("Глеб", 1789, A) – Converted to hospital ship 1805
- Aleksei 74 ("Алексей", 1790, A) – Hulked 1808, BU 1815
- Piotr 74 ("Пётр", 1790, A) – BU 1821
- Pamiat‘ Evstafiya 74 ("Память Евстафия", 1791, A) – BU 1817
- Isidor 74 ("Исидор", 1795, A) – Transferred to the Black Sea Fleet 1801, BU 1812
- Vsevolod 74 ("Всеволод", 1796, A) – Destroyed in the action near Baltiyskiy Port (1808) during the Anglo-Russian War (1807–1812)
- Severnyi Oriol 74 ("Северный Орёл", 1797, A) – BU 1809
- Moskva 74 ("Москва", 1799, A) – Sold to France in Toulon 1809
- Yaroslav 74 ("Ярослав", 1799, A) – Interned by Britain 1808, released and sold to Britain 1813
- Sviatoi Piotr 74 ("Святой Пётр", 1799, A) – Sold to France in Toulon 1809
- Elisaveta 74 ("Елисавета", 1795) – BU 1817
- Blagodat‘ 130 ("Благодать", 1800) – Flagship of admiral Pyotr Khanykov in 1808 during the Anglo-Russian War (1807–1812), BU 1814
- Rafail 80/82 ("Рафаил", 1800) – Interned by Britain 1808 and non released
- Zachatiye Sviatoi Anny 74 ("Зачатие Святой Анны", 1800) – BU 1810
- Arkhistratig Mikhail 72/64 ("Архистратиг Михаил", 1800) – Converted to transport vessel 1813, BU 1817
- Gavriil 100 ("Гавриил", 1802) – BU 1819
- Uriil 80 ("Уриил", 1802) – Sold to France in Trieste 1809

==== Selafail-class (23 units) ====
- Selafail 74 ("Селафаил", 1803) – Flagship of vice-admiral Dmitry Senyavin during the Adriatic Sea Campaign (1806), interned by Britain 1808, released and sold to Britain 1813
- Sil‘nyi 74 ("Сильный", 1804, A) – Interned by Britain 1808, released 1813, BU 1819
- Oriol 74 ("Орёл", 1807, A) – BU 1833
- Severnaya Zvezda 74 ("Северная Звезда", 1807, A) – Damaged during flood in Kronstadt (1824), BU 1827
- Borei 74 ("Борей", 1807, A) – Damaged during flood in Kronstadt (1824), BU 1829
- Ne Tron‘ Menia 74 ("Не тронь меня", 1809, A) – Damaged during flood in Kronstadt (1824), BU 1828
- Triokh Ierarkhov 74 ("Трёх Иерархов", 1809, A) – Damaged during flood in Kronstadt (1824), hulked as depot 1827
- Sviatoslav 74 ("Святослав", 1809, A) – Damaged during flood in Kronstadt (1824), BU 1828
- Nord-Adler 74 ("Норд-Адлер", 1811, A) – Sold to Spain 1818, renamed España, stricken 1821
- Prints Gustav 74 ("Принц Густав", 1811, A) – Damaged during flood in Kronstadt (1824), BU 1827
- Berlin 74 ("Берлин", 1813, A) – Hulked as depot 1827
- Gamburg 74 ("Гамбург", 1813, A) – Damaged during flood in Kronstadt (1824), hulked as depot 1827
- Drezden 74 ("Дрезден", 1813, A) – Sold to Spain 1818, renamed Alejandro I, stricken 1823
- Liubek 74 ("Любек", 1813, A) – Sold to Spain 1818, renamed Numancia I, BU 1823
- Arsis 74 ("Арсис", 1816, A) – Damaged during flood in Kronstadt (1824), hulked as depot 1828
- Katsbakh 74 ("Кацбах", 1816, A) – Damaged during flood in Kronstadt (1824), hulked 1828
- Retvizan 74 ("Ретвизан", 1818, A) – BU 1833
- Triokh Sviatitelei 74 ("Трёх Святителей", 1819, A) – Damaged during flood in Kronstadt (1824), BU 1828
- Sviatoi Andrei 74 ("Святой Андрей", 1821, A) – Sunk as target vessel by admiral Karl Sсhilder's submarine 1840
- Sysoi Velikii 74 ("Сысой Великий", 1822, A) – BU 1837
- Prokhor 74 ("Прохор", 1823, A) – BU 1846
- Kniaz‘ Vladimir 74 ("Князь Владимир", 1824, A) – Hulked 1831
- Tsar‘ Konstantin 74 ("Царь Константин", 1825, A) – BU 1831
- Moschnyi 66 ("Мощный", 1805, A) – Interned by Britain 1808, released 1813, BU 1817
- Skoryi 66 ("Скорый", 1805) – Interned by Britain 1808, released and sold to Britain 1813
- Tviordyi 74 ("Твёрдый", 1805) – Flagship of vice-admiral Dmitry Senyavin at the Battle of the Dardanelles (1807) and Battle of Athos (1807), interned by Britain 1808, released and sold to Britain 1813
- Khrabryi 120 ("Храбрый", 1808) – Damaged during flood in Kronstadt (1824), BU 1829
- Smelyi 88 ("Смелый", 1808) – BU 1819
- Pobedonosets 64 ("Победоносец", 1809, A) – Hulked 1822

==== Vsevolod-class (2 units) ====
- Vsevolod 66 ("Всеволод", 1809, A) – Hulked 1820
- Saratov 66 ("Саратов", 1809, A) – Wrecked 1812

==== Pamiat' Evstafiya-class (2 units) ====
- Pamiat‘ Evstafiya 74 ("Память Евстафия", 1810) – BU 1828
- Chesma 74 ("Чесма", 1811) – BU 1828

==== Trekh Sviatitelei-class (7 units) ====
- Triokh Sviatitelei 74 ("Трёх Святителей", 1810) – Sold to Spain 1818, renamed Velasco, stricken 1821
- Mironisits 74 ("Мироносиц", 1811) – BU 1825
- Yupiter 74 ("Юпитер", 1812) – Damaged during flood in Kronstadt (1824), BU 1828
- Neptunus 74 ("Нептунус", 1813) – Sold to Spain 1818, renamed Fernando VII, stricken 1823
- Piotr 74 ("Пётр", 1814) – BU 1828
- Finland 74 ("Финланд", 1814) – Damaged during flood in Kronstadt (1824), BU 1828
- Fershampenuaz 74 ("Фершампенуаз", 1817) – Flagship of rear admiral Pyotr Rikord during the Civil conflict in Greece (1831), burnt 1831
- Rostislav 110 ("Ростислав", 1813) – BU 1827

==== Leipzig-class (2 units) ====
- Leipzig 110 ("Лейпциг", 1816) – Damaged during flood in Kronstadt (1824), hulked as depot 1825, BU 1832
- Tviordyi 110 ("Твёрдый", 1819) – Damaged during flood in Kronstadt (1824), BU 1828
- Emgeiten 84 ("Эмгейтен", 1820) – Renamed Kronshtadt ("Кронштадт") 1829, hulked 1835
- Emmanuil 84 ("Эммануил", 1824) – Sold to Greece 1830, BU 1832–33
- Gangut 84 ("Гангут", 1825) – Converted to screw 1854, training ship 1862, decommissioned 1871

==== Iezekiil‘-class (25 units) ====
- Iezekiil‘ 80 ("Иезекииль", 1826, A) – Hulked 1842, BU 1849
- Azov 74 ("Азов", 1826, A) – Russian flagship of admiral Login Geiden at the Battle of Navarino (1827) and during Russo-Turkish War (1828–1829) in Aegean Sea, BU 1831
- Aleksandr Nevskii 74 ("Александр Невский", 1826) – Cut down as 64-gun frigate 1832, hulked as depot 1846, BU 1847
- Velikii Kniaz‘ Mikhail 86 ("Великий Князь Михаил", 1827) – Converted to floating crane 1860, decommissioned 1863
- Katsbach 80 ("Кацбах", 1828, A) – BU 1857
- Kul‘m 90 ("Кульм", 1828, A) – BU 1857
- Arsis 80 ("Арсис", 1828) – Hulked 1854
- Lesnoye 80 ("Лесное", 1829, A) – Hulked as depot 1842
- Narva 80 ("Нарва", 1829, A) – Hulked 1844
- Brien 80 ("Бриен", 1829) – Decommissioned 1860
- Borodino 80 ("Бородино", 1830, A) – Hulked 1847
- Krasnoi 80 ("Красной", 1830, A) – Hulked 1844
- Berezino 80 ("Березино"", 1830) – BU 1860
- Smolensk 80 ("Смоленск", 1830) – Hulked as depot 1856
- Pamiat‘ Azova 86 ("Память Азова", 1831, A) – Hulked 1848, BU 1854
- Oriol 80 ("Орёл", 1833, A) – Hulked 1848
- Ostrolenka 80 ("Остроленка", 1834, A) – Hulked 1848
- Leipzig 80 ("Лейпциг", 1836, A) – Hulked 1850
- Retvizan 80 ("Ретвизан", 1839, A) – Hulked 1852
- Finland 80 ("Финланд", 1840, A) – BU 1857
- Ingermanland 74 ("Ингерманланд", 1842, A) – Wrecked 1842 (lost 329 men, women and children)
- Ingermanland ("Ингерманланд") (ex-Iezekil‘ ("Иезекиль") – renamed on slip) 74 (1844, A) – Decommissioned 1860
- Narva ("Нарва") (ex-Sviatoslav ("Святослав") – renamed on slip) 74 (1846, A) – Cut down as 58-gun frigate 1855, decommissioned 1863
- Pamiat‘ Azova 74 ("Память Азова", 1848, A) – Decommissioned 1863
- Sysoi Velikiy 74 ("Сысой Великий", 1849, A) – Cut down as 58-gun frigate 1855, decommissioned 1863

==== Imperator Aleksandr-class (3 units) ====
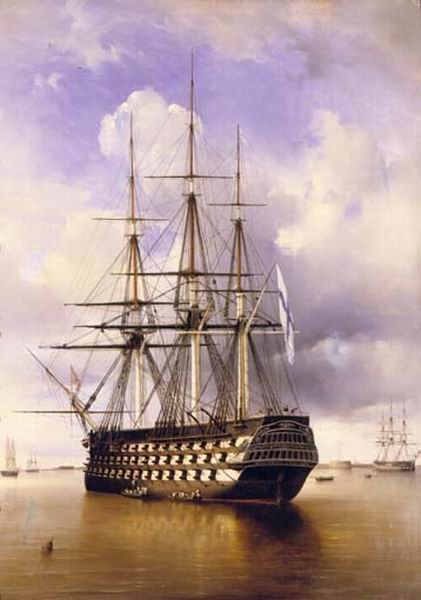
110-gun ship Imperator Aleksandr at Large Kronstadt road

- Imperator Aleksandr 110 ("Император Александр", 1827) – BU 1854
- Imperator Piotr I 110 ("Император Пётр I", 1829) – Decommissioned 1863
- Sviatoi Georgii Pobedonosets 110 ("Святой Георгий Победоносец", 1829) – BU 1858

==== Imperatritsa Aleksandra-class (8 units) ====
- Imperatritsa Aleksandra 84/96 ("Императрица Александра", 1827) – Decommissioned 1863
- Emgeiten 84/94 ("Эмгейтен", 1828) – BU 1858
- Poltava 84/90 ("Полтава", 1829) – Decommissioned 1860
- Ne Tron' Menia 84/92 ("Не тронь меня", 1832) – Decommissioned 1863
- Vladimir 84/92 ("Владимир", 1833) – Converted to floating crane 1860
- Lefort 84/94 ("Лефорт", 1835) – Wrecked 1857 (826 men, women and children lost)
- Vola 84/92 ("Вола", 1837) – Converted to screw 1856, later become training ship, stricken 1871
- Andrei 84/92 ("Андрей", 1844) – Hulked as floating barracks 1857, decommissioned 1861

==== Fershampenuaz-class (3 units) ====
- Fershampenuaz 74/82 ("Фершампенуаз", 1833) – Decommissioned 1860
- Konstantin 74/82 ("Константин", 1837) – Converted to screw 1854, decommissioned 1864
- Vyborg 74/82 ("Выборг", 1841) – Converted to screw 1854, decommissioned 1863
- Rossiya 120/128 ("Россия", 1839) – Hulked as floating barracks 1857, BU 1860
- Krasnoi 84 ("Красной", 1847) – Decommissioned 1863
- Iezekiil‘ 74 ("Иезекииль", 1847, A) – Hulked 1860, decommissioned 1863
- Prokhor 84 ("Прохор", 1851) – Artillery training ship 1858, decommissioned 1863
- Oriol 84 ("Орёл", 1854) (completed as screw) – Decommissioned in 1863
- Retvisan 84 ("Ретвизан", 1855) (completed as screw) – Converted to sail 1863, to target vessel 1874, decommissioned 1880

==== Borodino-class (2 units) ====
- Borodino 74 ("Бородино", 1850, A) – Cut down as 58-gun frigate 1855, decommissioned 1863
- Vilagosh 74 ("Вилагош", 1851, A) – Cut down as 58-gun frigate 1855, decommissioned 1863
- Imperator Nikolai I 111/109 ("Император Николай I", 1860) (screw) – Decommissioned 1874

=== Battleships of the Azov Flotilla (1770–83) of Catherine the Great ===
==== "New-invented" Type I (1 unit) ====
All eight "new-invented" ("новоизобретённый") units were flat-bottomed, two-mast (except Khotin), one-deck ships. Built in middle stream of Don River. Designed capable to sail downstream and to overpass river's sand-bar.

- Khotin 16 ("Хотин", 1770) – Flagship of vice-admiral Alexei Senyavin during the Russo-Turkish War (1768–1774), transferred to the Black Sea Fleet 1783, BU after 1787

==== "New-invented" Type II (7 units) ====
- Azov 16 ("Азов", 1770) – Transferred to the Black Sea Fleet 1783, BU after 1784
- Modon 16 ("Модон", 1770) – Transferred to the Black Sea Fleet 1783, BU after 1783
- Taganrog 16 ("Таганрог", 1770) – Wrecked 1782
- Moreya 16 ("Морея", 1770) – BU after 1774
- Novopavlovsk 16 ("Новопавловск", 1770) – BU after 1774
- Koron 16 ("Корон", 1770) – Wrecked 1782
- Zhurzha 16 ("Журжа", 1770) – Transferred to the Black Sea Fleet 1783, BU after 1784

=== Battleships of the Black Sea Fleet (1783–1855) ===
- Ekaterina 60 ("Екатерина") – BU on slip 1785

==== Slava Ekateriny-class (6 units) ====
- Slava Ekateriny 66 ("Слава Екатерины") 1783) – Renamed Preobrazheniye Gospodne ("Преображение Господне") 1788, flagship of rear admiral count Mark Voynovich at the Battle of Fidonisi (1788), BU after 1791
- Sviatoi Pavel 66 ("Святой Павел", 1784) – BU after 1794
- Mariya Magdalina 66 ("Мария Магдалина", 1785) – Heavily damaged at the storm and captured by Turkey near Bosporus 1787
- Aleksandr 66 ("Александр", 1786) – Wrecked 1786
- Vladimir 66 ("Владимир", 1787) – BU after 1804
- Iosif II 80 ("Иосиф II", 1787) – Renamed Rozhdestvo Christovo ("Рождество Христово")1790, flagship of rear admiral Fyodor Ushakov at the Battle of Kerch Strait (1790), Battle of Tendra (1790), and Battle of Cape Kaliakra (1791), BU 1800
- Sviatoi Georgii Pobedonostes 50/54 ("Святой Георгий Победоносец") 1785) – Reclassified to 50-gun frigate 1793, BU after 1800

==== Apostol Andrei-class (2 units) ====
- Apostol Andrei 50 ("Апостол Андрей") 1786) – Reclassified to 50-gun frigate 1793, converted to floating crane 1800
- Aleksandr Nevskii 50 ("Александр Невский", 1787) – Reclassified to 50-gun frigate 1793, discarded after 1799

==== Piotr Apostol-class (6 units) ====
- Piotr Apostol 50/46 ("Пётр Апостол", 1788) – Reclassified to 44-gun frigate 1793, BU after 1799
- Ioann Bogoslov 50/46 ("Иоанн Богослов", 1788) – Reclassified to 44-gun frigate 1793, burnt 1794
- Tsar‘ Konstantin 50/46 ("Царь Константин", 1789) – Reclassified to 44-gun frigate 1793, wrecked 1799 (399 men lost including rear admiral I. T. Ovtsyn)
- Fiodor Stratilat 50/46 ("Фёдор Стартилат", 1790) – Reclassified to 44-gun frigate 1793, wrecked 1799 (268 men lost)
- Soshestviye Sviatogo Dukha ("Сошествие Святого Духа") (ex-Sviataya Troitsa ("Святая Троица") – renamed on slip) 50/46 (1791) -Reclassified to 44-gun frigate 1793, discarded after 1802
- Kazanskaya Bogoroditsa 50/46 ("Казанская Богородица", 1791) – Reclassified to 44-gun frigate 1793, discarded after 1802
- Maria Magdalina pervaya 66 ("Мария Магдалина первая", 1789) – BU 1803
- Navarkhia (also Vozneseniye Gospodne — "Навархия" or "Вознесение Господне") 50/46 – Reclassified to 50-gun frigate 1793, discarded after 1802
- Sviatoi Nikolai 50/44 ("Святой Николай", 1790) – Reclassified to 44-gun frigate 1793, sold for BU in Naples 1802
- Bogoyavleniye Gospodne 66/72 ("Богоявление Господне", 1791) – BU 1804
- Sviataya Troitsa 66/72 ("Святая Троица") (ex-Soshestviye Sviatogo Dukha ("Сошествие Святого Духа") – renamed on slip) (1791) – BU after 1806
- Sviatoi Pavel 90/84/82 ("Святой Павел", 1794) – Flagship of admiral Fyodor Ushakov in Mediterranean Campaign (1798–1800) and Corfu assault (1799), BU 1810

==== Sviatoi Piotr-class (7 units) ====
- Sviatoi Piotr 74 ("Святой Пётр", 1794) – Hulked as depot 1803
- Zakharii i Elizavet 74 ("Захарий и Елизавет", 1795) – Hulked as depot 1803
- Simeon i Anna 74 ("Симеон и Анна", 1797) – Discarded after 1804
- Sviatoi Mikhail 74 ("Святой Михаил", 1798) – Hulked as hospital ship 1807, sold for BU in Corfu 1807
- Maria Magdalina vtoraya 74 ("Мария Магдалина вторая", 1799) – BU after 1810
- Tol‘skaya Bogoroditsa 74 ("Тольская Богородица", 1799) – Wrecked 1804 (164 men lost)
- Sviataya Paraskeva 74 ("Святая Параскева", 1799) – Sold to France in Trieste 1809
- Yagudiil 110 ("Ягудиил", 1800) – BU 1812
- Varakhiil 68 ("Варахиил", 1800) – BU 1813
- Ratnyi 110 ("Ратный", 1802) – Flagship of rear admiral Semyon Pustoshkin in 1807 during Russo-Turkish War (1806–1812), BU after 1825
- Pravyi 74/76 ("Правый", 1804) – Discarded after 1813

==== Anapa-class (11 units) ====
- Anapa 74 ("Анапа", 1807) – Hulked 1827
- Mariya 74 ("Мария", 1808) – BU after 1818
- Dmitrii Donskoi 74 ("Дмитрий Донской", 1807) – Discarded after 1818
- Aziya 74 ("Азия", 1810) – BU 1825
- Lesnoi (Lesnoye — "Лесной" or "Лесное") 74 (1811) – Hulked 1825
- Maksim Ispovednik 74 ("Максим Исповедник", 1812) – BU 1832
- Brien 74 ("Бриен", 1813) – Hulked 1826
- Kul‘m 74 ("Кульм", 1813) – Hulked 1826
- Krasnoi 74 ("Красной", 1816) – Hulked 1827
- Nikolai 74 ("Николай", 1816) – Hulked 1827
- Skoryi 74 ("Скорый", 1818) – BU after 1830

==== Poltava-class (3 units) ====
- Poltava 110 ("Полтава", 1808) – Flagship of rear admiral Gavriil Sarychev in 1810 and vice-admiral Roman Gall in 1811 during Russo-Turkish War (1806–1812), BU 1832
- Dvenadsat Apostolov 110 ("Двенадцать Апостолов", 1811) – BU 1832
- Parizh 110 ("Париж", 1814) – Hulked 1827
- Nord-Adler 74 ("Норд-Адлер", 1820) – BU 1839
- Imperator Frants 110 ("Император Франц", 1821) – BU 1832
- Pimen 74 ("Пимен", 1823) – Hulked 1839
- Rarmen 74/89 ("Пармен", 1823) – Hulked 1835, BU 1842
- Panteleimon 80 ("Пантелеймон", 1824) – Hulked 1838
- Ioann Zlatoust 74/83 ("Иоанн Златоуст", 1825) – Hulked 1841
- Derbent 110 ("Дербент", 1826) – Renamed Parizh ("Париж") 1827, Flagship of admiral Alexey Greig during Russo-Turkish War (1828–1829), hulked 1836, BU 1845

==== Imperatritsa Maria-class (3 units) ====
- Imperatritsa Mariya 84/96 ("Императрица Мария", 1827) – Hulked 1843
- Ches‘ma 84/91 ("Чесьма", 1828) – Hulked 1841
- Anapa 84/108 ("Анапа", 1829) – Converted to harbour vessel 1845, BU 1850
- Pamiat‘ Evstafiya 84/108 ("Память Евстафия", 1830) – Flagship of rear admiral Mikhail Lazarev at the Bosporus Expedition (1833), converted to harbour vessel 1845, BU 1850
- Adrianopol‘ 84/108 ("Адрианополь", 1830) – Converted to harbour vessel 1845, BU 1850
- Imperatritsa Ekaterina II 84/96 ("Императрица Екатерина II", 1831) – Converted to harbour vessel 1845, hulked 1847
- Varshava 120 ("Варшава", 1833) – BU 1850
- Silistriya 84/88 ("Силистрия", 1835) – Hulked 1852, scuttled to protect the harbour in 1854 during the Siege of Sevastopol

==== Sultan Makhmut-class (8 units) ====
- Sultan Makhmud 84 ("Султан Махмут", 1836) – Hulked 1852, BU 1854
- Trekh Ierarkhov 84 ("Трёх Иерархов", 1838) – BU 1854
- Arkhangel Gavriil 84 ("Гавриил", 1839) – Scuttled to protect the harbour in 1854 during the Siege of Sevastopol
- Selafail 84 ("Селафаил", 1840) – Scuttled to protect the harbour in 1854 during the Siege of Sevastopol
- Uriil 84 ("Уриил", 1840) – Scuttled to protect the harbour in 1854 during the Siege of Sevastopol
- Varna 84 ("Варна", 1842) – Scuttled to protect the harbour in 1854 during the Siege of Sevastopol
- Yagudiil 84 ("Ягудиил", 1843) – Scuttled in 1855 at Sevastopol, when Russian troops abandoned the city
- Sviatoslav 84 ("Святослав", 1845) – Hospital ship 1854, scuttled to protect the harbour in 1855 during the Siege of Sevastopol

==== Tri Sviatitelia ====
- Tri Sviatitelia 120/124 ("Три Святителя", 1838) – Scuttled to protect the harbour in 1854 during the Siege of Sevastopol

==== Dvenadsat Apostolov-class (3 units) ====
- Dvenadsat Apostolov 120/124 ("Двенадцать Апостолов", 1841) – Scuttled to protect the harbour in 1855 during the Siege of Sevastopol
- Parizh 120/124 ("Париж", 1849) – Scuttled in 1855 at Sevastopol, when Russian troops abandoned the city
- Velikii Kniaz‘ Konstantin 120/124 ("Великий Князь Константин", 1852) – Scuttled in 1855 at Sevastopol, when Russian troops abandoned the city

==== Rostislav ====
- Rostislav 84 ("Ростислав", 1844) – Scuttled to protect the harbour in 1855 during the Siege of Sevastopol

==== Khrabryi-class (2 units) ====
- Khrabryi 84 ("Храбрый", 1847) – Scuttled in 1855 at Sevastopol, when Russian troops abandoned the city
- Imperatritsa Maria 84 ("Императрица Мария", 1853) – Flagship of admiral Pavel Nakhimov at the Battle of Sinop (1853), scuttled in 1855 at Sevastopol, when Russian troops abandoned the city

==== Chesma ====
- Chesma 84 ("Чесьма", 1849) – Scuttled in 1855 at Sevastopol, when Russian troops abandoned the city

==== Tsearevitch ====
- Tsesarevitch 135/115 ("Цесаревич", 1857) – Transferred to the Baltic Fleet 1858–59, converted to screw 1860, decommissioned 1874

==== Sinop ====
- Sinop ("Синоп") (ex-Bosfor ("Босфор") – renamed on slip) 130 (1858) – Transferred to the Baltic Fleet 1858–59, converted to screw 1860, decommissioned 1874

== Russian prizes (line-of-battle ships captured from opponents) ==
- Vakhmeister 52 ("Вахмейстер", ex-Swedish HMS Wachtmeister 1681, captured in Battle of Osel Island 1719) – BU after 1728
- Rodos 60 ("Родос", ex-Turkish ?, captured in Battle of Chesma 1770) – Wrecked 1770
- Leontii Muchenik 64 ("Леонтий Мученик", ex-Turkish ?, captured near Ochakov (1788) during Russo-Turkish War (1787–1792)) – BU after 1791
- Prints Gustav 70/74 ("Принц Густав", ex-Swedish HMS Prins Gustav 1758, captured in Battle of Hogland 1788) – Wrecked by Norwegian coast 1798
- HMS Kronprins Gustav Adolf 62 (ex-Swedish 1782, captured near Sveaborg 1788) – Non commissioned and burnt by Russians 1788
- Prints Karl 66 ("Принц Карл", ex-Swedish HMS Prins Carl 1758, captured in Battle of Reval 1790) – BU after 1813
- Emgeiten 62/66 ("Эмгейтен", ex-Swedish HMS Ömheten 1783, captured in Battle of Vyborg Bay (1790)) – BU 1816
- Retvizan 64/66 ("Ретвизан", ex-Swedish HMS Rättvisan 1783, captured in Battle of Vyborg Bay 1790) – Interned by Britain 1808, released 1813 and sold to Britain
- Sofiya-Magdalina 74 ("София-Магдалина", ex-Swedish HMS Sofia Magdalena 1774, captured in Battle of Vyborg Bay 1790) – BU after 1805
- Finland 60 ("Финланд", ex-Swedish HMS Finland 1735, captured in Battle of Vyborg Bay 1790) – Non commissioned and BU after 1794
- Uppland 54 ("Уппланд", ex-Swedish HMS Uppland 1750, captured in Battle of Vyborg Bay 1790) – Non commissioned and sculpted 1790
- Ioann Predtecha 78/66 ("Иоанн Предтеча", ex-Turkish Melek-i Bahri, captured in Battle of Tendra 1790) – Converted to floating battery in Sevastopol 1800
- Leander 50 (ex-British Leander 1780, ex-Frehch 1798, captured during Corfu assault (1799) by Admiral Fyodor Ushakov's Russo-Turkish Squadron) – Returned to Britain 1800, hospital ship 1813, sold for BU 1817
- Bechermer 44 (ex-Dutch, captured by British-Russian Squadron near Texel Island (1799) during the War of the Second Coalition) – Delivered to Britain 1799
- Washington 70 (ex-Dutch, captured by British-Russian Squadron near Texel Island (1799) during the War of the Second Coalition) – Delivered to Britain 1799
- Sedel‘ Bakhr 84 ("Седель Бахр", ex-Turkish Sadd al-Bahr, captured in Battle of Athos 1807) – Sold to France in Trieste 1809

== Purchased foreign-built battleships (for the Baltic Fleet) ==
These were purchased around 1711–21. Name in brackets indicates place or country of purchase. It is difficult to trace some origins.

- Sviatoi Antonii 50 ("Святой Антоний", Hamburg, ex-Don Antonio di Padua) – Purchased 1711, wrecked 1716
- Randol‘f 50 ("Рандольф", England, ex-British Randolph) – Purchased 1712, BU 1725
- Bulinbruk 52 ("Булинбрук", c. 1702, England, ex-British Sussex) – Captured by Sweden 1714 and returned to Britain
- Oksford 50 ("Оксфорд", c. 1699, England, ex-Tankerfield) – Purchased 1712, sold in England 1717
- Viktoriya 50 ("Виктория", c. 1706, England, ex-French Grand Vainqueur, (ex-French Gaillard)? ex-Dutch Overwinnaer, captured 1708) – Purchased 1712, BU after 1739
- Straford 50 ("Страфорд", c. 1700, England, ex-Wintworth) – Purchased 1712, BU 1732
- Fortuna 50 ("Фортуна", ex-British Fortune) – Purchased 1713, wrecked 1716
- Armont 50 ("Армонт", ex-British) – Purchased 1713, BU 1747
- Arondel‘ 50 ("Арондель", ex-British Arundel) – Purchased 1713, BU 1747
- Perl 50 ("Перл", c. 1706/13, ex-Dutch Groote Perel) – Purchased 1713, BU after 1734
- Leferm 70 ("Леферм", ex-British, purchased 1713, ex-French le Ferme, captured 1702) – Purchased 1713, BU 1737
- London 54 ("Лондон", ex-British) – Purchased 1714, wrecked 1719
- Britaniya 50 ("Британия", ex-British Great Allen) – Purchased 1714, converted to praam 1728
- Portsmut 54 ("Портсмут". 1714, Dutch-built for Russia) – Purchased 1714, flagship of captain Naum Senyavin at the Battle of Osel Island (1719), wrecked 1719
- Devonshir 52 ("Девоншир", 1714, Dutch-built for Russia) – Purchased 1714, BU after 1737
- Marl‘burg 60 ("Марльбург", 1714, Dutch-built for Russia) – Purchased 1714, BU 1747
- Prints Evgenii 50 ("Принц Евгений", 1721, Dutch-built for Russia) – Purchased 1721, BU after 1739
- Nishtadt 56 ("Ништадт", 1721, Dutch-built for Russia, ex-Rotterdam) – Purchased 1721, wrecked 1721
- anonymous 56 (c. 1710, ex-French Beau Parterre, ex-Dutch Schonauwen, captured 1711) – Captured by Sweden and renamed Kronskepp (never commissioned to the Russian Navy, known only by foreign sources)
- Syurireis (=Surrey?) – Sold to Spain 1714 (as Real Macy 60)? (never commissioned to the Russian Navy, known only by foreign unreliable sources)
