= Vasily Chichagov =

Russian admiral (1726–1809)

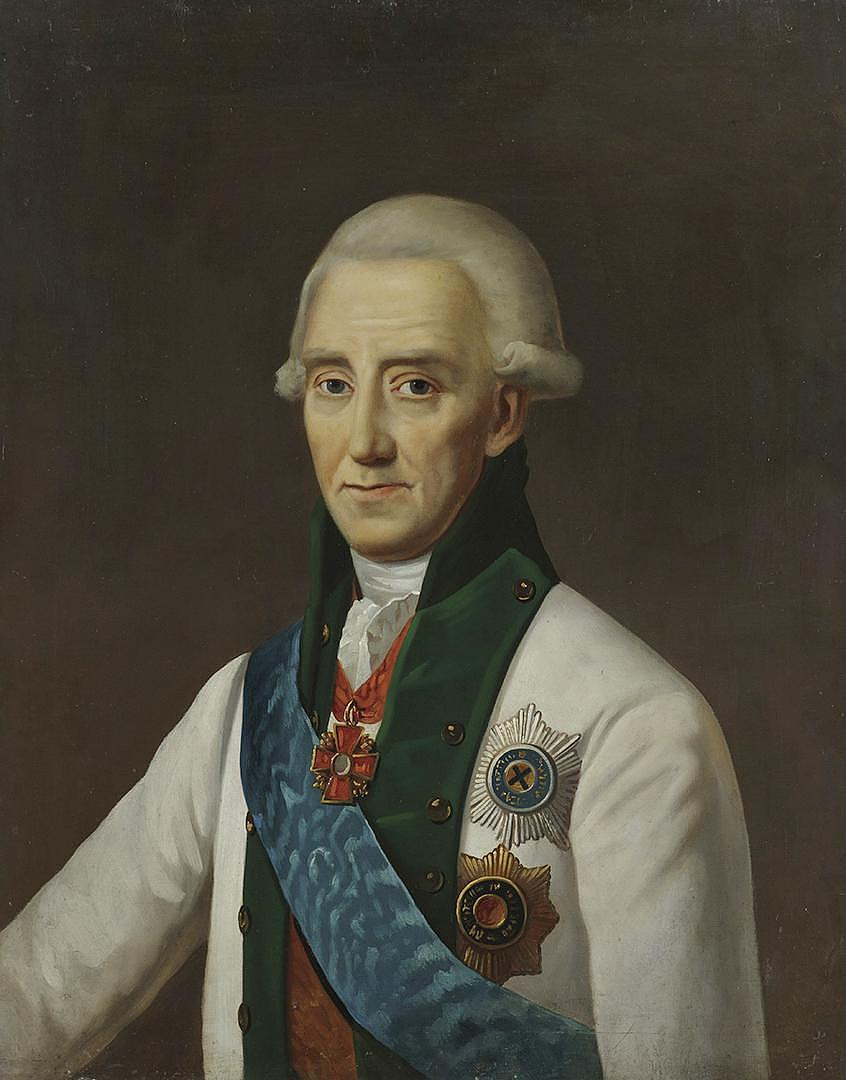
- Portrait of Chichagov
- Born: March 11, 1726
- Died: April 16, 1809 (aged 83)
- Occupations: Geographical exploration; Naval warfare
- Honours: See § Honours
- Military career
- Branch: Imperial Russian Navy
- Conflicts: Russo-Swedish War (1788–1790); • Battle of Öland; • Battle of Reval; • Battle of Vyborg

Vasily Yakovlevich Chichagov (Russian: Василий Яковлевич Чичагов, romanized: Vasiliy Yakovlevič Čičagov; (Note: Pre-1918 orthography: Василій Яковлевичъ Чичаговъ) 11 March [O.S. 28 February] 1726 – 16 April [O.S. 4 April] 1809) was an admiral in the Russian Navy who distinguished himself in the Russian–Swedish War by fighting three major battles, and an explorer who researched Svalbard.

He was the father of Pavel Chichagov, a Russian admiral during the Napoleonic Wars.

== Background ==
Joining the Navy at the age of 16, Chichagov was educated in Great Britain. Throughout his life, he would become enthusiastic for all things British, eventually marry an English woman, and spend his last years in the United Kingdom (after he had settled into retirement in 1797).

== Expeditions ==
In 1764, the scientist Lomonosov organized an expedition to find the Northeast Passage between the Atlantic and Pacific oceans by sailing along the northern coast of Siberia. Chichagov, then serving as the deputy commandant of Arkhangelsk Port, was put in charge of the expedition with three ships, the Chichagov, the Panov and the Babayev. Although he sailed past Svalbard and reached 80°26'N in 1765 and 80°30'N in 1766, both expeditions failed to find the route. However, at that time it was the maximum progress of ships to the north; the expedition participants also carried out a large volume of geophysical, oceanographic and meteorological observations, describing the animal and plant life of Svalbard.

Islands of Novaya Zemlya Archipelago, the Chichagof Island in the Alexander Archipelago in southeastern Alaska, the bay and cape of Nuka Hiva, in the Marquesas Islands of French Polynesia, the inlet Chichagof Harbor on the island of Attu in the Aleutian Islands, and a mountain at Svalbard are named after Chichagov.

== Military career ==
During the first Russo-Turkish War of Catherine's reign, Chichagov was made responsible for the defense of the Kerch Strait, preventing the Ottoman warships from gaining access to the Sea of Azov. When the war over, he administered the ports of Arkhangelsk, Revel, and Kronstadt. During the Russo-Swedish War (1788–1790), he was the commander-in-chief of the Baltic Fleet. He won over and/or steadfastly fought against Sweden in the Battle of Öland (1789), the Battle of Reval (1790) and the Battle of Vyborg Bay. Victory in the battle of Reval proved his high ability in naval affairs, though indecision prevented him from achieving strategic success at the battle of Vyborg the same year and thus ending the war in Russia's favor. Such a resounding success at Reval, despite the huge Swedish superiority in ships of the line, was to a great extent due to the Russian superiority in ship equipment (see Reval order of battle).

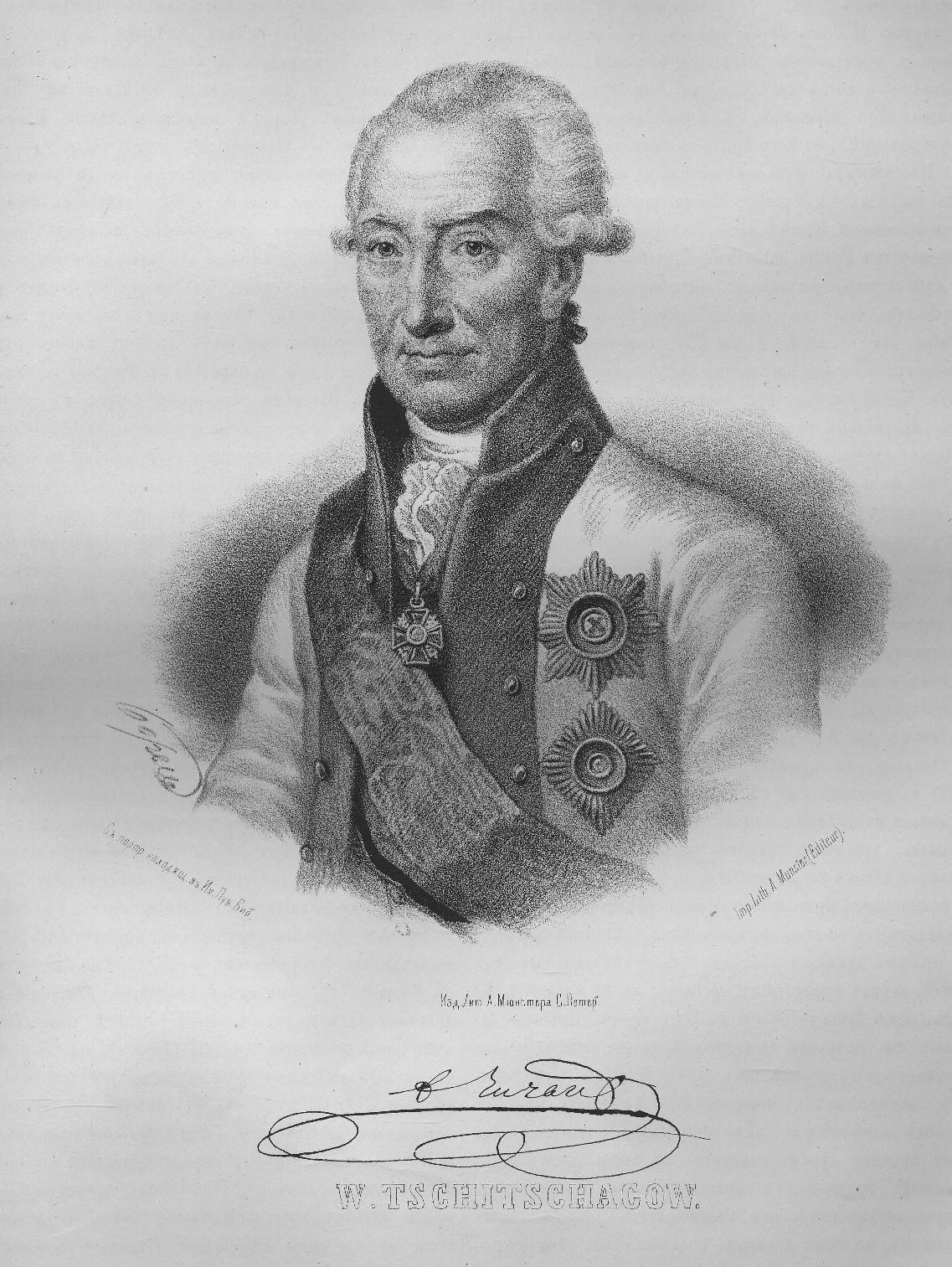
V. Ya. Chichagov lithograph by A. E. Munster

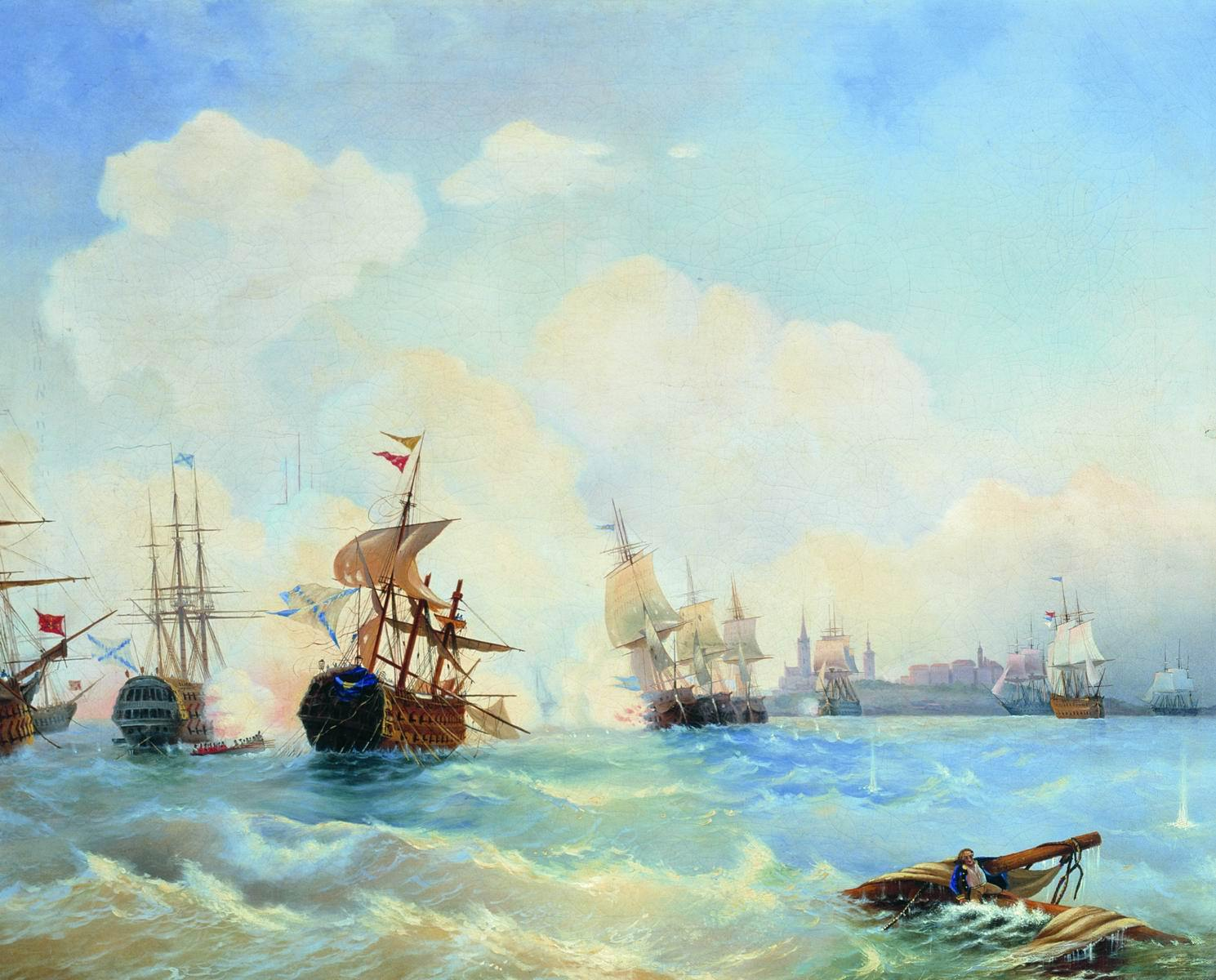
The Battle of Reval by Alexey Bogolyubov after Ivan Aivazovsky's painting

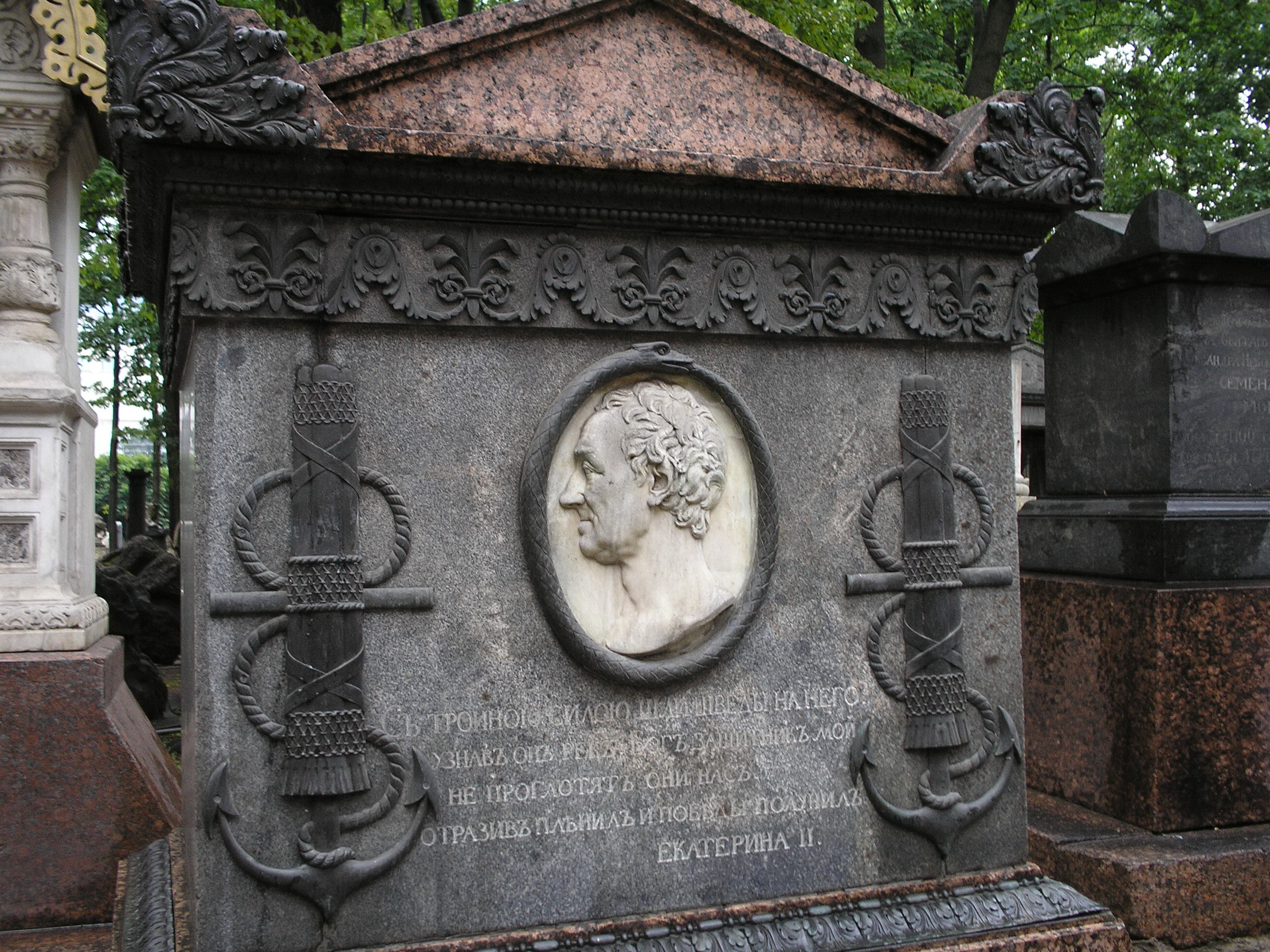
Tomb of V. Y. Chichagov.
Lazarevskoe Cemetery

== Honours ==
- • Order of Saint Anna (Oct. 1772);
- • Order of Saint George IV class (26 Nov. 1773) – "for 18 campaigns";
- • Order of Saint Alexander Nevsky (24 Nov. 1782);
- • Order of Saint Andrew the First-Called (1790) – "for victory in the Battle of Revel (Reval)";
- • Order of Saint George I class (26 Jul. 1790) – "for victory in the Battle of Vyborg (Vyborg Bay)".

== Notes, references and sources ==
=== Sources ===
- A. Sokolov. Lomonosov's Project and Chichagov's Expedition. SPb, 1854.
- Velichko, Konstantin I.; Novitsky, Vasily F.; Schwarz, Aleksey V. von; Apushkin, Vladimir A.; Schoultz, Gustav K. von (1912). Военная энциклопедия Сытина [Sytin Military Encyclopedia] (in Russian). Vol. VII: Воинская честь — Гимнастика военная. Moscow: Типография Т-ва И. Д. Сытина. pp. 99–101.
