= Battle of Vyborg Bay (1790) =

1790 battle of the Russo-Swedish War of 1788–1790

Coordinates: 60°35′N 28°31′E

- Part of the Russo-Swedish War of 1788–1790
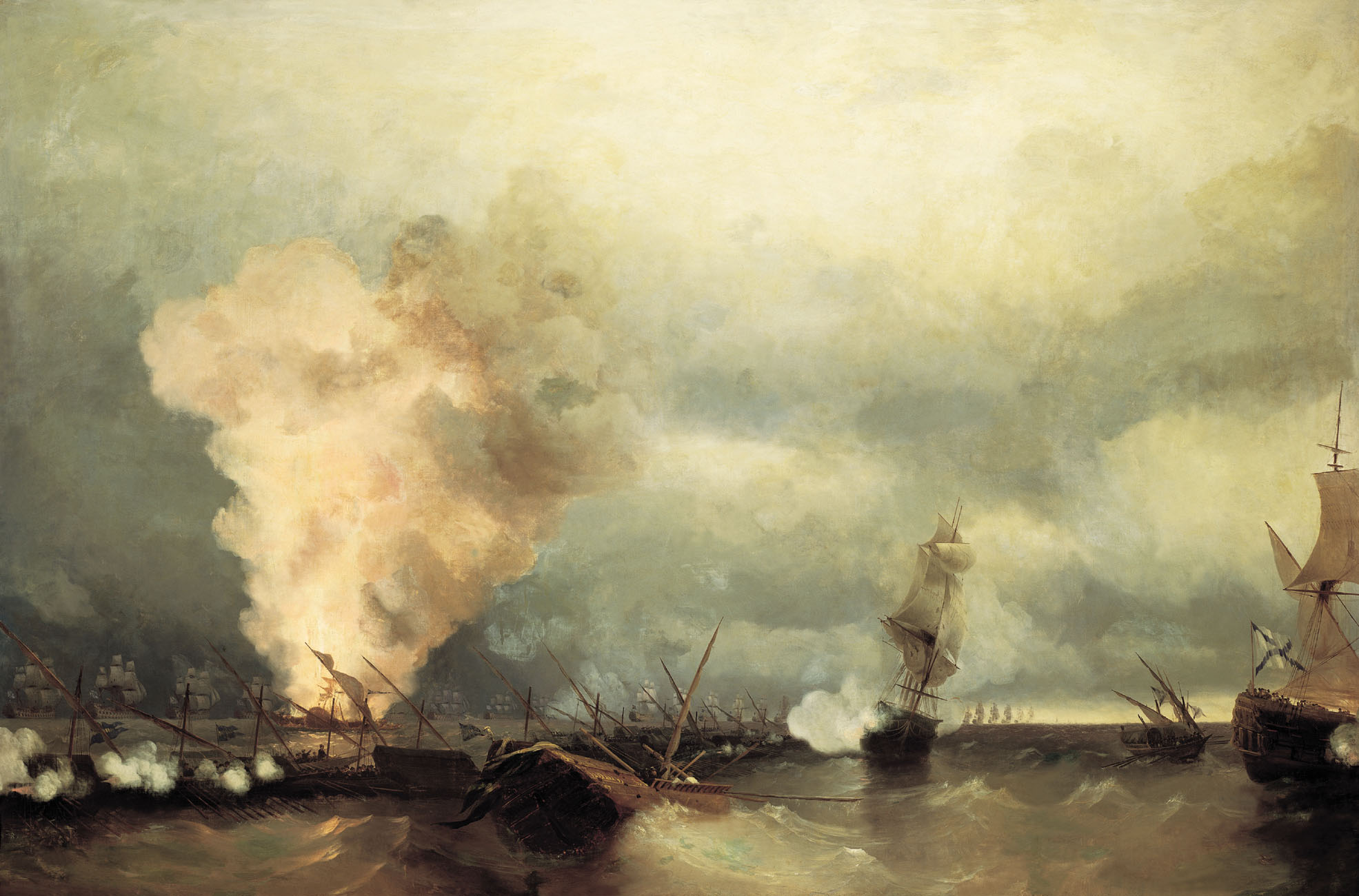
- The Battle of Vyborg Bay in 1790; Ivan Aivazovsky, 1846
Date	3 July (O.S.: 22 June) 1790
Location	Off Vyborg, Vyborg Bay
Result	See Aftermath

Belligerents
Russia	Sweden

Commanders and leaders
Vasily Chichagov; Pyotr Khanykov; Illarion Povalishin	Gustav III; Prince Charles, Duke of Södermanland; Rudolf Cederström

Strength
30 ships of the line (Note: 24 ships of the line remained unused during the battle.); 12 frigates (Note: 8 heavy frigates near Vyborg. Timofey Gavrilovich Kozlyaninov's eight light frigates failed to arrive in time. In total, Chichagov had 12 frigates in Vyborg Bay excluding Kozlyaninov.); 72 rowing craft 2,718+ cannons 21,000+ men (Note: The number of cannon and men does not include rowing craft.); Coastal artillery (Note: See Ivan Fersen)	20 ships of the line (Note: Estimates: • 20; • 22); 12 frigates (Note: Estimates: • 10; • 12): 242–350 arch. vessels (Note: 242–350 archipelago vessels, ~200 of which were used in combat.); 13,000–22,000 men (landing party) (Note: Estimates: • 13,000; • 22,000); 200 in battle; 13,000–14,000 men (landing party) (Note: Estimates: • 13,000; • 14,000); 3,000 naval cannons 30,000–40,000 seamen and soldiers including arch. landing party (Note: 30,000–40,000 on board including the ~22,000-strong landing party from archipelago vessels, but only 14,000 of them fought in the battle.)

Casualties and losses
One estimate: not a single vessel lost; 117 killed; 164 wounded Another estimate: 6 ships of the line out of action; 1,000 men	One estimate: 5 ships of the line; 3 frigates; 6 galleys; 14 gunboats; c. 30 transports; 5,000 men; 2 additional ships of the line lost after the battle Other estimates: 7–9 ships of the line; 3 frigates; 54 smaller vessels; 7,000–8,000 men

The Battle of Vyborg Bay (also known as the Battle of Vyborg) (Note: Russian: Выборгское морское сражение; in Swedish literature known as Viborgska gatloppet, "the Viborg gauntlet".) was fought between Russia and Sweden on 3 July 1790 in Vyborg Bay off the coast of Vyborg during the Russo-Swedish War of 1788–1790. The Swedish Navy suffered heavy losses, losing several ships of the line and frigates, but under Gustav III eventually managed to escape through a Russian naval blockade composed of units of the Baltic Fleet, commanded by Admiral Vasily Chichagov. British historians would later call the Battle of Vyborg Bay the "Baltic Trafalgar". The battle ranks among the world's largest historical naval battles and also among the most influential, as it introduced the naval battle concept of "firepower over mobility".

== Background ==
In 1790, King Gustav III revived his plan for a landing close to St. Petersburg, this time near Viborg. But the plan foundered in a disastrous attack on the Russian fleet at the Battle of Reval on 13 May. A further attack on the Russian fleet off Kronstadt at the beginning of June also failed and the Swedish high seas fleet and the "archipelago fleet" (skärgårdsflottan) both retired to Vyborg Bay.

The stage for the battle was set in the first week of June. Northern white nights were nearly as light as the day and, to King Gustav's consternation, unfavourable southwesterly winds prevented the combined Swedish fleets of some 400 vessels from sailing southeast to Swedish-controlled Finnish waters. This allowed the Russian sailing battlefleet and coastal galley fleet to join forces.

King Gustav ordered a two-part Swedish naval force of 400 ships (with 3,000 guns and 30,000 sailor and soldiers) to anchor temporarily between the islands of Krysserort (Ristiniemi in Finnish), and Biskopsö (Severny Berezovy in Russian, Piisaari in Finnish) just inside the mouth of Viborg Bay, Russia, in the Gulf of Finland. This strategic position placed the Swedish navy within striking distance of the Russian imperial capital, Saint Petersburg.

The sailing battlefleet of 21 ships of the line, 13 frigates, various smaller ships, and 16,000 men, was led by flag-captain Admiral Otto Henrik Nordenskiöld, under command of Grand Admiral Duke Carl, younger brother of King Gustav III. The coastal galley flotilla (Skärgårdsflottan) of 14,000 sailors and army soldiers was led by flag-captain Colonel George de Frese, under personal charge of Gustav III.

On 8 June, the Russian Baltic Fleet under Admiral Vasily Chichagov blockaded the only two navigable channels in and out of Viborg Bay and locked the Swedish fleet in the bay while he waited for Prince Charles Henry of Nassau-Siegen to arrive from Kronstadt with the Russian galley fleet. This blockade consisted of a primary force of 50 ships (with 2,718 guns and 21,000 men), and a secondary force of 20 galleys (led by Captain Slizov), 8 rowed archipelago frigates (led by Vice-Admiral Kozlyaninov) and 52 other rowed galleys.

On Chichagov's orders, four sets of ships (each with a trailing bomb ship) were positioned east to west, broadsides to the Swedish force. The first set, led by Major General Pyotr Lezhnev, consisted of four ships of the line in the narrow eastern channel. In the dangerously shallow western channel between Krysserort and Repiegrund sat a set of five chain-linked ships of the line; a group of five frigates (three led by Rear Admiral Pyotr Khanykov and two led by British-born Russian admiral Robert Crown) further south between Lilla Fiskarna island, the Pensar Islets (Pensarholmarna) and the shoreline, and another group of five ships (including two frigates) further west at Pitkäpaasi.

Meanwhile, on 18 June, an assault on the Russian galley fleet at Trångsund (Vysotsk, Uuras in Finnish), ordered by Gustav III and started two days earlier, failed due to lack of support of its center force and returned. Shortages of food and water prompted Gustav III to act. On 19 June, he instructed admiral Nordenskiöld to formulate a plan for the breakout for when the winds changed, one which would include a distraction with gun sloops with an actual breakout at Krysserort, and one which the king would lead personally.

Then on 2 July, the wind shifted to the north, favorably for the Swedish supreme command at Vyborg Bay, which met in session, and a Swedish reconnaissance force apprehended a Russian unit in the Battle of Björkösund.

== Battle ==
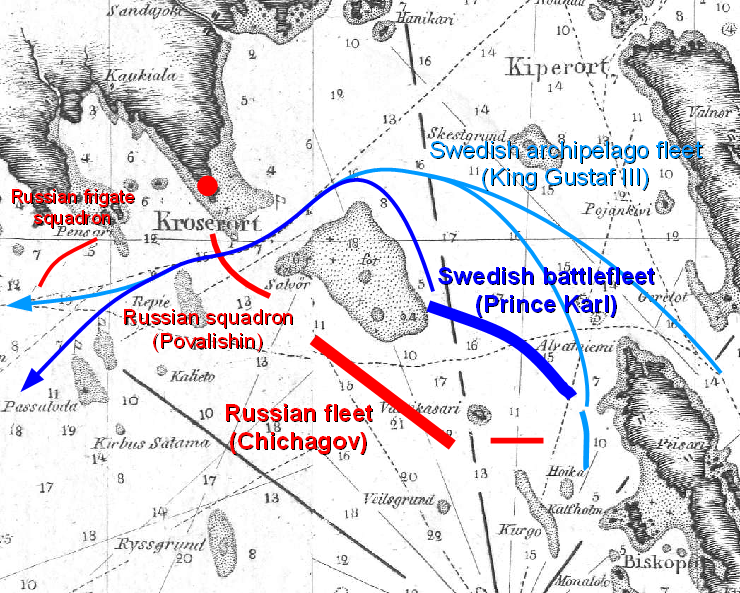
Battle of Vyborg Bay (1790)

On 21 June, Prince Nassau-Siegen attacked the Swedes at Björkö Sound with 89 ships. Then, at nightfall on 3 July (22 June OS), Gustav III ordered the breakout to commence from Krysserort at 10:00 on the following day.

At 02:00 on 4 July, Swedish units bombarded Russian shore batteries. At the same time, Swedish sloops, led by Lieutenant Colonel Jacob Törning, attacked a Russian naval unit just west of Vasikansaari Island, west of Björkö sound.

Just prior to 07:00 that morning, Gustav III spoke with then captain Johan Puke of the 64-gun ship of the line, the Dristigheten ("The Audacity"), which would lead the breakout. Moments later, Puke, aboard the Dristigheten, led a line of ships and the Swedish naval fleet away from the bay, through the western channel, around the Salvors shallows into the middle of the channel between the shallows and Krysserort, and towards the first Russian ships of the line, the Seslav and Saint Peter which were part of the Russian Admiral Povalishin's squadron deployed to block the channel leading to west.

This line of ships consisted of the flagship the Konung Gustaf III (with Prince Grand Admiral Duke Carl aboard), the Seraphimerorden (with Gustav III aboard) - in the line's center, the Manligheten ("The Manliness", sister ship of the Dristigheten), the other ships of line, the navy frigates, the frigate Zemire, the 70-gun ship of the line Enigheten ("The Unity"), and three fire barges, used to set fire to enemy ships. Meanwhile, the flotilla protected the naval fleet, on a parallel course further west, nearer the shoreline. Immediately prior to the engagement, Gustav III transferred onto a smaller sloop. Puke ordered all non-essential personnel below decks and, moments later, the Swedish navy engaged the Russian blockade, splitting between the Selsav and the Saint Peter. Gustav III was rowed through the fire, but the flagship Konung Gustaf III was hit and the Grand Admiral Duke Carl injured.

While the blockading Russian ships opened fire on the Swedish vanguard, the damage caused by the Russian ships was relatively small and the large vanguard ships remained fully capable of action. Swedish fire when sailing past the blockading Russian ships however caused damage to several of the Russian ships. By the time the main body of the Swedish fleets arrived to the blockade, the Russian ships posed no longer any danger to the Swedes. At least one of the Russian vessels had substantial damage during the battle. Russian frigate squadron west of the Povalishin's ships was too far out with their visibility obscured by gunpowder smoke to prevent the Swedish ships from breaching the blockade. Near total inactivity of the main body of the Russian fleet of Admiral Chichagov aided the Swedes.

Once through the first group of ships, Gustav III reboarded the Seraphimerorden. The king's personal ship, the Amphion survived with no damage. Further west, the galley fleet line of ships consisting sequentially of the frigates Styrbjörn and Norden ("North"), six Turuma squadron ships, Sällan Värre ("Rarely Worse"), the remaining archipelago frigates, Malmberg's and Hjelmstierna's coastal squadrons, and Colonel Jacob Tönningen's assigned gun sloops and gun tenders, passed the first Russian set of ships, then engaged the second. The Styrbjörn was subjected to heavy fire, but managed to pass through and score some hits on Russian commander Povalishin's ship and on the bomb ship Pobeditel ("Victor").

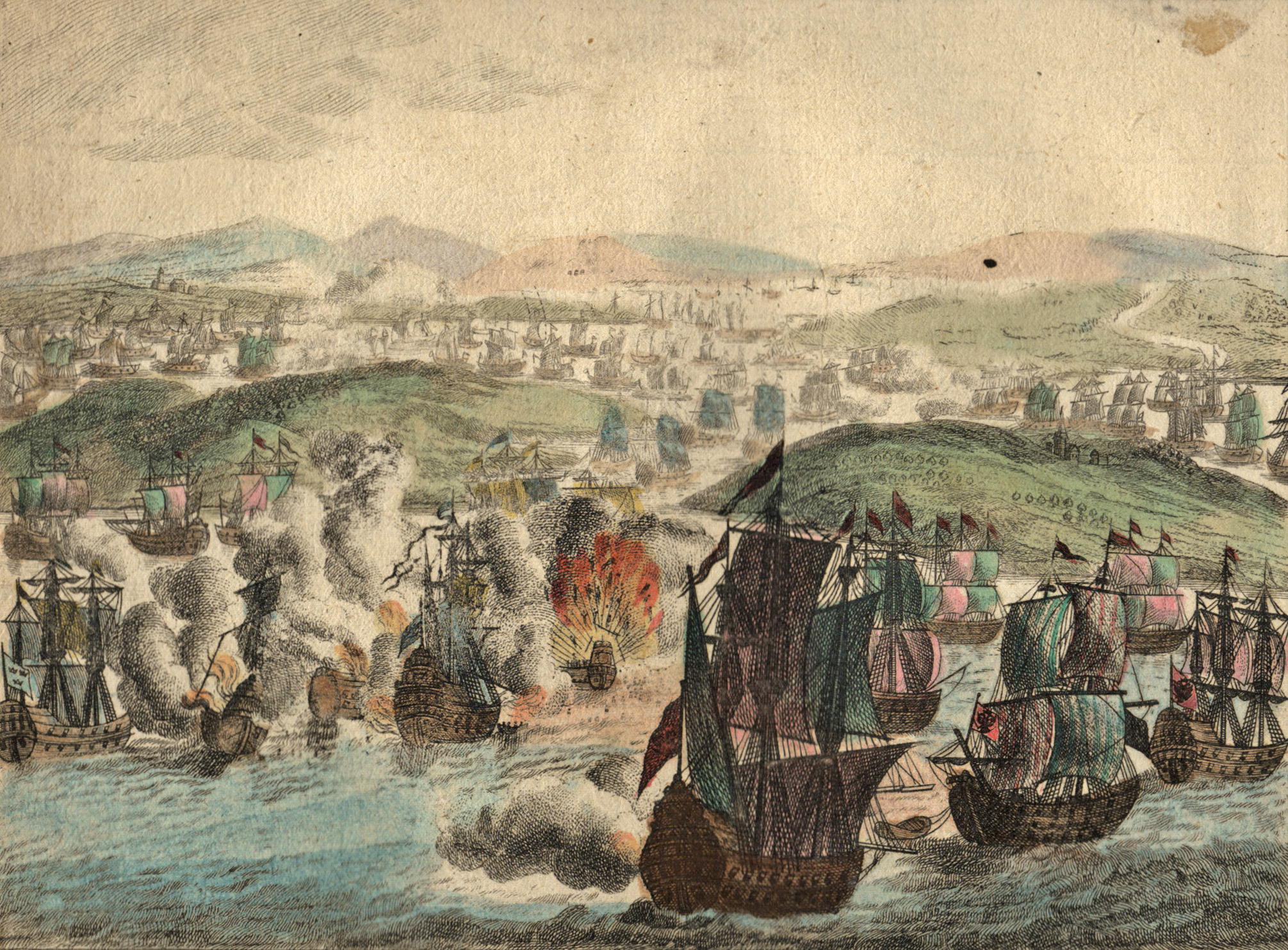
Battle of Vyborg Bay, as depicted in Nordischer Kriegsschauplaz

As the majority of both Swedish fleets passed through the blockade, Ensign Sandel, commanding the fireship Postiljonen ("Postman"), towed by the 74-gun ship of the line Enigheten, set his ship on fire too early. He then, under alcoholic intoxication, committed a series of errors which caused the fireship to drift towards the Enigheten, setting it on fire, and then to collide with the Swedish 40-gun frigate Zemire, with all three ships exploding in an enormous channel-covering cascade of debris and smoke. The explosion severely damaged or destroyed ships within or trying to get through the blockade. The Russian ship groups blocking the Swedish fleets were disrupted by passing Swedish ships. Rättvisan and Sofia Magdalina were captured.

The Swedish navy lost a total of eight ships (seven running aground in the heavy smoke from the explosion): four grounded ships of the line - the 64-gun Hedvig Elisabeth Charlotta (though her captain, Henrik Johan Nauckhoff, continued firing at the Russian frigates until the end), the Finland at the Salvors shallows, the 74-gun Lovisa Ulrika at the Passaloda shallows just south of Reipie, and the 64-gun Ömheten (the Tenderness) at the Pensar islets - and one shipwrecked ship of the line (the Auroras), although the king's British naval adviser Sidney Smith was saved; three frigates including the Uppland and the Jarrislawitz (Yaroslavets, captured in 1788 from Russia), both at the Passaloda shallows. The Swedes had lost 5,000, or up to 7,000–8,000 men killed, captured and wounded; of these, 2,000, 3,000 or 7,000 were killed or wounded, and about 5,000 captured. The Russians lost only 117 killed and 164 wounded, not a single ship was lost to enemy fire, or up to 1,000 men with six ships of the line out of action.

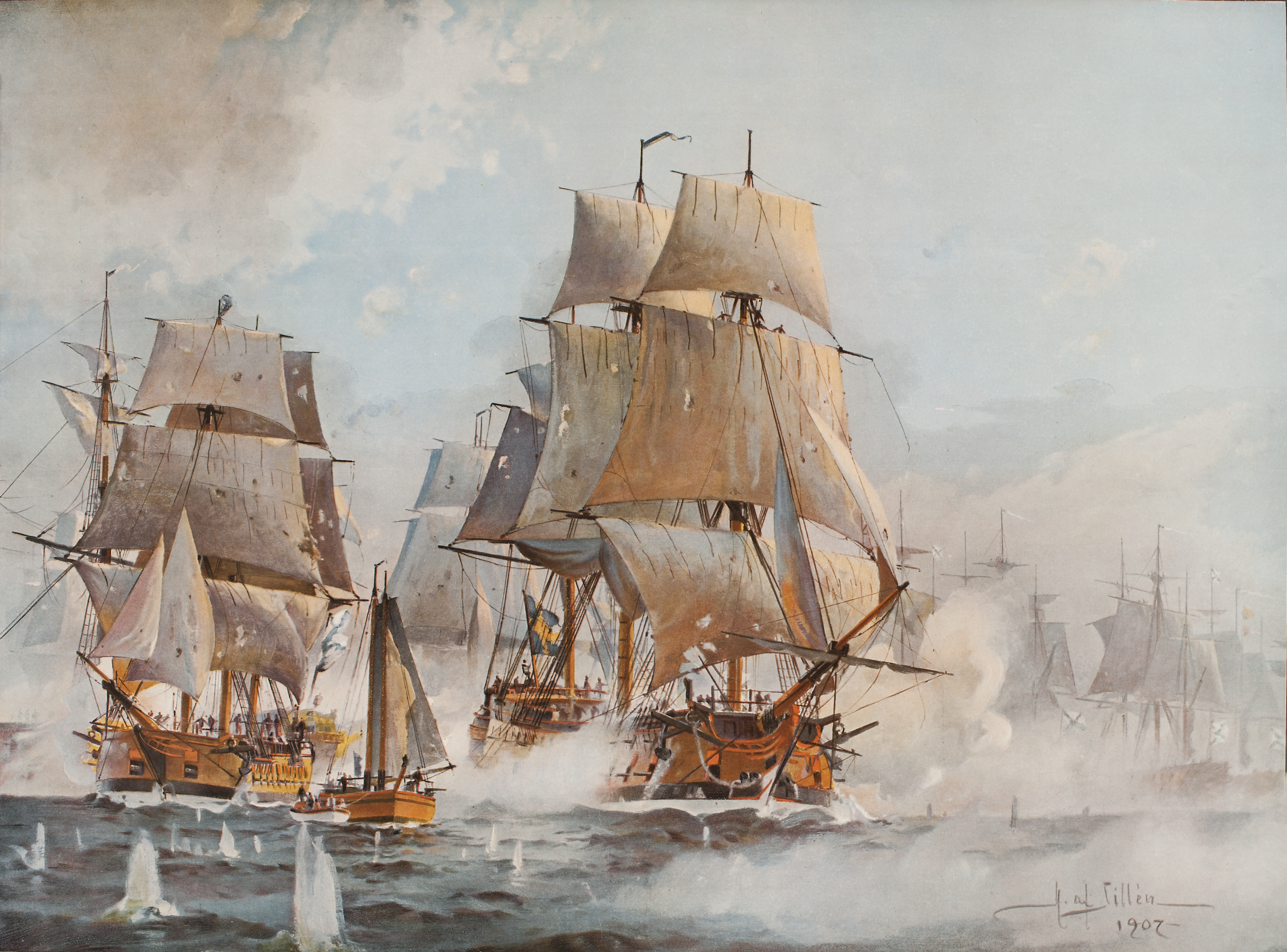
Depiction of the battle by Herman af Sillén (1907)

The two Swedish fleets followed separate routes from the bay. The battlefleet accompanied by most of the heavier elements of the archipelago fleet (such as the archipelago frigates) sailed to the open sea while the rest of the archipelago fleet followed the much shallower route closer to the land. However, the Russian frigate squadron commanded by Crown was deployed expressly to blockade the shallower route which forced the light Swedish gun sloops, gun yawls and galleys to head to more open waters where the waves and winds rendered the Swedish archipelago fleet almost totally incapable of fighting. Noticing that the Swedes sailed further out and the problems that it had caused, Crown set after them and forced several of the Swedish ships to strike their colors as he threatened to run over the small Swedish ships struggling in the open sea. Crown's squadron very nearly captured Gustaf III but were turned away almost on the last seconds by the orders from Chichagov to start pursuit of the Swedish battlefleet just as Crown's frigate was about to capture the ship where Gustaf III was. As the Russians had only sent few prize crews in their hurry to force Swedish ships to surrender, most of the Swedish ships which had surrendered raised their flags again or overpowered the prize crews and rejoined the Swedish archipelago fleet once the frigate squadron had been ordered to leave.

The Swedish archipelago fleet lost four galleys to the shallows: the Ehrenpreuss, the Palmstierna, the Nerika. These ships were all run aground at the Pensar islet, close to the second set of Russian ships and the Russian ship Noli Me Tangere (Не тронь меня), only Nerika was able get escape while others were forced to struck their colors. Additionally galleys Östergötland, Nordstjerneorden, Ekeblad and Dalarne were captured by the Russians while the Swedish were trying to avoid Russian frigate squadron blocking the coastal sea route.

== Aftermath ==
The Swedish navy and archipelago fleets managed to escape the Russian blockade, albeit with heavy losses. Russian sources generally claim a victory, but some Russian sources claim that the Russians failed to achieve victory, and other sources claim the Swedes strategic victory.

The Swedish warships that survived the breakout headed into open seas, assembled at Vidskär, a skerry just south of Pitkäpaasi, and then sailed to Sveaborg fortress near Helsinki, now Finland, for repairs. Chichagov was late in pursuing the Swedish navy, but pursued them to Sveaborg. The next day, Captain Crown captured the 62-gun Retvisan ("Justice" in old Swedish spelling) with the help of the 66-gun Izyaslav (The Imperial Russian Navy would subsequently name other ships "Retvisan").

The Swedish battlefleet retired to Sveaborg for repairs while the Swedish archipelago fleet made for a strong defensive position at Svensksund, near Kotka. An impetuous Russian attack on the Swedish archipelago fleet on 9 July at the Second Battle of Svensksund resulted in a disaster for the Russians. The losses suffered by the sides in two major naval battles led to the conclusion of a Värälä peace treaty.

== Sources ==
- Егоршина, Петрова (2023). История русской армии [The history of the Russian Army] (in Russian). Moscow: Moskva. ISBN 978-5-699-42397-2.
- Ordin, Kesar (1889). Покорение Финляндии [The Conquest of Finland] (in Russian). Vol. 1. Saint-Petersburg: Типография Скороходова.
- Anderson, R. C. (1969). Naval Wars in the Baltic, 1522-1850. London: Francis Edwards Limited.
- Derry, T. K. (1965). Scandinavia. The New Cambridge Modern History. Vol. IX. Cambridge: Cambridge University Press.
- (in Finnish) Johnsson, Raoul (2011). Grönroos, Maria; Karttunen, Ilkka (eds.). Kustaa III ja suuri merisota [Gustaf III and the Great Naval War] (in Finnish). Helsinki: John Nurminen Foundation. ISBN 978-952-9745-31-9.
- Jägerskiöld, Stig (1990). Ruotsinsalmi (in Finnish). Keuruu: Otava. ISBN 951-1-09586-2.
- Lambert, Andrew D. (1956). War at Sea in the Age of the Sail 1650-1850. Cassell. ISBN 0-304-35246-2.
- Mattila, Tapani (1983). Meri maamme turvana [Sea protecting our country] (in Finnish). Jyväskylä: K. J. Gummerus Osakeyhtiö. ISBN 951-99487-0-8.
- Mitchell, Donald W. (1974). A History of Russian and Soviet Sea Power. New York: Maxmillan.
- Per Åkesson (April 2007). "The Swedish-Russian Sea Battles of 1790". Archived from the original on 31 March 2019.
- "Vyborg and Rochensalm (The History of Russian Navy)". Archived from the original on 14 April 2012.
- Novikov, Nikolay Vasilyevich (1948). Боевая летопись русского флота [Battle chronicle of the Russian navy] (in Russian). Moscow: Военное издательство министерства вооруженных сил союза ССР.
- Iko, Per; Hårdstedt, Martin (2003). "Teaterkonung i krig : Viborg 1790". Svenska slagfält (in Swedish). Stockholm: Wahlström & Widstrand. ISBN 9789146202257.
- "Выборгское морское сражение". Military Encyclopedia: In 18 Volumes. 1911–1915.
- Grant, R. G. (2010). Battle at Sea : 3000 Years of Naval Warfare. London: Dorling Kindersley Limited. ISBN 9781405353359.
- Rosén, John; Westrin, Theodor (1893). Nordisk familjebok : konversationslexikon och realencyklopedi, innehållande upplysningar och förklaringar om märkvärdiga namn, föremål och begrepp (in Swedish). Vol. 17. Stockholm: Expeditionen af Nordisk familjebok. OCLC 249354673.
