= Battle of Reval order of battle =

This is a listing of the fleets that participated in the Battle of Reval on 13 May 1790:

== Russia ==
Prints Gustav 74

=== First line ===
Kir Ioann 74
Saratov 100
Sv. Elena 74
Prochor 66
Mstislav 74
Rostislav 100
Izyaslav 66
Pobyedonosets 66
Boleslav 66
Yaroslav 74
Venus 44

=== Second line ===
Premislav 42
Nadezhda Blagopolutchia 38
Podrazhislav 38
Slava 38
Pobyeditel 18
Strashni 14

=== Third line ===
Merkurii 29
Lebed 28
Vyestnik
Volchov 8
Olen
Stchastlivyi 8
Letutchii 28
Neptun 18

== Sweden ==
Wladislaff 74
Dristigheten 64
Götha Lejon 70
Louise Ulrika 70
Uppland 44
Galathea 42
Riksens Ständer 60 – Ran aground and burnt
Euredice 42
Tapperheten 64
Konung Gustaf III 74
Gripen 44
Camilla 42
Enigheten 70
Fröja 42
Rättvisan 62
Ömheten 62
Fäderneslandet 64
Försightigheten 64
Äran 64
Hedvig Elisabeth Charlotta 64
Sophia Magdalena 74
Konung Adolf Fredrik 70
Wasa 64
Prins Fredrik Adolf 62
Prins Carl 64 – Captured

== Bibliography ==
- Tredrea, John; Sozaev, Eduard (2010). Russian Warships in the Age of Sail 1696–1860 – Design, Construction, Careers and Fates. Barnsley: Seaforth Publishing. ISBN 978-1-84832-058-1.
- Paul Jordan (1890), "Die Seeschlacht bei Reval. Den 2. Mai 1790", Baltische Monatsschrift (in German), vol. 37, no. 1–9, Reval, pp. 205–228, hdl:10062/18940
