= Battle of Reval =

1790 battle of the Russo-Swedish War of 1788–1790

- Part of the Russo-Swedish War of 1788–1790
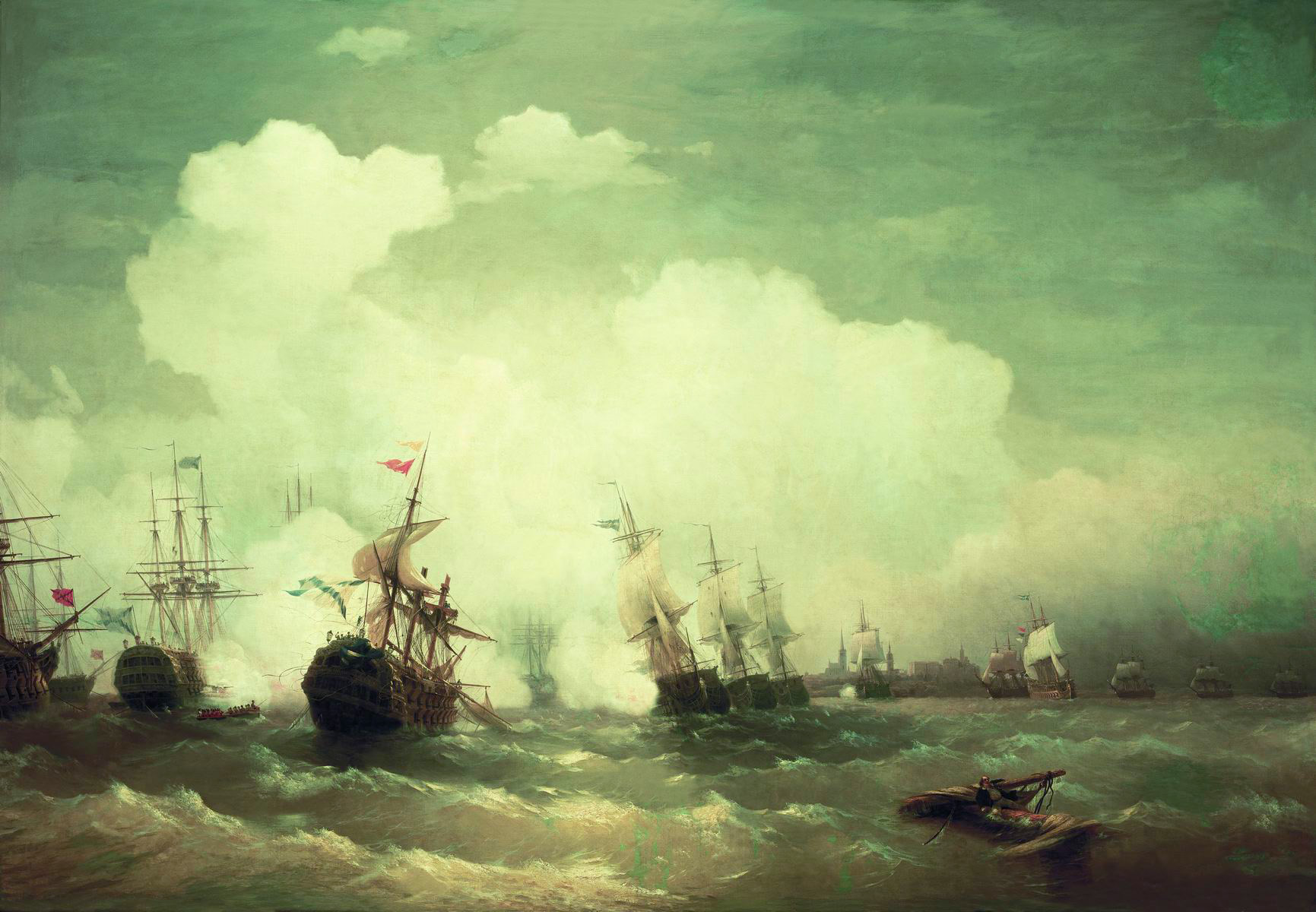
- Sea battle at Reval; Ivan Aivazovsky, 1846
Date	13 May 1790
Location	Off Reval, Revel Roadstead 59°30′N 24°45′E
Result	Russian victory

Belligerents
Russia	Sweden

Commanders and leaders
Vasily Chichagov	Prince Charles

Strength
10 ships of the line 5 frigates 2 bomb vessels 7 cutters Shore artillery (Note: This is the number of only those ships that participated in the battle; as on the side of Sweden, whose fleet attacked Chichagov's squadron at the roadstead. The entire fleet of Vasily Chichagov when joined with Timofey Kozlyaninov (22 July 1789) consisted of 30 ships of the line, 10 frigates, 2 bomb ships, 4 gunboats, 3 transports and 9 other/small ships. Based on N. V. Novikov and P. Jordan In the first line were 10 line ships and a frigate; in the second, opposite the gaps of ships, 4 frigates, having a bomb ship on each flank. In the third were 7 cutters. Based on F. F. Veselago The Swedish fleet put to sea on 30 April; on the way, news came that the Russians were anchored in the Revel Roadstead: 2 three-deckers, 6 two-deckers and 6 frigates. Based on Alfred Stenzel The Russians fought under the protection of coastal batteries, which greatly contributed to the outcome of the battle. The same assessment says that Chichagov had 10 lineships and 1 frigate, and this is only the first line as said before. Based on A. G. Brückner)	22 ships of the line 4 frigates 4 smaller ships (Note: On 30 April the Swedish fleet put to sea, with a total force of: 22 ships of the line, 12 frigates, 13 transports; there were nearly 2,100 cannons and 18,000 men; about 3,000 men were missing. Based on Alfred Stenzel Swedish fleet consisting of 22 ships of the line, 4 frigates and 4 small ships under the Duke of Södermanland's command attacked the Russian squadron standing on the Revel Roadstead. Based on N. V. Novikov, P. Jordan, and F. F. Veselago)

Casualties and losses
8 killed 27 wounded	~150–200 killed, wounded or missing (Note: According to Prince Charles's "unreliable" reports, — 150 dead and wounded. This figure also appears in Swedish historians.; >200): • 130 to 150 killed (Note: 130; 150); or: 51 dead and ~80 wounded. 1 ship of the line captured: • ~400 to 600 captured seamen and army personnel on it; (Note: almost 400 sailors, soldiers, and officers; 420 naval officers, army officers, sailors, cuirassiers, and infantrymen; 520 crew; 600 crew); • or incl. as few as 250 men captured.; 1 ship of the line destroyed 5 ships heavily damaged 40 to 42 cannons lost

The Battle of Reval (Note: Russian: Ревельское сражение, dir. 'Battle of Revel') took place on 13 May [O.S. 2 May] 1790 during the Russo-Swedish War of 1788–1790, off the port of Reval in the roadstead (now Tallinn, Estonia). This battle ended in an imposing Imperial Russian Navy victory; it has been compared to the practice of running the gauntlet.

== Origins ==
Undaunted by the Swedish defeats and failures during 1789, the Swedish king, Gustav III, sent the battle fleet under his brother Prince Charles, Duke of Södermanland, to eliminate Admiral Vasily Chichagov's Russian squadron, which had wintered in the harbor at Reval.

General-Admiral Duke Karl (Charles) of Södermanland approached Reval with 26 ships of the line and large frigates mounting a combined 1,680 cannon. Chichagov, preparing to meet the enemy in the harbour, formed a battle line made up of 9 ships of the line and the frigate Venus.

== Battle ==
The Russian fleet (10 ships of the line, 5 frigates) was anchored in a line going from Reval harbour towards the Viimsi (Wims) peninsula. The first line consisted of nine ships of the line and frigates, i.e. the 100-gun battleships Rostislav (flagship of Admiral Vasily Chichagov, captained by his son Pavel Chichagov) and Saratov (flagship of Vice Admiral Alexey Vasilyevich Musin-Pushkin, captained by Nikolai Barsh), the 74-gun ships of the line Kir Ioann, Mstislav, Sv. Elena (flagship of Counter Admiral Pyotr Khanykov, captained by Carl Magnus von Breyer) and Yaroslav, the 66-gun ships of the line Pobedonosets, Boleslav and Izyaslav and the 40-gun frigate Venus (captained by Robert Crown). In the second line, four frigates: Podrazhislav (32 guns), Slava (32), Nadezhda Blagopoluchiya (32) and Pryamislav (36). Two bomb-vessels were deployed on the flanks. The third line was composed of seven cutters. The squadron was assisted by coastal artillery.

The Swedish fleet under the command of General-Admiral Duke Karl consisted of 22 ships of the line, four frigates and four smaller vessels. It entered the harbour and started passing by the anchored Russian ships.

Due to strong winds and inaccurate aiming, most Swedish projectiles ricocheted past their targets, while the Russian ships that were anchored within the protected area of the harbour were able to use their guns much more effectively. The ship of the Swedish General-Admiral, which could not be brought into the wind due to a rigging problem, was forced to drift towards Rostislav and received major damage from grapeshot. The 64-gun battleship Prins Karl, fifteenth in the Swedish line, lost her rudder to Russian fire and had to strike her colours.

The Duke of Södermanland directed the battle from the frigate Ulla Fersen, beyond the range of Russian fire. After a two-hour artillery duel he ordered his ships to break off the engagement; hence the last ten ships of Swedish line veered off without firing a shot. The Swedish ship Riksens Ständer hit the reef north of Aegna (Wolf) island. Swedish attempts to dislodge her failed, and the Swedes were forced to burn her so that the Russians would be unable to take her.

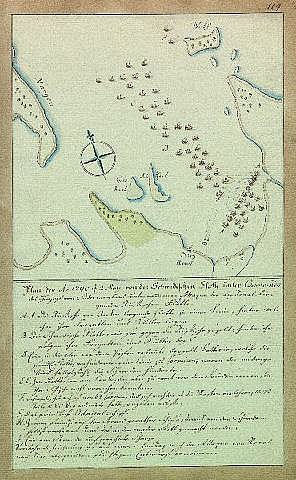
Battle plan. Drawing by Johann Christoph Brotze.

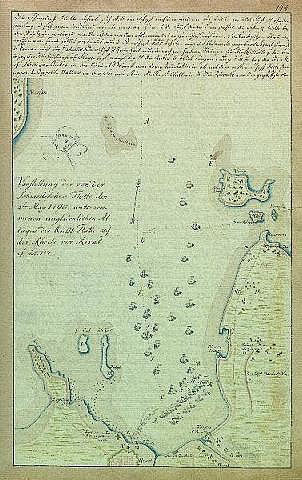
Battle plan No. 2. By Johann Christoph Brotze.

Battle of Reval, as depicted by Jacob Hägg. Maritime Museum (Stockholm).

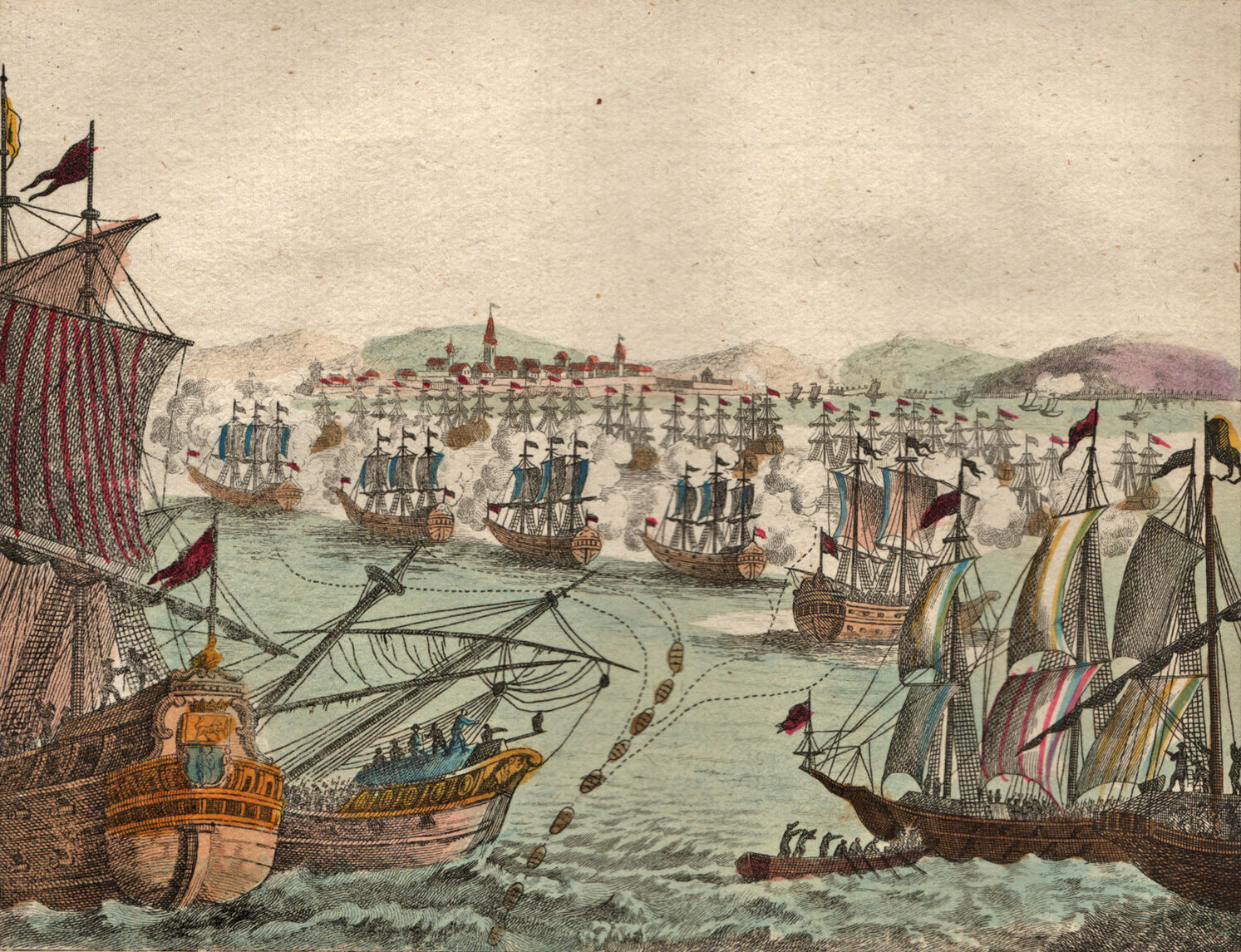
The battle, as depicted in Nordischer Kriegsschauplaz

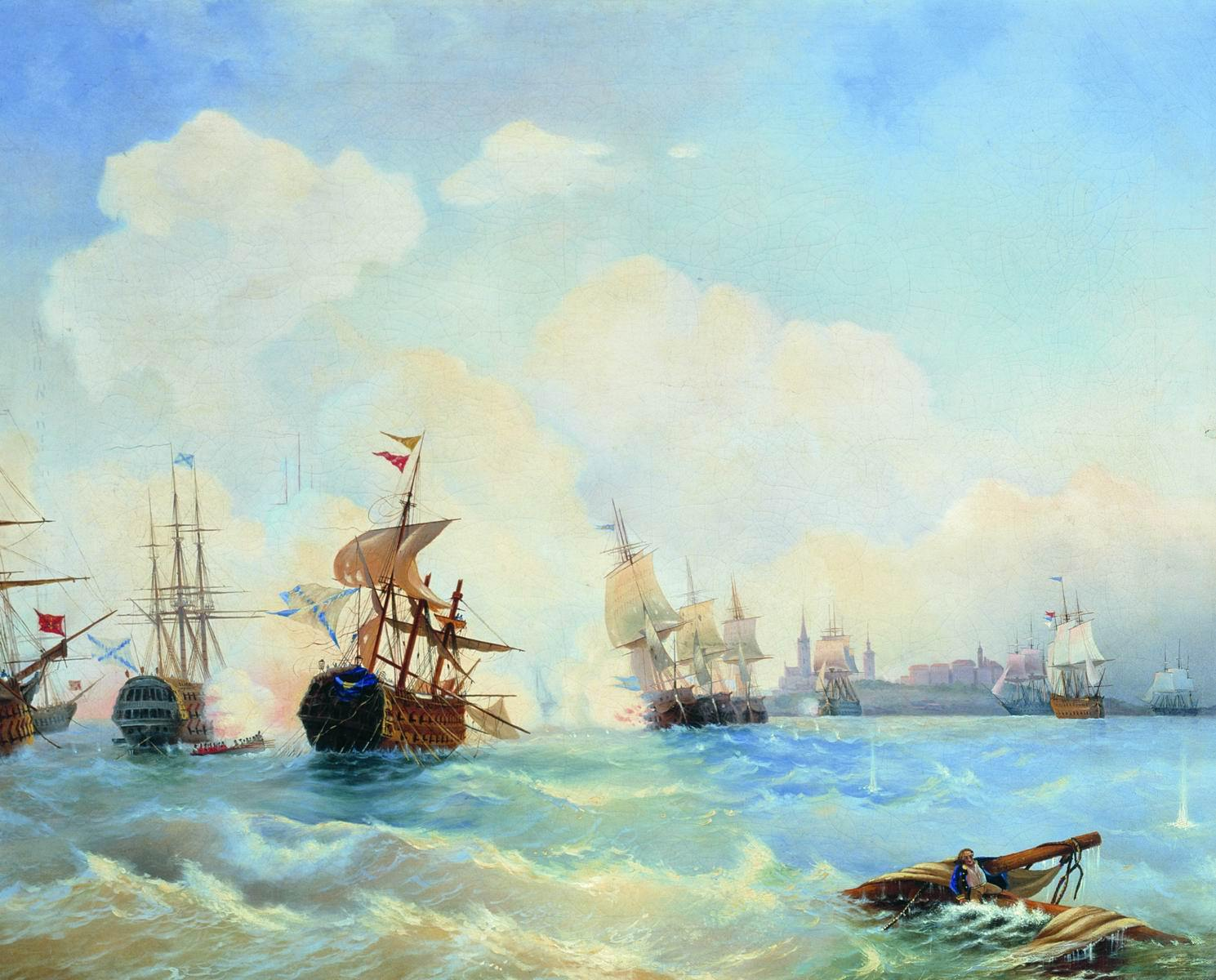
The battle, as depicted by Alexey Bogolyubov after Ivan Aivazovsky's painting

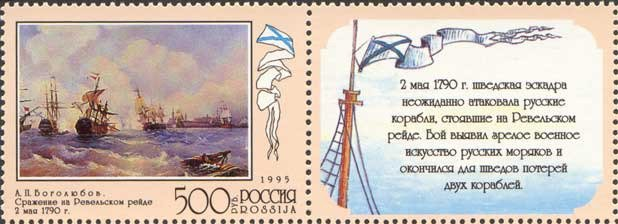
The battle on the postage stamp with Bogolyubov's painting

== Aftermath ==
The Battle of Reval was a resounding Russian victory. The Swedes lost two ships of the line, and were forced to retreat despite their more than twofold numerical superiority in line ships. Russian losses were 8 killed and 27 injured. Contemporary sources reported Russian casualties of 4 killed, 7 seriously and 18 lightly wounded, with almost 400 Swedish sailors, soldiers and officers captured and presumably 130 killed. Swedish losses vary considerably in other sources, ranging from 381 (Swedish estimate) to 800 (various combined estimates).

After the battle the Swedish fleet partially repaired at the sea, and then sailed away east of Hogland Island.

== See also ==
- Reval order of battle

== Bibliography ==
- Tredrea, John; Sozaev, Eduard (2010). Russian Warships in the Age of Sail 1696–1860 – Design, Construction, Careers and Fates. Barnsley: Seaforth Publishing. ISBN 978-1-84832-058-1.
- Novikov, Nikolay Vasilyevich (1948). Боевая летопись русского флота [Battle chronicle of the Russian navy] (in Russian). Moscow: Military publishing house of the Ministry of Armed Forces of the Union of SSRs.
- Stenzel, Alfred; Kirchhoff, Hermann (2002) [1907–1911]. "Шведско-русская война 1788–1790 гг." [Swedish-Russian war of 1788–1790]. Written at Hanover, Province of Hanover, Kingdom of Prussia, German Empire. История войн на море с древнейших времен до конца XIX века [History of wars at sea from ancient times to the end of the nineteenth century]. Central Naval Library (in Russian). Vol. 2. Translated by various (revised ed.). Moscow: Eksmo. pp. 444–457. ISBN 5-94661-036-8.
  - Original: Seekriegsgeschichte in ihren wichtingsten Abschnitten mit Berucksichtigung der Seetaktik (in German).
- Veselago, Feodosy Fyodorovich (1939). Краткая история русского флота [A Brief History of Russian Navy] (in Russian) (2nd ed.). Moscow, Leningrad: Военмориздат. pp. 139–140. ISBN 978-5519440530.
- Brückner, Alexander Gustavovich (1869). Война России со Швецией в 1788–1790 годах [The war of Russia with Sweden in 1788–1790] (in Russian). St. Petersburg: Печатня В Головина.
