= Pyotr Khanykov =

Russian admiral

Pyotr Ivanovich Khanykov (Russian: Пётр Иванович Ханыков; 1743–1813) was an admiral in the Imperial Russian Navy.

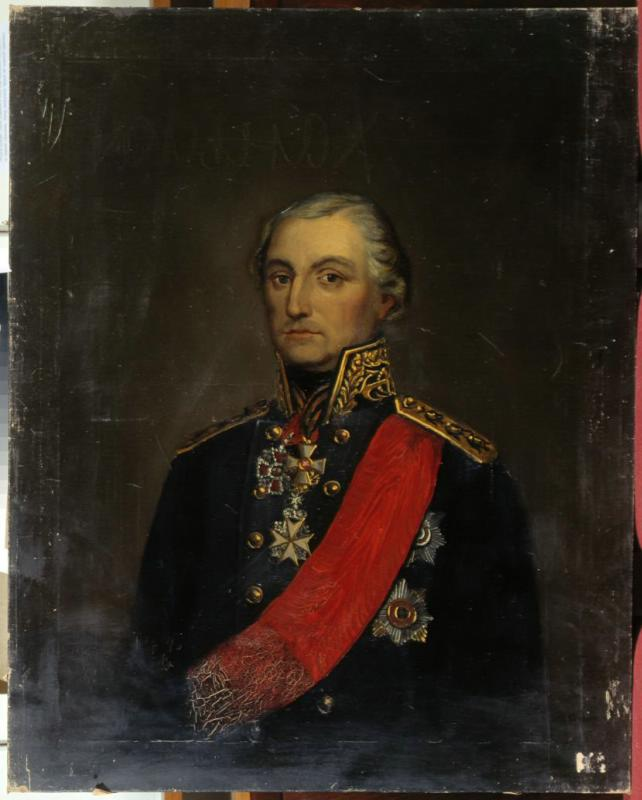

== Biography ==
Born on December 14 (25), 1743. In 1759 he entered the Naval Cadet Corps and in 1760 he was promoted to midshipman, and on May 6, 1762 - to midshipman. During this period he was sailing in the Baltic Sea and participated in the Kolberg expedition.

Then he was sent to England to study maritime practice and until 1765 he served as a volunteer on the ships of the British Royal Navy. Visited North America and Spain on British warships.

After returning on April 29, 1766, he was promoted to the rank of lieutenant.

In 1770 he participated in the Morea operation, in the Battle of Chesma and the blockade of the Dardanelles.

In 1772, he participated in the landing of Rear Admiral Samuil Greig under the fortress of Chesma.

On April 26, 1776, he was promoted to the rank of lieutenant commander, and on January 7, 1778, to the rank of captain of the 2nd rank and was appointed to command the 66-gun ship Tvyordy. In 1779 he commanded the 32-gun frigate Natalia.

On January 1, 1781, he was promoted to the rank of captain of the 1st rank.

Since 1781, he was a member of the "Neptune to Hope" Masonic lodge in Kronstadt, led by Spiridov, Alexei Grigorievich and Greig, Samuil Karlovich.

From 1783 to 1785 he was the commander of the Caspian Flotilla.

In 1786-1788 he commanded the 100-gun ship Saratov.

On September 22, 1787, he was promoted to the rank of captain, major general.

On April 14, 1789, he was promoted to the rank of Rear Admiral.

In 1790 he took part in the Battle of Reval, for which he received the Order of St. Vladimir, 2nd class, and in the Battle of Vyborg, for which he received the Order of St. George, 3rd class, and a golden sword with the inscription "For Bravery."

On September 2, 1793, he was promoted to the rank of vice admiral, and on December 5 of the same year he was appointed chief commander of the galley fleet and port.

In 1795-1796 he commanded a squadron (12 battleships and 8 frigates), which participated together with the British fleet in the blockade of the coast of the Batavian Republic.

May 9, 1799 promoted to admiral. In 1801 he was appointed chief commander of the Kronstadt port. He was also the chief director of the Baltic Navigator School.

In 1803, he sent a Russian-American expedition from the port of Kronstadt, consisting of the ships Nadezhda and Neva.

In 1808 he commanded a squadron against the Anglo-Swedish squadron in the Gulf of Finland. For actions during this period, he was found guilty of an imprudent oversight, weakness in command, slowness, since he did not prevent the connection of the British ships with the Swedish fleet and retired, "having no reason", to the Baltic Port, losing the ship Vsevolod; demoted to privates for a month. The verdict was not confirmed by Alexander I, who ordered that the trial of Khanykov be forgotten "in respect of his former service".

He was dismissed in 1809 for failure to comply with the highest orders.

Died December 10 (22), 1813. He was buried at the Lazarevskoe Cemetery of the Alexander Nevsky Lavra (VIII section of the necropolis of the 18th century).
