= Battle of Öland (1789) =

Naval battle on 26 July 1789 during the Russo-Swedish War

Coordinates: 56.664895°N 16.636477°E

- Part of Russo-Swedish War (1788–1790)
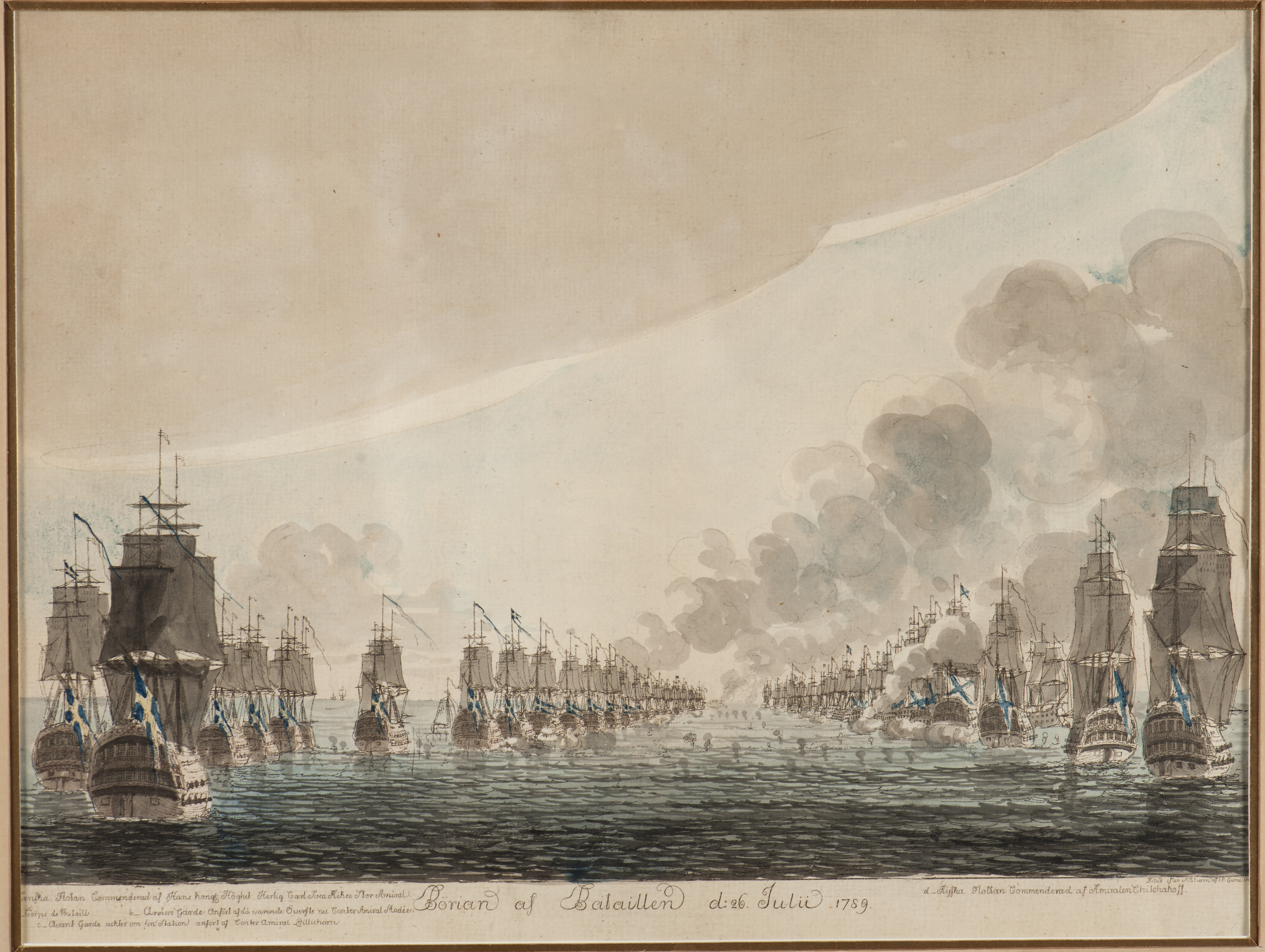
- The Battle of Öland, depiction by Johan Petter Cumelin
Date	26 July (15 July OS), 1789
Location	Near the island of Öland, Baltic Sea
Result	See § Aftermath

Belligerents
Swedish Navy	Imperial Russian Navy

Commanders and leaders
Prince Charles, Duke of Södermanland	Vasily Chichagov

Strength
21 ships of the line; 9 large frigates; 4 light frigates	21 ships of the line; 10 frigates

Casualties and losses
7 dead; 16 wounded	32 dead; 187 wounded

The Battle of Öland (Note: Russian: Эландский бой) was a naval battle that took place on 26 July 1789 during the Russo-Swedish War (1788–1790).

== Background ==
The Swedish battlefleet had spent the winter at Karlskrona and was struck by relapsing fever epidemic during the stay. The epidemic had started from the capture of the Russian ship of the line Vladislav during the Battle of Hogland in 1788. From the captured sailors the disease had spread widely through the fleet during its prolonged stay at Sveaborg in 1788 and was carried with the fleet to Karlskrona later that year. Fitting ships for the sealing season proceeded very slowly and was greatly hindered by the losses suffered due to the illness to the crews. From December 1788 to September 1789 a total of 26,249 were treated for sickness in naval hospitals at Karlskrona alone of whom 5,286 perished while the total death toll of the epidemics is assumed to be around 15,000 lives. By the end of June thousands of infantrymen had to be sent as reinforcements for the fleet. Regardless of the obstacles Admiral Otto Henrik Nordenskiöld who was responsible for refitting was able to ready a fleet of 21 ships of the line and 8 frigates for sailing by 6 June albeit without crews.

The Russian fleet had spent the winter of 1788–1789 split into several elements at Copenhagen, Reval and Kronstadt. Together with newly built ships and effective repairs of ships damaged earlier the Russians were planning to deploy around 40 ships capable to taking part in a battle line with a total complement of roughly 30 000 men. Admiral Samuel Grieg who had commanded the Russian fleet at the Battle of Hogland had perished in the autumn of 1788 and Admiral Von Dessin who had commanded the elements of the Russian fleet deployed to Copenhagen was removed from command. They were replaced respectively by Admirals Vasily Chichagov and Timofei Kozljaninov. The goal for the Russian naval operations in 1789 was to combine the separated fleet elements and then engage the Swedish fleet as soon as possible while meanwhile providing forces to uphold the blockades of the shipping routes along the Finnish coast.

Lack of crews prevented the Swedish fleet from any training or exercises and it was effectively confined to the docks. The fleet was finally able to set sail on 6 July despite that several ships were still undermanned, several lacking more than one hundred men from their complements. Having assembled 21 ships of the line and 8 large frigates under his flag, Prince Charles, Duke of Södermanland, decided to intercept the Russian fleet near the island of Öland before all of the elements of the Russian fleet would be able to link up. Admiral Otto Henrik Nordenskjöld acted as flag-captain to the Duke Charles.

== Battle ==
After setting sail the Swedish fleet patrolled the waters between Skåne, Rügen, Bornholm and Sjælland in the southern Baltic Sea. The fleet was still not free from diseases (mainly the relapsing fever) and several small dispatch vessels were used for shipping healthy men to fleet while transporting ever growing number of sick back to Karlskrona. On 23 July the Swedish fleet received news that the 35 strong Russian fleet had been seen outside of Gotland and finally at noon on 25 July the first Russian ships were sighted. Both fleets took northerly headings and the Swedish tried to close in the distance.

The Russian fleet attempted to slip between the Swedes and Karlskrona but when it became clear that it would not succeed the Russians were content with just keeping distance to the Swedes. Winds were strengthening which prevented either side from taking action later on 25 July 1789. On the morning of 26 July the fleets again sighted each other and the Swedes again attempted to close in and engage the Russians but were unable to do so as the Russian fleet carefully avoided it. A further problem for the Swedes was that the rear-guard commanded by Admiral Per Lilliehorn had become separated from the rest of the fleet and did not rejoin it despite repeatedly being ordered to do so.

The Russian fleet continued evading the Swedish one, trying to slip between the Swedes and their home port. Finally by 1400 on 26 July the first ships reached the cannon range and started the battle. Varying winds forced battle to pause between 1600 and 1800 but it later recommenced. Fighting continued until 2000 when the Russian fleet turned towards the east. Swedish fleet was unable to follow as the undermanned crews could not handle both guns and sails simultaneously. During the battle the fleets remained a fair distance apart and the cannons were fired at their maximum ranges and thus had little effect. Misfiring cannons and barrel explosions were the main cause of losses on both sides. During the fight three trailing ships of the Russian fleet were left separated from the rest of the fleet. Several Swedish ships were ordered to engage these stragglers but the Swedish ships turned away before even reaching the cannon range. Captains of the ships later claimed that they turned away from the Russian ships according to orders from Admiral Per Liljehorn who kept his ships away from the fight.

Swedes were able to receive reinforcements and ship out the sick on 28 July after which the Swedish turned again to chase the Russians but without success as the Russians repeatedly avoided engaging the Swedish fleet. Similar action was repeated on following days until on 30 July the continuously worsening sickness amongst the crews forced the Swedes to seriously consider returning to their base as roughly 2 500 men had become sick after the fleet had set sail. On 31 July the wind turned which was seen as favorable for arrival of the Russian squadron from Copenhagen. To avoid being caught between two Russian fleets the Swedish fleet started back towards Karlskrona. On the same day the Russian squadron from Copenhagen joined with the Russian fleet.

== Aftermath ==
For three days the fleets maneuvered within sight of each other, but finally the Swedes retreated to the naval base at Karlskrona. The battle ended in a draw or Russian victory, one way or another the Russians remained in control of the Baltic Sea. The epidemic that still had not ended at Karlskrona then confined the Swedish fleet to its anchorage for most of the remainder of the year.

Per Liljehorn was stripped of his admiral's rank even before the fleet returned to Karlskrona. Suspicions concerning Liljehorn arose after the debacle; it was widely suspected that the Russians had bribed him. A court martial convicted him but the government declined to execute him. Chichagov too was investigated for his inaction and avoidance of battle. However, the court martial found him not guilty because his orders explicitly stated that he should first rendezvous with the Russian squadron from Copenhagen before engaging the Swedish fleet.

== The rival fleets ==
=== Sweden ===
Wladislaff 76
Enigheten 74
Götha Lejon 74
Kung Adolf Fredrik 74
Kung Gustaf III 74
Louise Ulrika 74
Sophia Magdalena 74
Fäderneslandet 66
Äran 64
Dristigheten 64
Dygden 64
Försightigheten 64
Hedvig Elisabeth Charlotta 64
Manligheten 64
Ömheten 64
Prins Carl 64
Prins Fredrik Adolf 64
Tapperheten 64
Rättvisan 62
Wasa 62
Riksens Ständer 60
Gripen 44
Uppland 44
Euredice 40
Fröya 40
Galathea 40
Minerva 40
Thetis 40
Zemire 40

=== Russia ===
Rostislav 100
Dvyenadtsat Apostolov 100
Knyaz Vladimir 100
Iezekiil 78
Kir Ioann 74
Mstislav 74
Pobyedoslav 74
Prints Gustav 74
Sv. Elena 74
Sv. Petr 74
Yaroslav 74
Boleslav 66
Deris 66
Izyaslav 66
Pamyat Evstafia 66
Rodislav 66
Svyatoslav 66
Viktor 66
Vysheslav 66

== Bibliography ==
- R. C. Anderson Naval Wars in the Baltic, 1522–1850.
- (in Finnish) Johnsson, Raoul (2011). Grönroos, Maria; Karttunen, Ilkka (eds.). Kustaa III ja suuri merisota [Gustaf III and the Great Naval War] (in Finnish). Helsinki: John Nurminen Foundation. ISBN 978-952-9745-31-9.
- Егоршина, Петрова (2023). История русской армии [The history of the Russian Army] (in Russian). Moscow: Moskva. ISBN 978-5-699-42397-2.
- Mattila, Tapani (1983). Meri maamme turvana [Sea safeguarding our country] (in Finnish). Jyväskylä: K. J. Gummerus Osakeyhtiö. ISBN 951-99487-0-8.
- Magnus Ullman: Från Hogland till Svensksund [From Hogland to Svensksund]
