= Capture of the frigate Kilduin =

- Part of Russo-Swedish War (1788–1790)
Date	August, 1788
Location	Marstrand, Sweden
Result	Swedish victory

Belligerents
Sweden	Russian Empire; Imperial Russian Navy

Commanders and leaders
Johan Petter Ternstedt (WIA)	Unknown

Strength
1 rowboat 6 men	1 frigate 94 men

Casualties and losses
+1 injured	1 frigate lost 94 captured 128 cannons 16,000 cannonballs

The capture of the frigate Kilduin was a brief altercation between Russian and Swedish forces during the beginning Russo-Swedish war of 1788–1790.

== Background ==
The outbreak of the Russo-Swedish war of 1788–1790 had made the Swedish government timorous of their western coast as Russian and Danish ships there could pose a threat; the response to this threat was the deployment of several frigates. Onboard one of the deployed frigates, Bellona, was Johan Petter Ternstedt, who had been ordered to patrol the waters of Marstrand when he spotted the lightly manned Russian frigate Kilduin anchored in the direction of Skagen.

== Battle ==
Upon spotting the frigate, Ternstedt gathered five men and started rowing towards Kilduin in the dark of night. After eventually reaching the ship, the Swedes silently attached their rowboat to the ship's hull and boarded the ship. Fighting soon broke out on the deck between the Swedes and the Russian sailors on deck watch, with the latter quickly being overpowered. After the altercation, the Swedes quickly screwed down the ship's hatches so that the crew below deck would not be able to come out.

== Aftermath ==
Kilduin was brought back to Marstrand with Ternstedt being deemed a hero. On board the ship were a lot of supplies which would aid Sweden in her war effort against Russia; it included 128 cannons, 16,000 cannonballs, and 500 rifles. The 94-strong crew that was on board the frigate would be escorted to Jönköping by the Bohuslän Regiment.

Kilduin would be in Swedish service for another 7 years before being sold in 1795.

== See also ==
- Russo-Swedish War (1788–1790)
- Battle of Hogland
