= Frederic Thesiger =

Frederic Thesiger may refer to:

- Frederick Thesiger (naval officer) (1758–1805), British and Russian naval officer
- Frederic Thesiger, 1st Baron Chelmsford, (1794–1878), Lord Chancellor of England
- Frederic Thesiger, 2nd Baron Chelmsford, (1827–1905), British general
- Frederic Thesiger, 1st Viscount Chelmsford, (1868–1933), Viceroy of India
