= Robert Crown =

British navy officer (1753–1841)

Robert (Roman) Crown
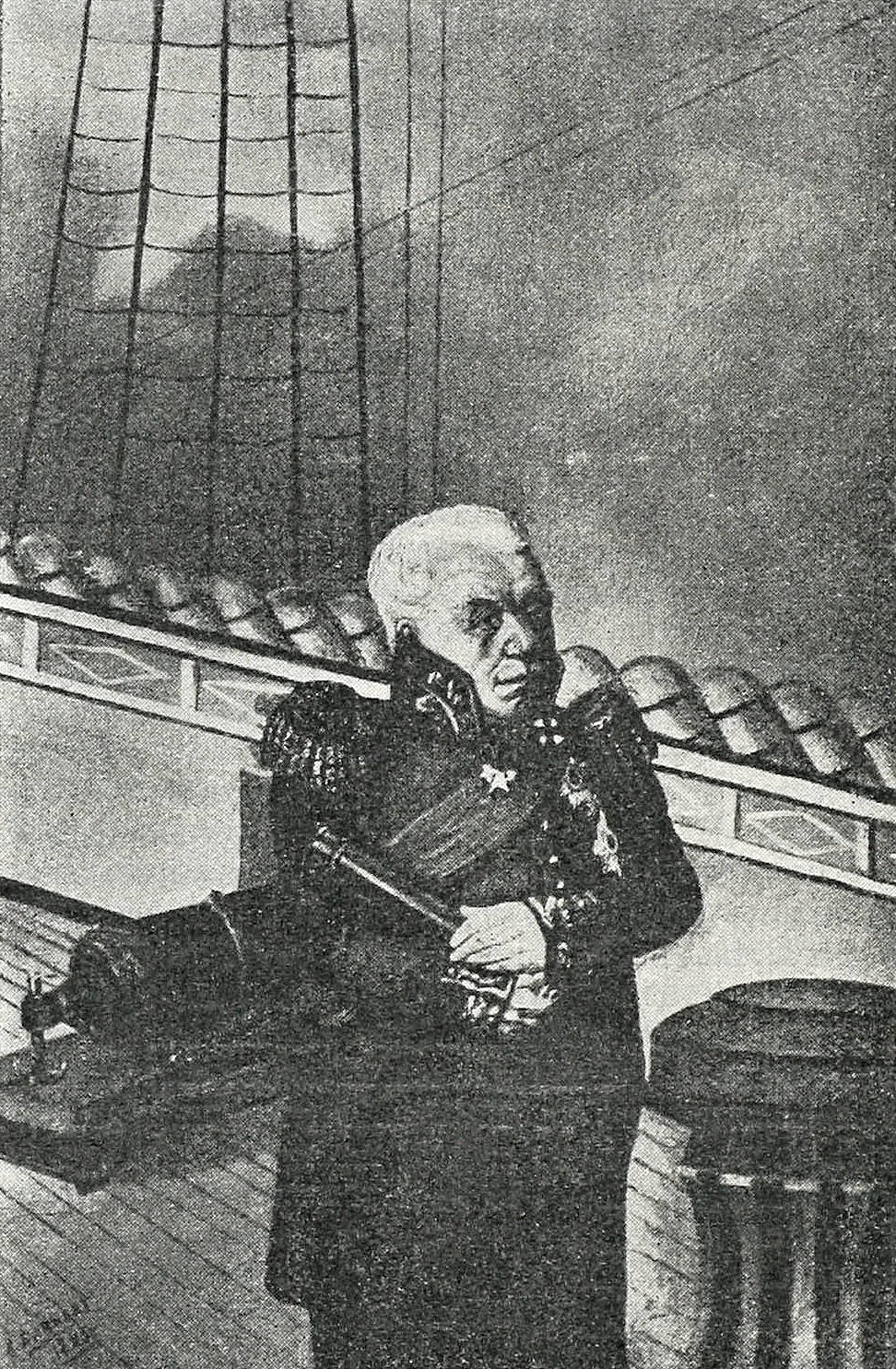
- Born: 21 December 1753; Perth, Scotland
- Died: 21 April 1841 (aged 87); Saint Petersburg, Russian Empire
- Military career
- Allegiance: Great Britain; Russia
- Branch: Royal Navy; Imperial Russian Navy
- Service years: 1788–1831 (Russia)
- Rank: Lieutenant (Britain); Admiral (Russia)
- Conflicts: American Revolutionary War; Russo-Swedish War (1788–1790); Capture of Venus; Napoleonic Wars
- Awards: Order of St. Vladimir (3rd degree); Order of St. George

Roman (Robert) Vasilievich Crown (Russian: Роман Васильевич Кроун; 21 December 1753 [O.S. 1 January 1754] – 21 April [O.S. 3 May] 1841) was a navy officer in British and Russian service. In the latter he eventually became an admiral and served in the Russo-Swedish War and the Napoleonic Wars.

== Life ==
=== Early naval career in British service ===
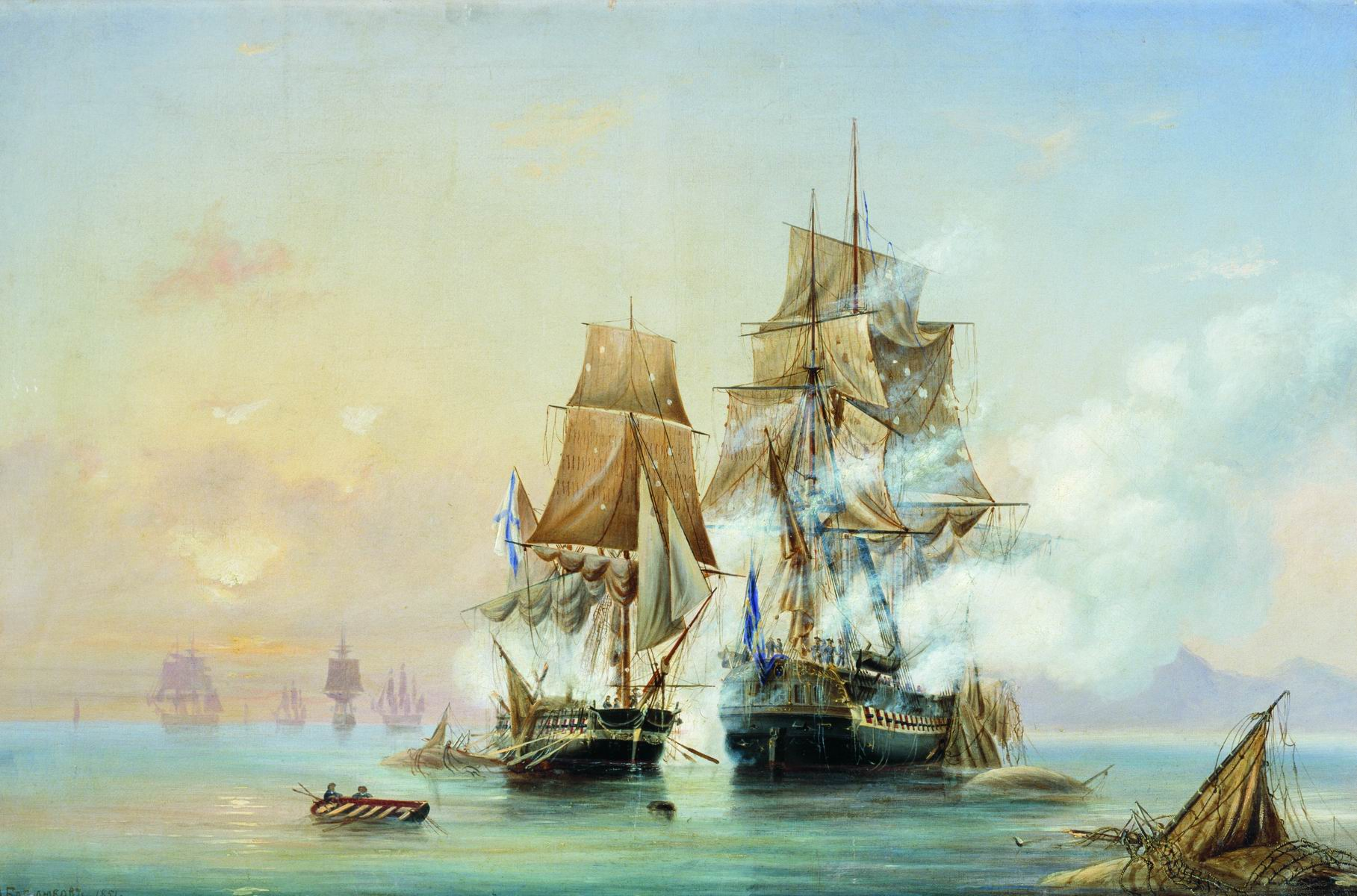
Capture of Venus in 1788. Painting by Alexey Bogolyubov

Robert Crown was born in Perth, Scotland; he came from a family of Scottish tenants said to have been related to the Gregor clan. He began his maritime service with the Merchant Navy, joined the British Royal Navy (as a navigator, on the frigate Odeon, in squadrons under Admiral Edward Vernon in India about 1778) and participated in the American Revolutionary War. In early 1788, he became an officer in the Imperial Russian Navy, keeping his rank of a lieutenant.

=== Career in the Russian–Swedish war ===
Already on 10 March 1788 Crown was promoted to captain-lieutenant and appointed commander of the 22-gun cutter Merkuriy, which was part of the Baltic Fleet squadron Copenhagen. On this ship, Captain Crown carried out patrol services during the Russo-Swedish war in the Baltic Sea. His most important success was the capture of the Swedish 44-gun frigate Venus in the fjord of Christiania on 21 May 1789. Crown was promoted to 2nd rank captain and awarded the Order of St. George, 4th class. He received command over Venus and led it in the battle of Reval and in the battle of Vyborg Bay in 1790. In the course of the latter he captured the ship of the line Rättvisan ("Justice", built 1783). In recognition of his merits, he was awarded the Order of Saint Vladimir, 3rd class, and promoted to 1st rank captain (captain-commodore). In 1791, Crown, together with many other naval officers of British origin, was transferred to the Black Sea in expectation of war with England.

=== Promoted to vice-admiral and later fate ===
During the war of the 2nd anti-French coalition, Crown took part in the attempted Anglo-Russian invasion of the Netherlands. He was appointed rear admiral in January 1799, while on the 66-gun ship Izyaslav serving in the Baltic, and vice admiral in February 1804. From 1802 to 1804, he was in the Baltic fleet on the 74-gun ship Yaroslav. After resting ashore in 1805–1807, he went into a transient retirement on account of the state of war between Russia and England from 1808 to 1812.

In 1812, he led a Russian squadron with six ships from Arkhangelsk to Great Britain and was involved in the blockade of France. In 1814, he was blockading the Dutch coast together with an English squadron, and after the Bourbon Restoration, he transported King Louis XVIII from London to France on board his flagship.

After the Napoleonic Wars, he returned to the Baltic fleet. On 8 February 1824, he was promoted to full admiral. He retired in 1831 and took residence permanently in St. Petersburg, where he died 10 years later.

== Family ==
Crown was married three times, first in 1775 to Sarah Primrose (1759–1780), second to Martha Knight (1754–1839). He had several children from the second, and one son from the third marriage. Two of his sons with Martha Knight became Russian vice-admirals in the 1870s, i.e. Alexander Egorovich (Malclein Alexander Crown; 1823–1900) and Thomas Yegorovich (Thomas Frederick; 1826–1893).
