= Battle of Uttismalm =

1789 battle of the Russo-Swedish War

- Part of the Russo-Swedish War (1788–90)
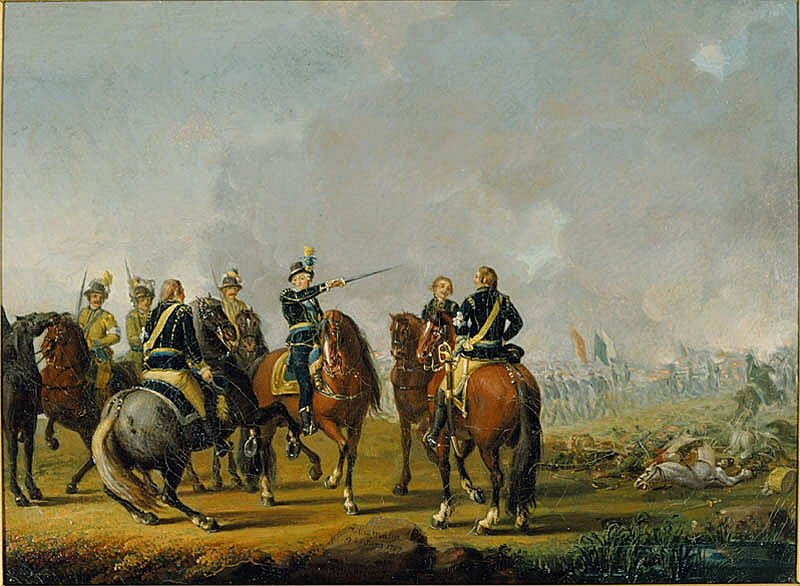
- Gustav III in the battle of Uttismalm by Pehr Hilleström
Date	June 28, 1789
Location	Uttismalm, Finland
Result	Swedish victory

Belligerents
Sweden	(Russia) Russian Empire

Commanders and leaders
Gustav III of Sweden	

Strength
2,500 men	2,500 men

Casualties and losses
14 killed 88 wounded	100 killed 300 wounded

The Battle of Uttismalm took place on June 28, 1789 during Gustav III's Russian War, Sweden won over the Russian Empire.

The Swedish troops were under the personal command of the king, Gustav III, and numbered about 2,500 men. The Russian troops were of equal size. The battle ended with a Swedish victory and the Russians lost around 100 dead and 300 wounded in the battle. The Swedes lost 14 dead and 88 men wounded.

== Prelude ==
Gustav III arrived in Finland in June 1789, to begin the campaigns of the second year of the war. The Swedish land forces were estimated at the mentioned time to amount to between 15 and 20,000 men, mainly distributed among the Savolax brigade under Curt von Stedingk's command of 4,000 men and the main force under the king's own supreme command of 11-12,000 men, standing behind the Kymmene river, from Finland the bay up to Heinola.

Russia mobilized superior forces for the year's campaign - perhaps as many as 40,000 men - and on 9 June 1789 they crossed the Savolax border with about 11,000 men, divided into two columns. Their aim was to annihilate Stedingk's division, or at least to force him to retreat and thus expose the flank of the main army to a decisive attack. Stedingk took up a strong defensive position at Porrassalmi, where with his inferior troops, after a heroic engagement, he succeeded in stopping the Russians, who, despite the deployment of an elite unit of grenadiers - the grenadiers suffered heavy losses after repeatedly attacking the Swedish position - did not succeed in completing its combat mission. Stedingk was later forced to retreat to Jorois, northeast of St. Michel, but succeeded here in stopping further Russian advances, after which the Savolax front was stabilized.

Gustav III had in the meantime awaited the development of events in Savolax, but after the news of the Swedish victory at Porrassalmi, he decided to try to ease the pressure on Stedingk's division, by going offensive himself against the Russians on his front. Major General Kaulbars, was ordered to protect the Swedish main army's left flank by taking a position at Heinola. Gustav III now ordered Generals Siegroth and von Platen to join him with their detachments at Värälä, which happened on June 25, after which the main Swedish force now amounted to 5,000-6,000 men.

On the same day, the crossing of the Kymmene river was prepared, i.a. by field artillery being posted on a height opposite the crossing point, after which the Swedes carried out the over march to the other side under the cover of artillery fire and light infantry who skirmished with Russian hunters and Cossacks who, however, offered only insignificant resistance. The Swedes then entrenched themselves in Kouvola on the east side of the river, where regrouping and strength gathering could take place during the following days.

== Battle ==
On June 28, the king broke out at the head of approximately 2,500 men from Västmanland's infantry regiment, Kronoberg's regiment, Östgöta's infantry regiment, Västerbotten's regiment, the Karelian dragoon corps and Finnish hunting units. They took the road towards Davidstad, while Siegroth was left at Värälä, to protect the river crossing there and counter any Russian advances from Fredrikshamnshållet. During the day, Gustav III found out that the main Russian force was at Uttismalm in the Swedes' line of advance and ordered an advance. The Swedish vanguard under General Wilhelm Mauritz Pauli consisted of hunter soldiers and the Karleska dragoon corps. These discovered a Russian outpost about 4 km west of Utti's village. The Swedish vanguard immediately went on the attack, which is why the entire Russian army division lined up in battle order about 3 km west of Utti's village. The Russian outpost now retreated pursued by the Swedish vanguard.

The Russian units that lined up in order of battle consisted of 2 battalions of Russian hunters, the Velikoluksky Regiment and one battalion of Russian life grenadiers in the first line. The second line consisted of a few squadrons of life cuirassiers, a couple of companies of Cossacks, Kyrgyz Tartars and 4-6 guns.

The first battalion of the Västmanland regiment was now ordered forward to support the vanguard. The battle immediately became fierce and Captain Abraham Zakaria's Coronation Sword was wounded, Lieutenant Rosen was shot to death and Ensign Baron Vilhelm Reinhold Leuhusen was wounded in the side. The king now went to the Västmanland regiment to support them and sent a battalion from the Västerbotten regiment to their aid, while at the same time he ordered the other battalions from the Västerbotten regiment to get around a mountain and try to cover the Russians' right wing. However, these were met with fierce resistance from Russian hunters, and the king then separated his 24 life dragoons who had to sit down and form hunting units that cleared the forest for the Westerners' second battalion.

General Philip von Platen now hastened with the remainder of the troops to the king's rescue. In part, he pulled out two six-pounder cannons at the same time as he brought Kronoberg's regiment and Östgöta's infantry regiment. This operation was completely successful under the cover of the artillery, which again proved its effectiveness and striking power.

The enemy now fell back under wild fire towards the main Russian position no one at Uttismalm, where they prepared for battle. During the next hour the Swedes advanced in pouring rain towards the enemy; Gustavus III kept himself at the head of the troops at all times, spurring them forward by exhortations of encouragement and by speaking to officers and individual soldiers. On arriving at Uttismalm, the king gave a short speech to the troops, after which the battle began along the entire line. Both sides fired volley upon volley at each other, but without much effectiveness due to the poor visibility and it all developed into a skirmish on a larger scale, rather than a veritable battle, before the king and von Platen finally decided to repeat the earlier ruse, by sending a battalion of Crown Bergers around the left flank of the Russians, while attacks were ordered along the entire line. When the Russians saw themselves attacked from both the front and the flank, they did not want to fight any longer and retreated in the direction of Kaipiais, pursued at a distance by a detachment of life dragoons from the Life Regiment of Horse and the battalion from the Östgöta Infantry Regiment.

In their flight, the Russians had left on the battlefield their dead and wounded, ammunition wagons, banners of the Velikoluksky regiment, large quantities of food and provisions, and a great deal of bills of exchange in the Russian camp.

The losses during the battle had been surprisingly small: on the Swedish side, one officer shot dead and two wounded, and 14 soldiers killed and 86 wounded. The Swedes buried 40 dead Russians, and the total loss was probably about 100 dead and about 300 wounded and captured.

== Aftermath ==
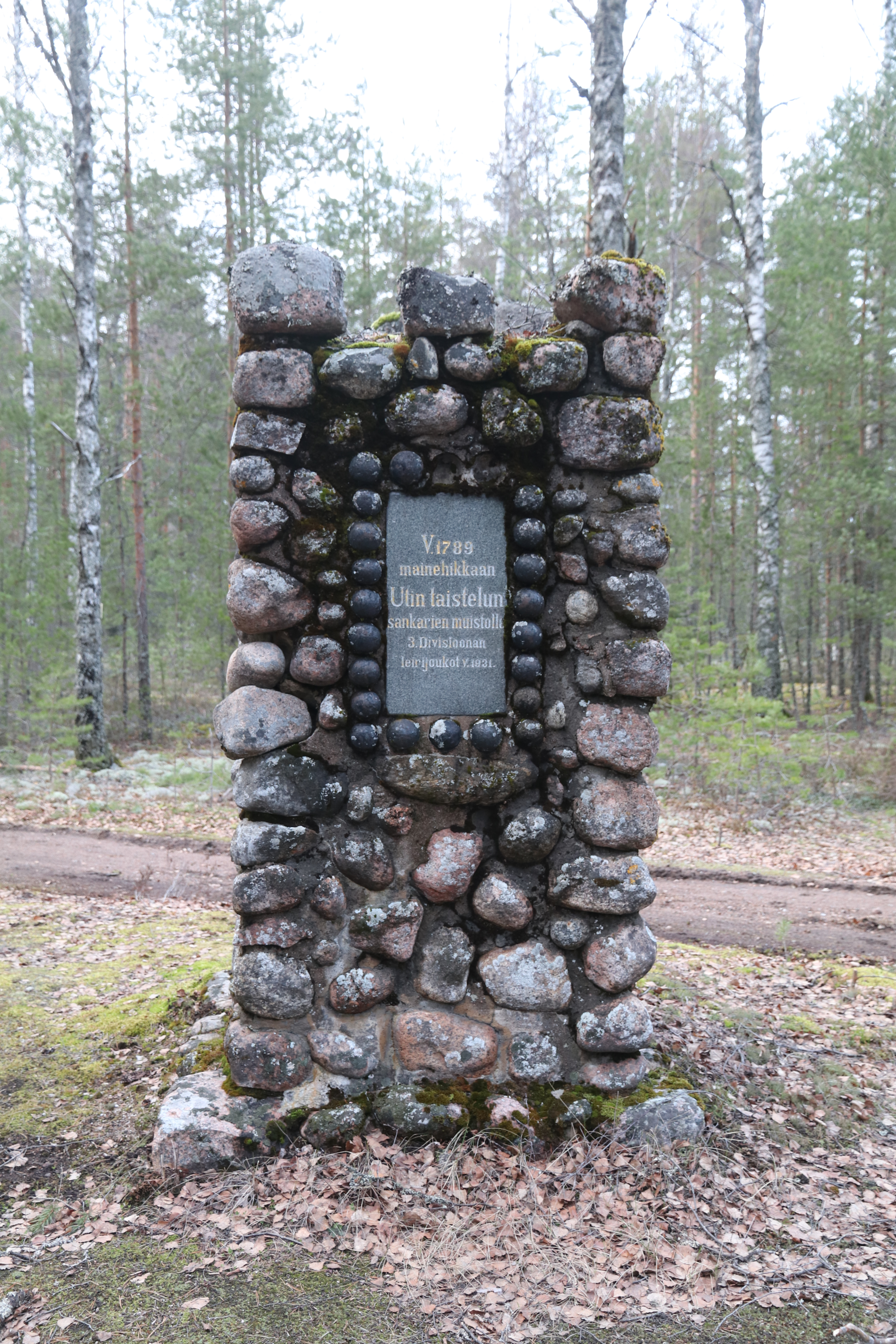
Memorial of the battle of Uttismalm erected in 1931

After the victorious battle, the king lined up the troops on the battlefield and he appointed General Pauli on the spot Commander of the Order of the Sword for the coolness and courage he had shown during the first battle with the vanguard. Major Fougberg of the Västmanland Regiment, Major af Donner of the Västerbotten Regiment, Major Hierta of the Finnish Hunter Corps, Major Carl Gustaf von Platen, Captain Gyllensvärd of the Kronoberg Regiment, Captain Risbeth of the Östgöta Infantry, Lieutenant Brunow of the Finnish Hunter Corps and Lieutenants Calmberg were appointed Knights of the Order of the Sword. and Tallberg at the Artillery Regiment.

In addition, several officers were promoted. The injured captain Kröningsvärd was promoted to major, for example. Two non-commissioned officers at the Kronoberg regiment, sergeants von Hehn and Malmén, were promoted to ensigns and a sergeant at the Kyttreus Artillery regiment was promoted to second lieutenant.

The king then thanked all participating regiments and corps individually, and then also distributed gratuities and rewards to soldiers, non-commissioned officers and officers.
