= Valentin Musin-Pushkin =

Russian military and government official

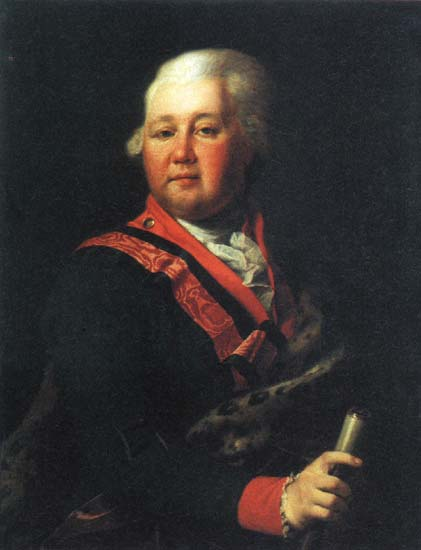
Count Valentin Musin-Pushkin

Count Valentin Platonovich Musin-Pushkin (Russian: Граф Валенти́н Плато́нович Му́син-Пу́шкин; 17 December [O.S. 6 December] 1735 – 20 July [O.S. 8 July] 1804) was a Russian military and government official who reached the rank of field marshal.

== Biography ==
Scion of a large and distinguished noble family, Musin-Pushkin was the son of Count Platon Ivanovich (1698-1745) and Marfa Petrovna Cherkasskaya. His father had suffered under the reign of Empress Anna Ioannovna, having been falsely accused of disloyalty and underwent a long period of imprisonment and possible torture. Valentin enlisted into the Russian Imperial Guard in 1747 and would see service in the Seven Years' War, reaching the rank of 2nd major of the Horse Guards. He served as a member of the honor guard at the coronation of Catherine the Great, and in turn was given a high rank in the civil service and rewarded part of the estate that had been confiscated from his father, along with 600 souls to work on it. By 1769 he had been promoted to chamberlain.

His military career was not neglected either. A colonel by 1765, he saw active service in the Russo-Turkish War of 1768–1774 under his Father-in-Law General-in-chief Vasily Dolgorukov, commander of the 2nd (Crimean) Field Army. Major General Musin-Pushkin was a leading participant in the storming of Bendery in 1770, for which he was rewarded the Order of St. George, 3rd class, the Order of Alexander Nevsky and a promotion to lieutenant general. He would be further promoted in 1782 to full general, and made an adjutant general the following year.

The General managed to secure his future political position by befriending Grand Duke Pavel Petrovich, the future Paul of Russia. This created some conflict with his relationship to Catherine, who had a troubled relationship regarding her son, but Musin-Pushkin managed to approach this issue with great tact and never compromised his personal obligations to the Empress. In 1786 he was awarded the Order of St. Andrew and made Vice-President of the War College, the commanding body of the Russian Imperial Army. By 1787 he had been made a member of Catherine's Council of Advisers.

With the outbreak of the Russo-Swedish War (1788–90), General Musin-Pushkin was made Chief Commander of the Russian forces, numbering some 15,000 men. By 1790, Catherine was disappointed with his performance and had him replaced as commander by Count Ivan Saltykov. Nevertheless, Musin-Pushkin continued to be showered with awards for his war service, including the Gold Sword for Bravery, the Order of St. Vladimir, and Diamonds to his St. Andrew's Star. Under Paul, the Count was made chief of the Chevalier Guard Regiment and field marshal in 1797 but would see no further military service before his death seven years later. His remains were interred in Simonov Monastery.

His marriage to Praskovya Dolgorukaya produced two children, Anastasia and Vasily. The latter would go on to have some success in the Diplomatic Corps during the first decades of the 19th century.
