= James Trevenen =

Royal Navy and Imperial Russian Navy officer

- Born: 1 January 1760; Rosewarne, Camborne, Cornwall
- Died: 9 August 1790 (aged 30); Kronstadt, Russian Empire
- Military career
- Allegiance: Kingdom of Great Britain; Russian Empire
- Branch: Royal Navy; Imperial Russian Navy
- Service years: 1776 – 1787 (Royal Navy); 1787 – 1790 (Imperial Russian Navy)
- Rank: Lieutenant (Royal Navy); Captain (Imperial Russian Navy)
- Commands: Rodislav
- Conflicts: American Revolutionary War; Russo-Swedish War; Battle of Hoagland; Battle of Vyborg Bay

James Trevenen (1 January 1760 – 9 July 1790) was an officer in the Royal Navy and the Imperial Russian Navy.

Born in Cornwall "of a very respectable family", he was educated at the Royal Naval Academy at Portsmouth and went to sea in 1776 as a midshipman on the Resolution under Captain James Cook, where he assisted Cook as a surveyor and navigator. On completing the voyage in 1780 he was promoted to lieutenant by the Earl of Sandwich, and joined HMS Conquestador. In April 1781 he sailed under James King, whom he had served with in Resolution, until the end of the war in 1783.

Unhappy with peacetime life, Trevenen attempted to get employment from the Admiralty in 1787, but was unsuccessful. As a result, he drew up a plan for a voyage of exploration, seeking to establish a sailing route between Kamchatka and Japan and northern China. This plan was put before Catherine II of Russia, who took a strong interest in it, and promptly sent an officer to England to bring Trevenen to Russia and invite him to execute the plan. This proposed expedition is sometimes called the Mulovsky expedition.

== Russian Navy ==
Trevenen arrived in St. Petersburg in late 1787, but the expedition's plans were disrupted by the outbreak of the Russo-Turkish War, and he was prevailed upon to take the command of a ship of the line in the Russian Navy, ranking as a post captain in the Russian service. The Russian ambassador, Semyon Vorontsov, wrote to Nikolai Mordvinov with the good news that he had recruited four British officers, Trevenen, Robin Crown, Samuel Marshall, and Frederick Thesiger.

Trevenen fought in the Baltic throughout the Russo-Swedish War, receiving several honours. At the Battle of Hoagland on 17 July 1788, he commanded the 74-gun Rodislav, and on 7 September of that year commanded a detachment of four ships of the line and five frigates which captured two coastal batteries in the Barösund strait. The Russian blockade at Porkala was after 24 August 1789 under the command of Captain James Trevenen, who started the effort to break the Swedish hold on Barösund. The Russian attack against Barösund started on 18 September. The attacking force consisted of 4 ships of the line, 1 frigate and 6 cutters. Fighting continued for two hours and cost the Swedes a single galley and the Russians one ship of the line (Severny Oryol) and several others damaged, but it gained the Russians the control of the Barösund strait. Sporadic fighting in the archipelago near Porkala continued and on 23 September the Russians captured the island of Älgsjön from the Swedes, but lost it on 30 September when Swedish reinforcements under Colonel Gustaf Mauritz Armfelt arrived. The Russian fleet left the area suddenly on 23 October, possibly due to the news that the Swedish open sea fleet had set sail, which it had done on 13 October, only to return to Karlskrona on 22 October. The Russian departure opened the safe coastal sea route to Swedish transports.

At the Battle of Vyborg Bay on 4 July 1790, he acted as a commodore, but was fatally wounded by enemy fire and died on 9 August, aged 30.

== Sources ==
- Laughton, John Knox (1899). "Trevenen, James" . Dictionary of National Biography. Vol. 57. pp. 210–212.
- Mattila, Tapani (1983). Meri maamme turvana [Sea Safeguarding Our Country] (in Finnish). Jyväskylä: K. J. Gummerus Osakeyhtiö. ISBN 951-99487-0-8.
- The Annual Register, or, A view of the history, politics and literature for the year 1790. London, 1802. p. 214-5
- From Hoagland to Barezund; History of the Russian Navy
- A memoir of James Trevenen, edited by Christopher Lloyd and R.C. Anderson. Publications of the Navy Records Society, vol. 101 (London, 1959).
