= Frederick Thesiger (naval officer) =

English naval officer

Frederick Thesiger (28 March 1758 – 26 August 1805) was an English naval officer who went to sea with the East India Company and was later commissioned into the Royal Navy and the navy of the Russian Empire.

Thesiger saw active service in the American War of Independence, the Russo-Swedish War of 1788–1790, and the War of the Second Coalition. He was flag lieutenant to Rodney at the Battle of the Saintes and to Nelson at the Battle of Copenhagen and served onshore during the Napoleonic Wars.

== Early life ==
Thesiger was the eldest son of John Andrew Thesiger, originally from Saxony, by his English wife Sarah Gibson. He was baptized at St George's, Hanover Square, on 14 April 1758, with the register noting his date of birth as 28 March. The young Thesiger first went to sea in the service of the East India Company, but was accepted into the Royal Navy as a midshipman under Samuel Marshall.

His younger brother Charles Thesiger (died 1831) became comptroller and collector of customs in St Vincent and was the father of Frederic Thesiger, 1st Baron Chelmsford.

== Naval career ==
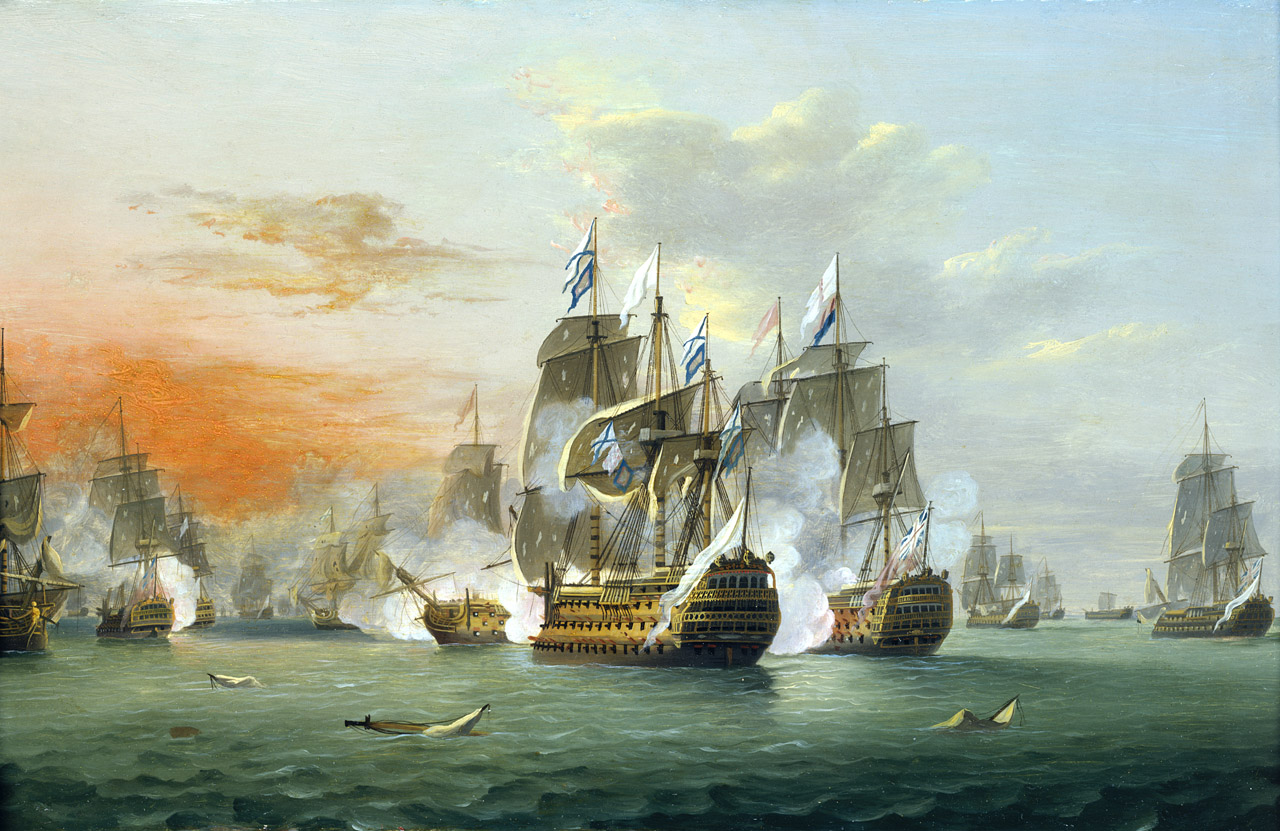
The Battle of the Saintes

In February 1782, during the American War of Independence, Admiral Sir George Rodney sailed again for the West Indies after a period of leave, and Thesiger gained a commission as acting-lieutenant on board HMS Formidable. He caught the eye of Admiral Sir Charles Douglas, captain of the fleet, and on his recommendation he was appointed as flag lieutenant to Rodney on the eve of the last day of the Battle of the Saintes. Thesiger went on serving with the fleet on the Leeward Islands Station under Admiral Hugh Pigot, and later went with Douglas when he was appointed to command the North America and West Indies Station at Halifax, Nova Scotia. The American war was ended by the Treaty of Paris in September 1783, and Thesiger returned to shore leave in England.

In 1788, a war broke out between Russia and Sweden, and Thesiger, still out of commission on half-pay, was given permission to enter the naval service of Russia. Rodney recommended him to the Russian ambassador, Semyon Vorontsov, who wrote to Nikolai Mordvinov with the good news that he had recruited four British officers, James Trevenen, Robin Crown, Samuel Marshall, and Thesiger. In 1789, Thesiger was given command of a 74-gun warship. In a naval engagement on 25 August, the Swedish admiral on board a ship called Gustavus surrendered to Thesiger. In June 1790, Thesiger was one of six English captains who fought in an action off the island of Bornholm, and the only one of the six not killed. Catherine the Great gave Thesiger the Order of St. George. He stayed in her service after the war ended in 1790. From 1792, Great Britain and Russia were allies in the French Revolutionary and Napoleonic Wars, and in 1796 Thesiger was with a Russian squadron which came to the North Sea to work with the Royal Navy in the blockade of the Texel.

After Catherine the Great died in 1797, Thesiger found her successor, Paul, less easy to work for and resigned. He was kept in St. Petersburg for a year and at last left without his arrears of pay or his prize money, and returned to England. There, he was useful to George Spencer, 2nd Earl Spencer, at the time First Lord of the Admiralty, thanks to his knowledge of the Baltic and the Russian navy.

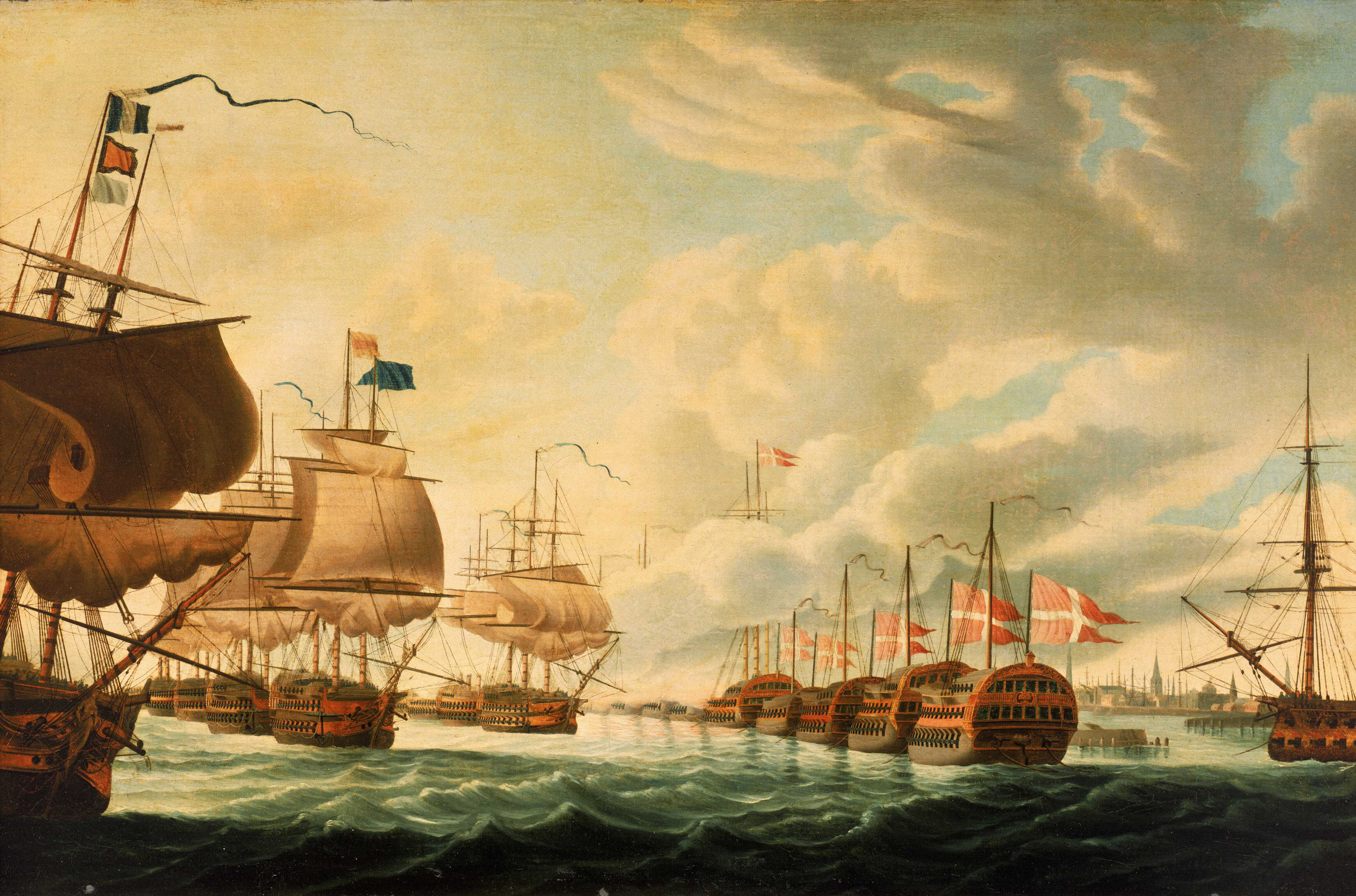
The Battle of Copenhagen, 1801

The War of the Second Coalition broke out in November 1798, and Thesiger was commissioned into the Royal Navy as a Commander. At the Battle of Copenhagen (1801) he was Nelson's aide-de-camp. In later operations in the Baltic his knowledge of the coast was valuable to the British. Returning to England with despatches from Sir Charles Morice Pole, he was well received by St Vincent, promoted to post-captain, and given permission to wear the Russian Order of St George and to call himself Sir Frederick.

On the breakdown of the Treaty of Amiens in 1803, the Napoleonic Wars began, and Thesiger was appointed as British agent for prisoners of war at Portsmouth.

He died, still unmarried, at Elson, near Portsmouth, on 26 August 1805.
