= Swedish frigate Venus (1783) =

Swedish ship

Venus
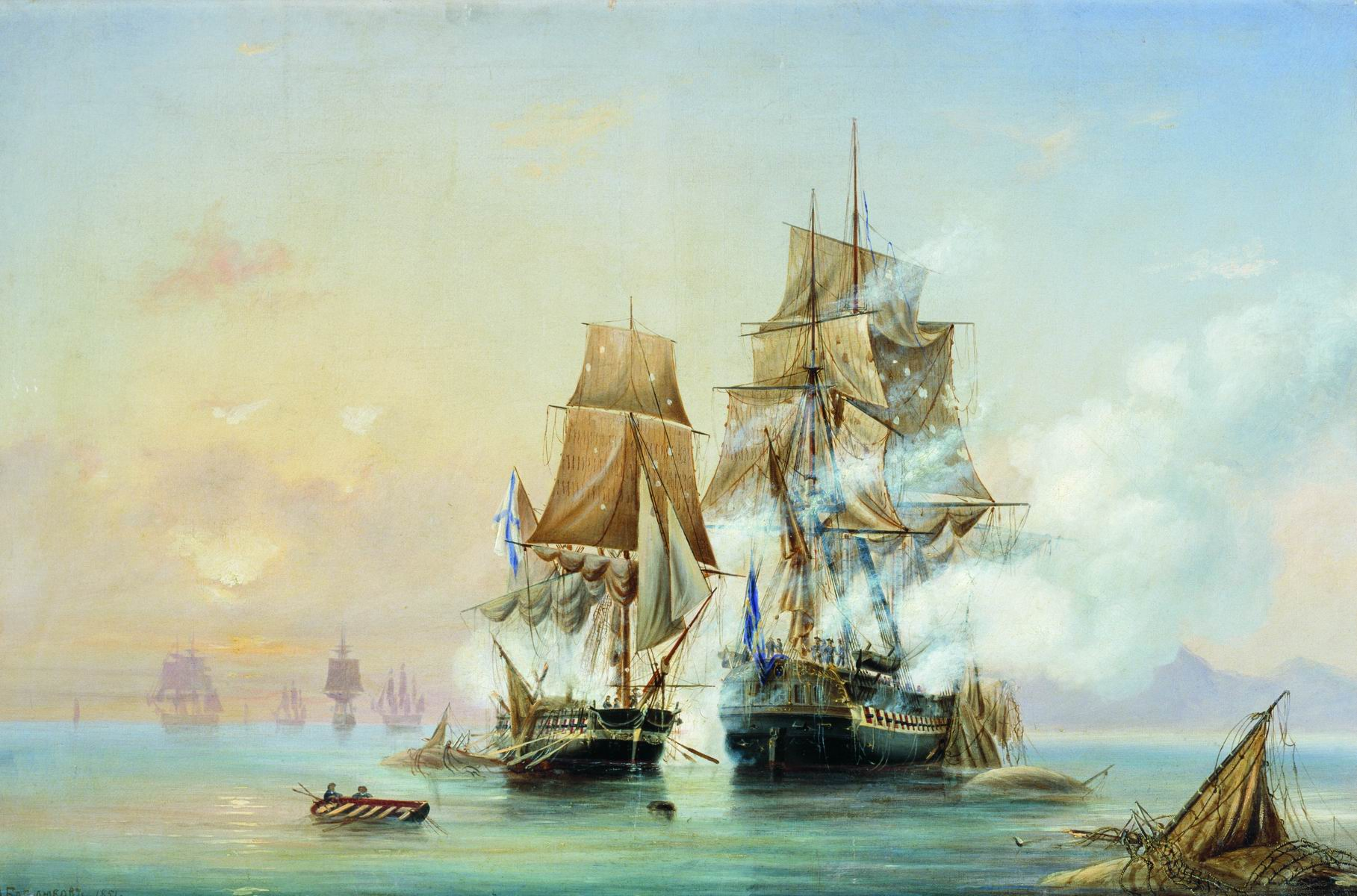
- Capturing of Swedish 44-gun frigate Venus by Russian 22-gun cutter Merkuriy of June 1, 1789. Painting by Alexey Bogolyubov (1845)

History

Sweden
- Name: Venus
- Namesake: Venus
- Builder: Karlskrona
- Laid down: 31 March 1783 (Note: All dates used in this article are Old Style)
- Launched: 19 July 1783
- Captured: 1 June 1789 by the Imperial Russian Navy

Russian Empire
- Name: Venus (Венус)
- Acquired: 1 June 1789
- Out of service: 1807
- Fate: Sold to Kingdom of Naples

Kingdom of Naples
- Acquired: c.1807

General characteristics
- Type: Bellona-class 44-gun frigate
- Length: 128 ft (39.0 m) (p/p)
- Beam: 32 ft (9.8 m)
- Draft: 10 ft (3.0 m)
- Complement: 160
- Armament: 26 × 24-pounder guns; 14 × 6-pounder guns

Venus was a Swedish frigate, designed by Fredrik Henrik af Chapman. Venus was captured by the Russians in 1789 in Oslofjord. The frigate retained the same name in Imperial Russian service until 1807, when she was sold to the Kingdom of Naples.

== Design ==
The Swedish Bellona class were the first 'super-heavy frigates' in the world, armed with 24-pounder long guns, with the lead ship being built in 1782. Due to the tactical needs in the Baltic and North sea coastlines where maneuverability and shallow draft sometimes could eclipse more gundecks, the Swedes wanted these frigates, the 10 ships of the Bellona class, to be able to challenge a ship of the line, and fill in the battle line in emergency or when favored by the tactical situation.

== Service history ==
Venus was launched on 13 July 1783 in Karlskrona. In 1786 she sailed to Gothenburg where she was to be subordinated by the local naval station, which was commanded by Adolf Ulrik Sheldon. Three years later, on 1 June 1789, while she was under the command of Major Magnus Hansson, and belonged to the Gothenburg Squadron, she was captured by the Russians in a complicated action that created an interesting legal and diplomatic aftermath.

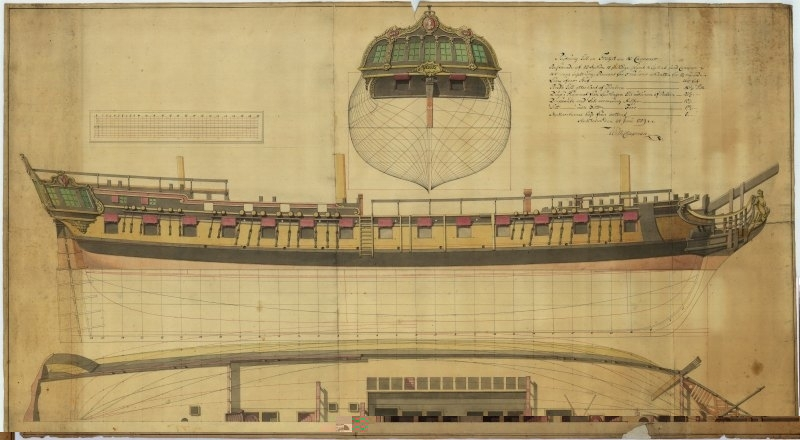
Swedish frigate 'Venus, a schematic dated to 1789

=== Capture by the Imperial Russian Navy ===
On 1 June 1789, Venus was patrolling the waters outside the Norwegian coast. Norway at this time was ruled by Denmark and considered neutral. On 31 May, the lookouts reported a Russian squadron of four frigates and a cutter, the report was soon corrected to two ships of the line, two frigates and a cutter.

Relying on his ships excellent sailing abilities, Commander Hansson expected to be able to stay ahead of the Russian ships, until a change in the wind suddenly deprived him of the possibility of reaching the open sea. Cornered by the Russians, the ship escaped into the entrance of the fjord of Christiania (now Oslo), expecting the protection of a neutral nation. However, the Russian ships followed and went into action, the cutter Merkuriy was the first to reach Venus and both ships opened fire. The larger ships then followed, positioning themselves to be able to fire along the length of Venus.

Hansson had prepared his ship with a spring on the anchor cable to enable to train his ship's broadside guns over a wide arc, and initially he managed to damage the first-arriving Russian ships. However, when the capital ships were in place and also opened fire, Commander Hansson, after consultation with his senior officers, concluded that nothing more could be achieved by further bloodshed and hauled down his colours. According to a testimony from the Danish/Norwegian pilot, Commander Hansson, right after hauling down his flag, boarded the Russian flagship claiming the attack as a crime of war.

The hard feelings among Swedish officers was also obvious in other official reports. The squadron commander A.F. Rosensvärd mentioned in his official report about the loss of Venus that his ships had respected the neutrality versus Russian ships in Danish harbours, "...ships that I with my superiour force easily could have captured if it had been within legal practice...".

The Russian newspapers and authorities made the outmost of the capture, spreading the news that Venus had hauled down her colours to the 22-gun cutter Merkuriy. The imprisoned Commander Hansson reacted furiously claiming his honour as officer had been questioned and wrote a letter to the commander of the Russian squadron asking him as a gentleman to testify about the events.

Commander Jenkins of the cutter Merkuriy answered the call from his enemy colleague. In a letter that can still be found of the Swedish court protocols he not only confirmed that Commander Hansson did actually haul down his flag to the squadron, but also claimed his ship suffered severe damages and would have been sunk if the larger ships had not come to his assistance.

Upon returning from captivity, Commander Major Hansson was placed on trial at the royal court in Stockholm in July 1791 for the loss of his ship. The relatively mild sentence of loss of a half-year salary for positioning his majesty’s frigate Venus into a position where he could not escape to the open sea indicated that the court did not consider the loss itself as a crime and accepted the fact that Major Hansson should have been able to expect a safe haven on neutral waters, and that his defence of the ship had been sufficient until the point of the arrival of the full Russian squadron.

=== Service with Russia and Naples ===
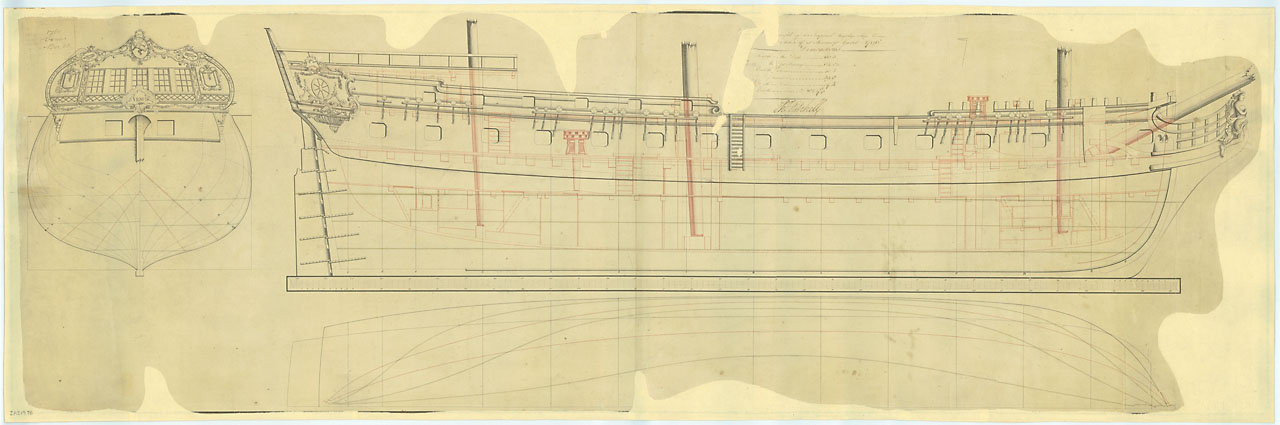
As drawn at Sheerness Dockyard in 1799

The ship was taken over by the Russian Navy and participated in the battle of Reval and in the battle of Vyborg Bay in 1790 under the command of the Scottish-born Russian Admiral Roman (Robert) Crown. Venus visited Holland in 1795 and Great Britain in 1795–1797 and 1799–1800.

The British took the opportunity of making drawings of her at Sheerness Dockyard in 1799, she was carrying 46 guns at that time.

She served in the Adriatic Sea between 1805 and 1807 and in the Aegean Sea in 1807. She was sold to the Kingdom of Naples in Palermo to avoid capture by the British.

== Sources ==
- Court protocol Stockholm royal court June, 1791, regarding the loss of HM Frigate Venus. (Protocoller hållne uti Kongl. Maj:ts Krigs-Hof-Rätt i Stockholm, 1791
- Gardiner, Robert & Lavery, Brian (Editors) (1992) The Line of Battle: The Sailing Warship 1650-1840, Conway Maritime Press, London.
- Quote: A.F. Rosensvärd, official report Wikö fiord den 12 Juni, from HM Frigate Bellona
- Treadea, John; Sozaev, Eduard (2010). Russian Warships in the Age of Sail, 1696–1860: Design, Construction, Careers and Fates. Barnsley, UK: Seaforth Publishing. ISBN 978-1-84832-058-1.
