= Russo-Swedish War (1788–1790) =

Conflict between the Russian Empire and Kingdom of Sweden

Russo-Swedish War of 1788–1790
- Part of the Russo-Swedish Wars
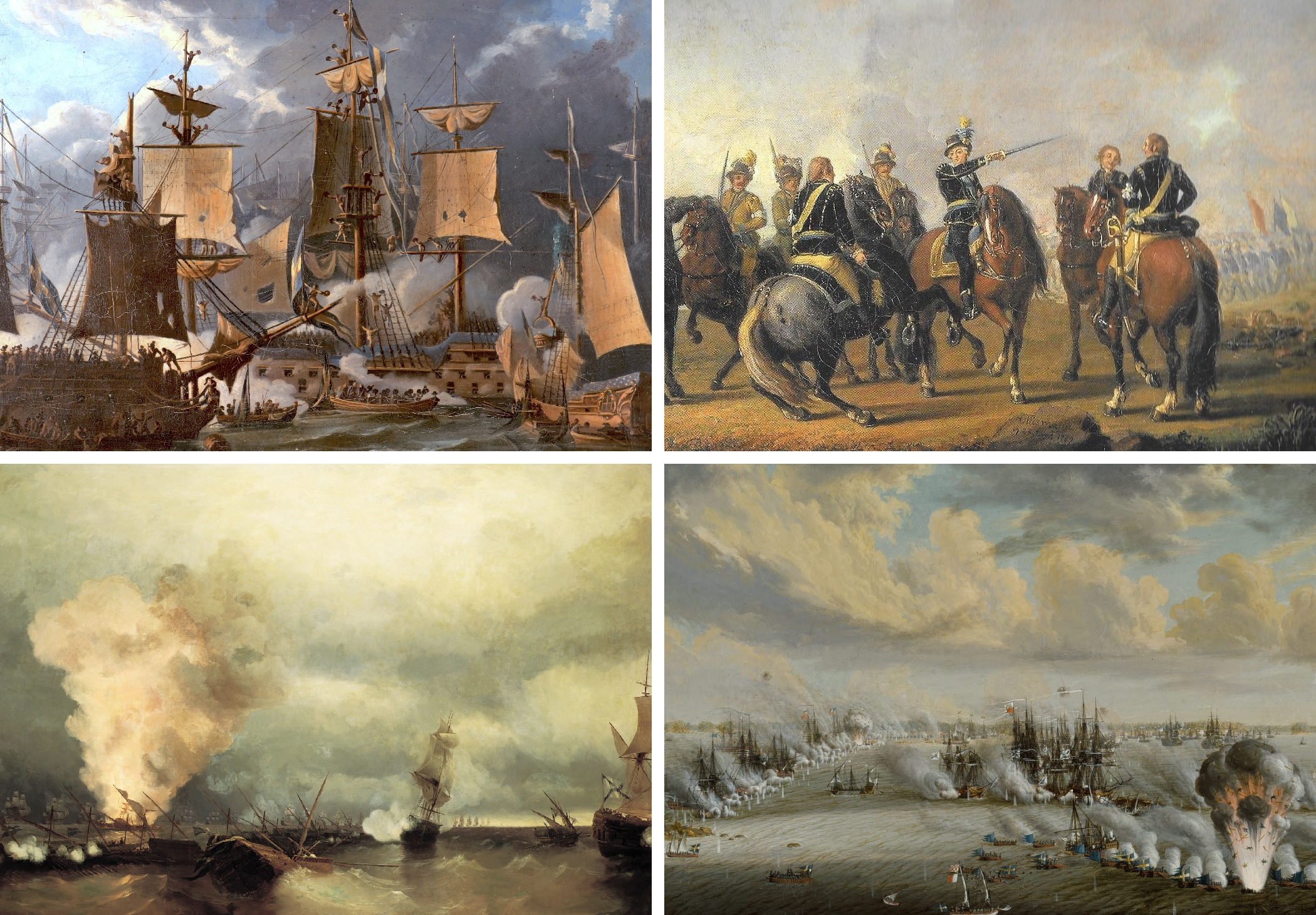
- From left to right: Battle of Hogland; Battle of Uttismalm; Battle of Vyborg Bay; Battle of Svensksund
Date	June 1788 – 14 August 1790
Location	Baltic Sea; Sweden; Russia
Result	See aftermath Full results: Treaty of Värälä; Favourable outcome for Sweden; Russia's right to interfere with Swedish interior affairs from the Treaty of Nystad expressly revoked.; Russian failure to politically subjugate Sweden.; Catherine the Great de-facto recognizes Gustav III's regime and his constitution; The provisions of the previous Treaty of Åbo were De Facto confirmed.; A convention was signed in Stockholm, whereby the countries pledged to assist each other in case of foreign attack; Sweden was allowed to bring out 50,000 rubles worth of grain out of Russian harbors without additional export fees
Territorial changes	Status quo ante bellum: All conquests made by both sides are returned

Belligerents
Russian Empire; Denmark–Norway (Theatre War 1788–1789)	Sweden

Commanders and leaders
Catherine II; Valentin Musin-Pushkin; Ivan Saltykov; Georg Sprengtporten (WIA); Ivan Mikhelson; Iosif Igelström; Fyodor Denisov; James Trevenen †; Victor Amadeus †; Karl von Nassau-Siegen; Vasily Chichagov; Pyotr Slizov; James Trevenen; Samuel Greig; Ivan Balle; Count Yuly Litta; Admiral Alexander Kruse; Robert Crown; (Denmark–Norway) Christian VII; Prince Charles of Hesse-Kassel; Johann Friedrich Mansbach	Gustav III; Prince Charles; Johan Meijerfeldt; Curt von Stedingk; Gustaf Wachtmeister; Gustaf Armfelt; Lars von Kaulbars; Jakob Gripenberg; Rudolf Cederström; Carl Olof Cronstedt; Vilhelm Mauritz Pauli; Carl Ehrensvärd; Salomon von Rajalin; Enrique MacDonell; Klas Hjelmstierna; Sidney Smith

Strength
23,000 – 38,720	38,000

Casualties and losses
2,640–10,000 killed or wounded 6,000 captured many ships sunk, destroyed or captured	3,000 killed or wounded 4,500 captured

The Russo-Swedish War of 1788–1790 (Note: Known as Gustav III's Russian War in Sweden, Gustav III's War in Finland and Catherine II's Swedish War in Russia.) was fought between Sweden and Russia from June 1788 to August 1790. The war was ended by the Treaty of Värälä on 14 August 1790 and took place concomitantly with both the Austro-Turkish War (1788–1791), Russo-Turkish War (1787–1792) and Theatre War. The war was, overall, mostly insignificant for the parties involved.

King Gustav III of Sweden initiated the war for domestic political reasons, hoping to gain support from the opposition. Despite forming an alliance with the Ottoman Empire, Sweden failed to secure support from Great Britain, the Dutch Republic, and Prussia. Sweden's initial plan to attack Saint Petersburg and instigate a coup to depose Empress Catherine II did not materialize. The war led to Denmark–Norway declaring war on Sweden, but peace was eventually signed on 9 July 1789 after diplomatic intervention by Great Britain and Prussia.

During the Russo-Swedish War of 1788–1790, Sweden attempted to prevent Russian ships from cutting off coastal sea routes by building fortifications at Hangö and on its surrounding islands. Both Swedish and Russian navies engaged in multiple indecisive battles throughout the conflict, such as the Battle of Öland and the First and Second Battle of Svensksund. The latter naval battle was the biggest success of the Swedes in this war, whereas the greatest Russian success at sea was the Battle of Reval. The war on land was marked by numerous skirmishes and shifting front lines but ultimately remained a stalemate. King Gustav III of Sweden, realizing the difficulty of defeating Russia and facing mounting war expenses, sought peace. Empress Catherine II of Russia, distracted by other conflicts and concerns, also desired peace. Overall, the war did not provide any lasting solutions to their respective domestic issues.

== Background ==
The conflict was initiated by King Gustav III of Sweden for domestic political reasons, as he believed that a short war would leave the opposition with no recourse but to support him. Despite establishing himself as an autocrat in a bloodless coup d'état that ended parliamentary rule in 1772, his political powers did not give him the right to start a war. He was also becoming increasingly unpopular, an issue which became obvious during the parliament session of 1786. This unpopularity was also encouraged by Russia, which believed an autocratic king to be a threat to its interests. However, Russian support for his opposition did not go unnoticed by Gustav III, and was one of the reasons why he thought of the war as inevitable. The Western powers — such as Great Britain, the Dutch Republic and the Kingdom of Prussia — were alarmed by a string of Russian victories in the Russo-Turkish War (1787–1792) and lobbied for the war in the north, which would have diverted the attention of Catherine II of Russia from the Southern theatre. It was at their instigation that Gustav concluded an alliance with the Ottoman Empire in the summer of 1788. However, only the Ottoman Empire was willing to ally with Sweden while Great Britain, the Dutch Republic, and Prussia rejected efforts to form an alliance.

Before the grand opening of the Riksdag in 1789, King Gustav III had the Riksdag Music commissioned. The Parliament then decided on the creation of a National Debt Office to raise funds and finance the war, a move that gave rise to a wave of inflation of the Swedish riksdaler.

== Preparations for the war ==
The Swedes initially planned a naval assault on Saint Petersburg. One Swedish army was to advance through Finland; a second army, accompanied by the Swedish coastal flotilla, was to advance along the Finnish coast into the Gulf of Finland; while a third army sailed with the Swedish battlefleet in order to land at Oranienbaum to advance on Saint Petersburg. The goal was to instigate a coup de état in Russia and depose Empress Catherine II. Sveaborg was set as the forward base of operations for the campaign. However, the whole concept was based on the assumption that the Swedish open sea fleet would be able to decisively defeat its Russian counterpart. Incidentally, Russian forces were not totally unprepared for the war since the bulk of the Russian Baltic Fleet was planned to be transferred against the Ottoman Empire and had made preparations of its own for war.

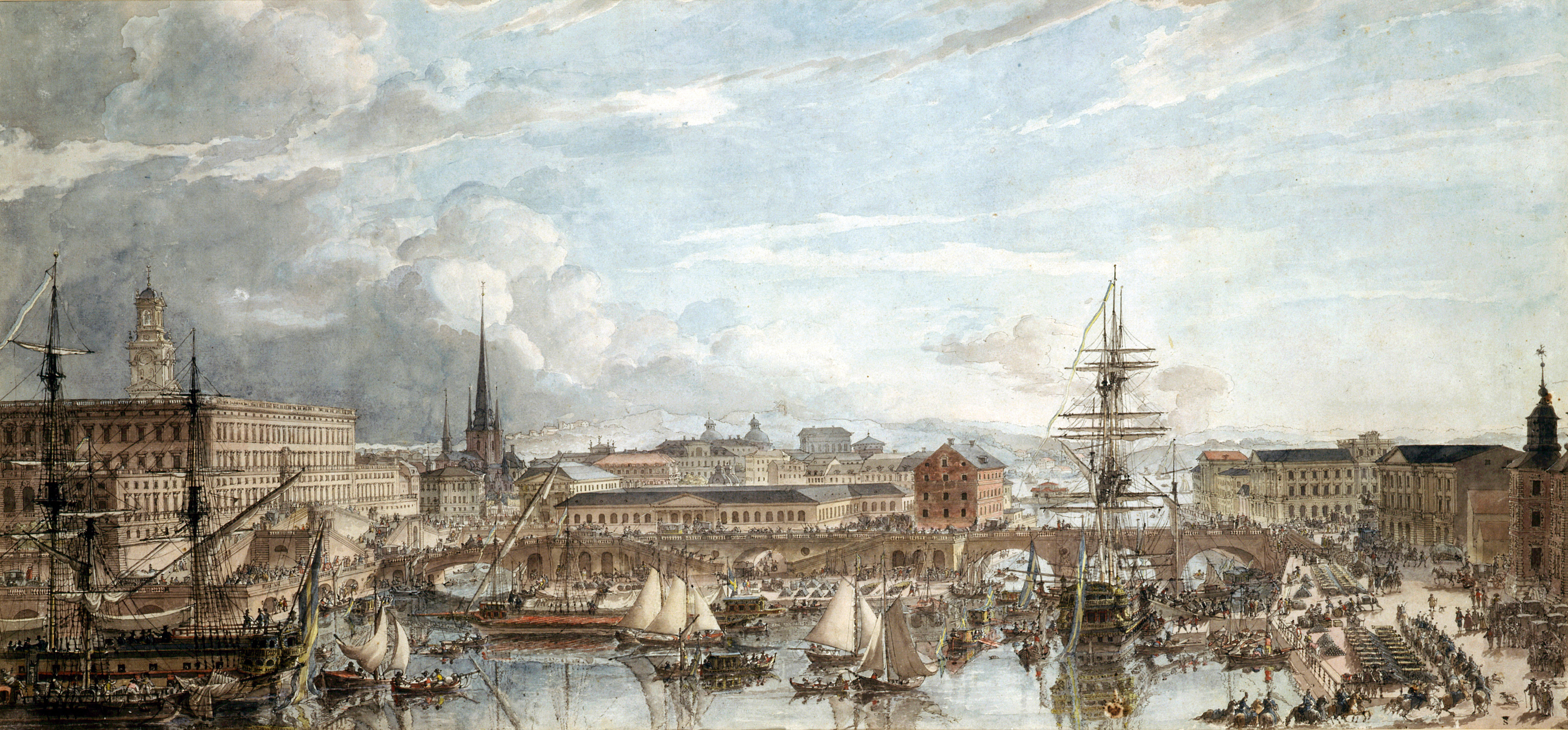
Swedish warships fitted out in Stockholm in 1788; watercolor by Louis Jean Desprez

War was far from popular, even less so in the eastern part of Sweden (Finland). Even senior military leaders voiced their opposition to the plans to go to war. Especially amongst the officers of the army, unrest spread widely. This could partly be explained by the still remaining supporters of Georg Magnus Sprengtporten's plans for Finnish independence.

In 1788, a head tailor of the Royal Swedish Opera received an order to sew a number of Russian military uniforms that later were used in an exchange of gunfire at Puumala, a Swedish outpost on the Russo-Swedish border, on 27 June 1788. The staged attack, which caused outrage in Stockholm, was to convince the Riksdag of the Estates and to provide Gustav with an excuse to declare a "defensive war" on Russia. This was important since Gustav III did not have the constitutional right to start an offensive war without the agreement of the estates, who had already made clear that their acceptance would not be forthcoming.

== War ==
=== 1788 ===
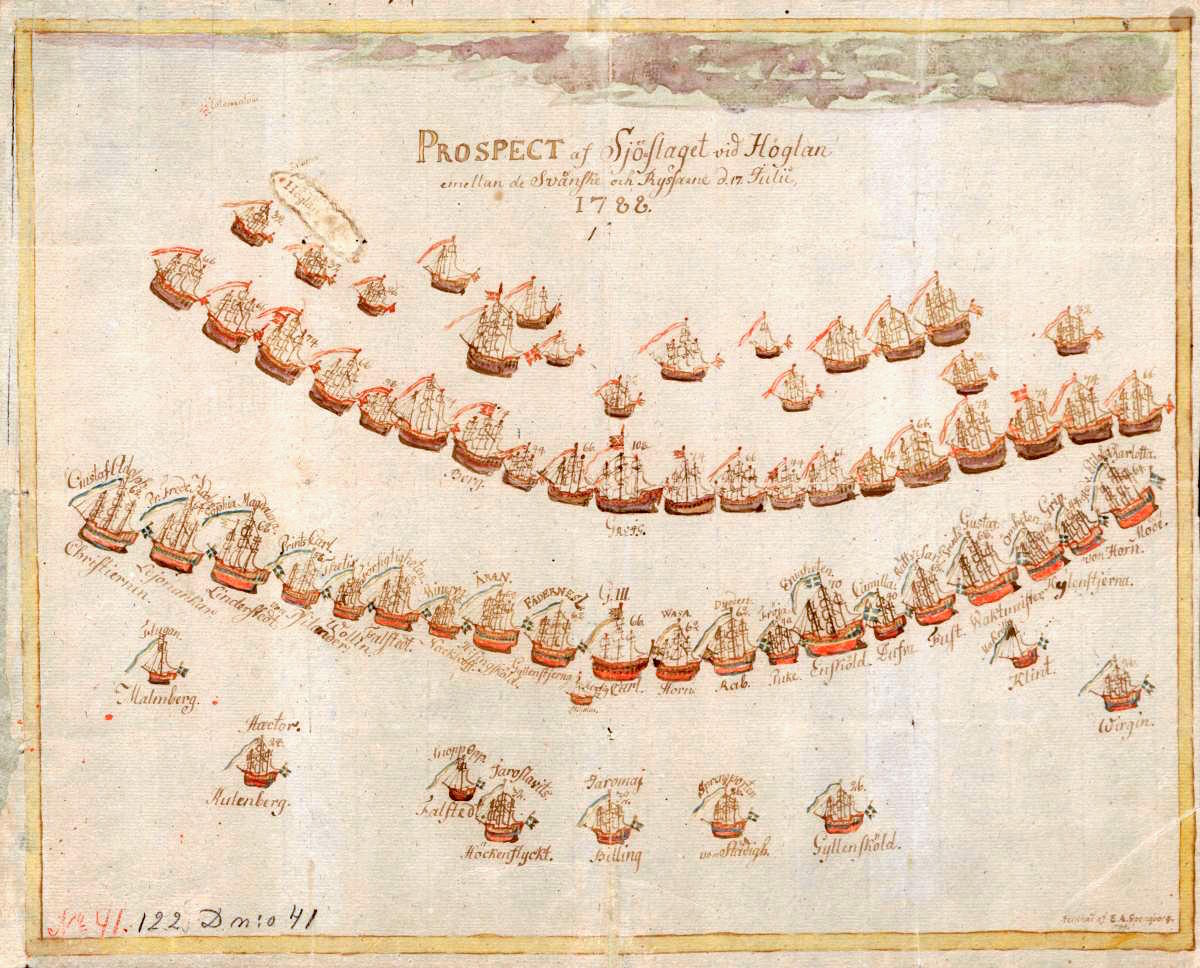
Contemporary Swedish drawing of the order of battle at the Battle of Hogland in 1788

The Swedish open sea fleet sailed from Karlskrona on 9 June 1788, with Duke Charles of Södermanland as its commander. On 21 June the fleet met a Russian squadron off Saaremaa island and after chasing the Russians down tried to provoke a conflict by demanding Russians render honours to the Swedes from which Russians had been exempted in the previous peace treaties. Vice Admiral Wilhelm von Dessin who commanded the small Russian squadron agreed to render honours to Duke Charles but not to the Swedish flag and managed to dissolve the threatening situation and continue towards Copenhagen. Since the Swedish wanted to avoid initiating the conflict they had lost their chance to provoke the Russians into war and were left empty-handed.

On 7 July the Swedish fleet was notified that a state of war with Russia was in effect, and already on 8 July surprised two unprepared Russian frigates – 32-gun Jaroslavets (Jarislawits) and 24-gun Hektor (Gektor) – which were promptly captured together with their crew of 450 men. The Swedish fleet met a Russian fleet sailing under the command of Admiral Samuel Greig and fought an engagement, the Battle of Hogland, in which neither side managed to gain advantage. Upon return to Sveaborg to repair and resupply Duke Charles' fleet, the Swedes found that Sveaborg had been stocked only with coastal fleet in mind, which amongst other things meant that it did not store ammunition for the heavy cannons of the open sea fleet and lacked suitable stocks of equipment required to repair large sailing ships.

The coastal fleet's Stockholm's squadron departed for Finland on 25 June, carrying over 9,000 troops. It reached its destination of Sveaborg on 2 July and started constructing an encampment on the island of Sandhamn (Santahamina), next to Helsingfors (Helsinki). The coastal fleet's Sveaborg squadron under Colonel Michael Anckarsvärd had been readied for action already by mid-June. On 26 July, the coastal fleet under Colonel Anckarsvärd departed for Frederikshamn (Hamina), carrying 6,000 men, while a 4,000-strong unit advanced on land under General Gustaf Mauritz Armfelt. The Swedish coastal fleet clashed briefly with a group of Russian galleys outside Frederikshamn on 28 July, and forced them to retire within the protection of the fortifications. Initial Swedish landing attempts began on 2 August but bad weather prevented the main force from landing and a Russian counterattack forced the 300-man Swedish landing party to return to their ships. On 3 August, landings were successful, some 10 km south-east of the town, and by the evening Swedish forces were advancing towards Frederikshamn. However, inspired Russian resistance in the early hours of 4 August convinced the Swedish landing force to return to its ships. Attempts to swiftly capture Frederikshamn ended in total failure for several reasons, one of the most glaring being the increasing unrest against the king amongst the officers.

Attempts by Colonel Berndt Johan Hastfer's 1,700-man-strong Savolax Brigade to storm Nyslott (Savonlinna) by surprise on 2 July ended in a siege which, given the besiegers' total lack of siege artillery, caused the Swedish advance to bog down. The siege had to be abandoned on 21 August. General Carl Gustaf Armfeldt the Younger's 4,000 men were to support the coastal fleet's capture of Frederikshamn and crossed the border on 18 July, reaching its staging ground just north of Frederikshamn on 20 July. A further 1,100 men were under the command of Colonel Gustaf Mauritz Armfelt. When the failure at Frederikshamn became apparent, the Swedish troops were pulled back to the border. The war being perceived illegal as it did not have the support of the estates, along with its lack of success, contributed to rising unrest. Already on 9 August, a group of officers had pleaded for peace with Russia, and on 12 August had signed what became known as the Anjala declaration, with the whole matter being later known as the Anjala conspiracy. King Gustav III's position, surrounded by rebellious officers, was greatly improved when news of a threat of war from Denmark–Norway became known and he could head back to Sweden on 25 August without being accused of deserting his troops.

The Swedish attack on Russia caused Denmark–Norway to declare war on Sweden in August, in accordance with its treaty obligations to Russia. A Norwegian army briefly invaded Sweden and won the Battle of Kvistrum Bridge, before peace was signed on 9 July 1789, following the diplomatic intervention of Great Britain and Prussia. Under their pressure, Denmark–Norway declared itself neutral in the conflict, bringing the Theatre War to an end.

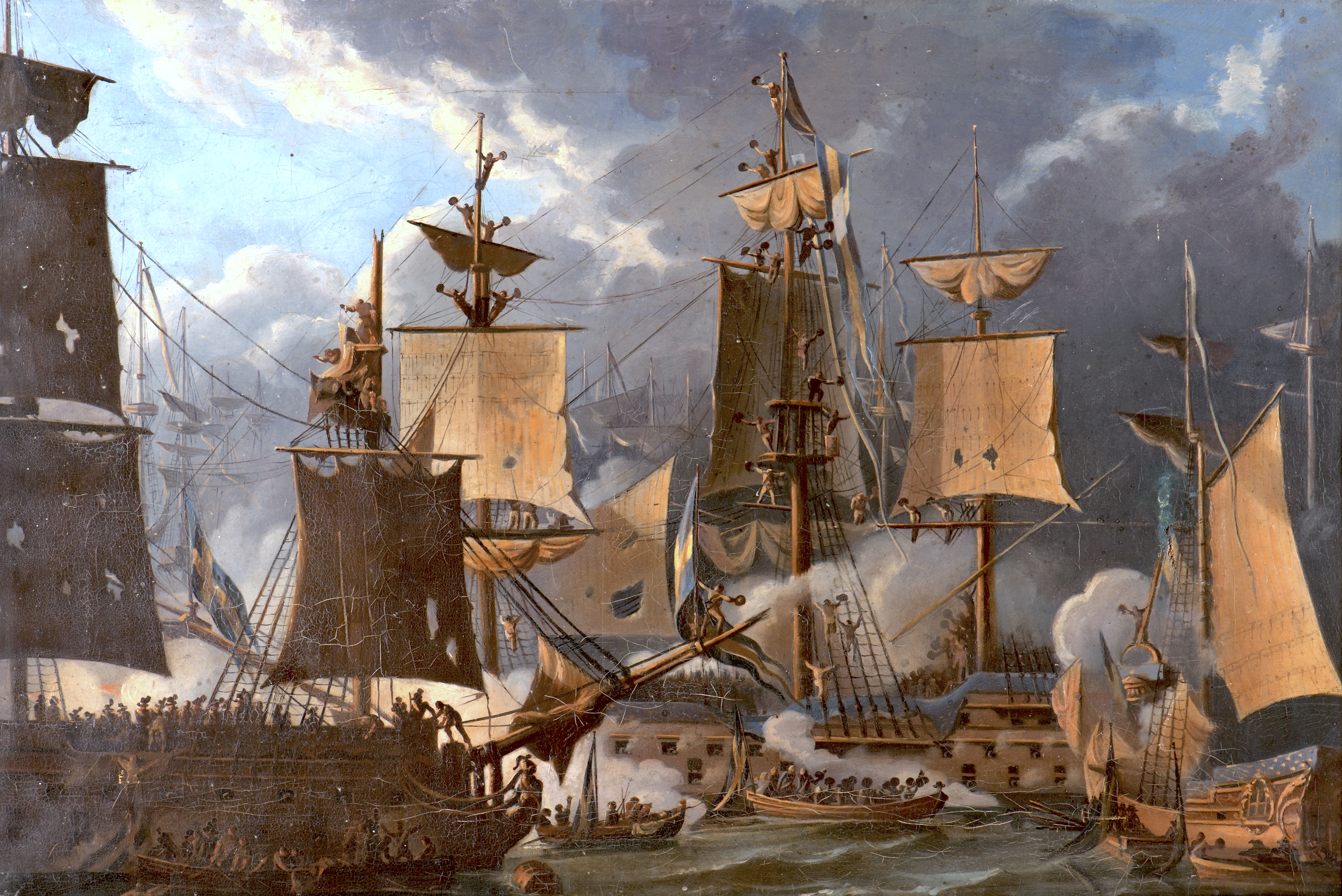
The Battle of Hogland in 1788

The Russian fleet had already in early August, soon after the Battle of Hogland, moved to blockade the Swedish open sea fleet in Sveaborg, as the Swedes were unable to get their fleet ready for battle. A small detachment, under command of James Travene, from the Russian fleet cut the safe coastal sea route past Hangö (Hanko) in late August 1788. This caused severe supply troubles for the Swedish fleets and armies, which were mostly east of the cape. A small coastal fleet detachment under Lieutenant-Colonel Victor von Stedingk sortied to drive off the Russians, but lacked the strength to do so. After receiving reinforcements, the Swedes managed on 17 October to engage large Russian units for long enough for the small gunboats to slip past the blockade and protect the transports west of the cape, which probably saved the transports containing army and fleet supplies from capture. A few days later, the Russians abandoned their position, allowing Swedish transports to deliver supplies unhindered. Since Sveaborg could not repair and refit the ships of the open sea fleet, it had to set sail for Karlskrona. However, preparations and unsuitable weather delayed departure until 20 November, when the sea at Sveaborg was already frozen over and some ships had to be freed by sawing the ice open for them. The fleet, however, reached Karlskrona one week later without any losses, just days before that port also froze over.

=== 1789 ===
In an attempt to prevent Russian ships from cutting off coastal sea routes, the Swedes built several fortifications at Hangö and on its surrounding islands during the winter of 1788/1789. Additional fortifications were constructed west of Hangö, near Korpo. However, Porkala cape was left without fortifications. The bulk of the Swedish army in Finland, consisting of 13,000 men under General Johan August Meijerfeldt the Younger, was placed at the Kymmene river, with a further 5,000 men in Savolax. While the troops still lacked supplies, their discipline and morale had been greatly improved from what it had been in 1788. On the naval front, Sweden had not been so lucky; the crews of the open sea fleet based at Karlskrona suffered heavily from fever, making both fitting and manning the ships very difficult, and it took until 6 July before the fleet was able to set sail, under command of Duke Charles of Södermanland, who had the experienced naval officer Admiral Otto Henrik Nordenskjöld as his flag-captain.

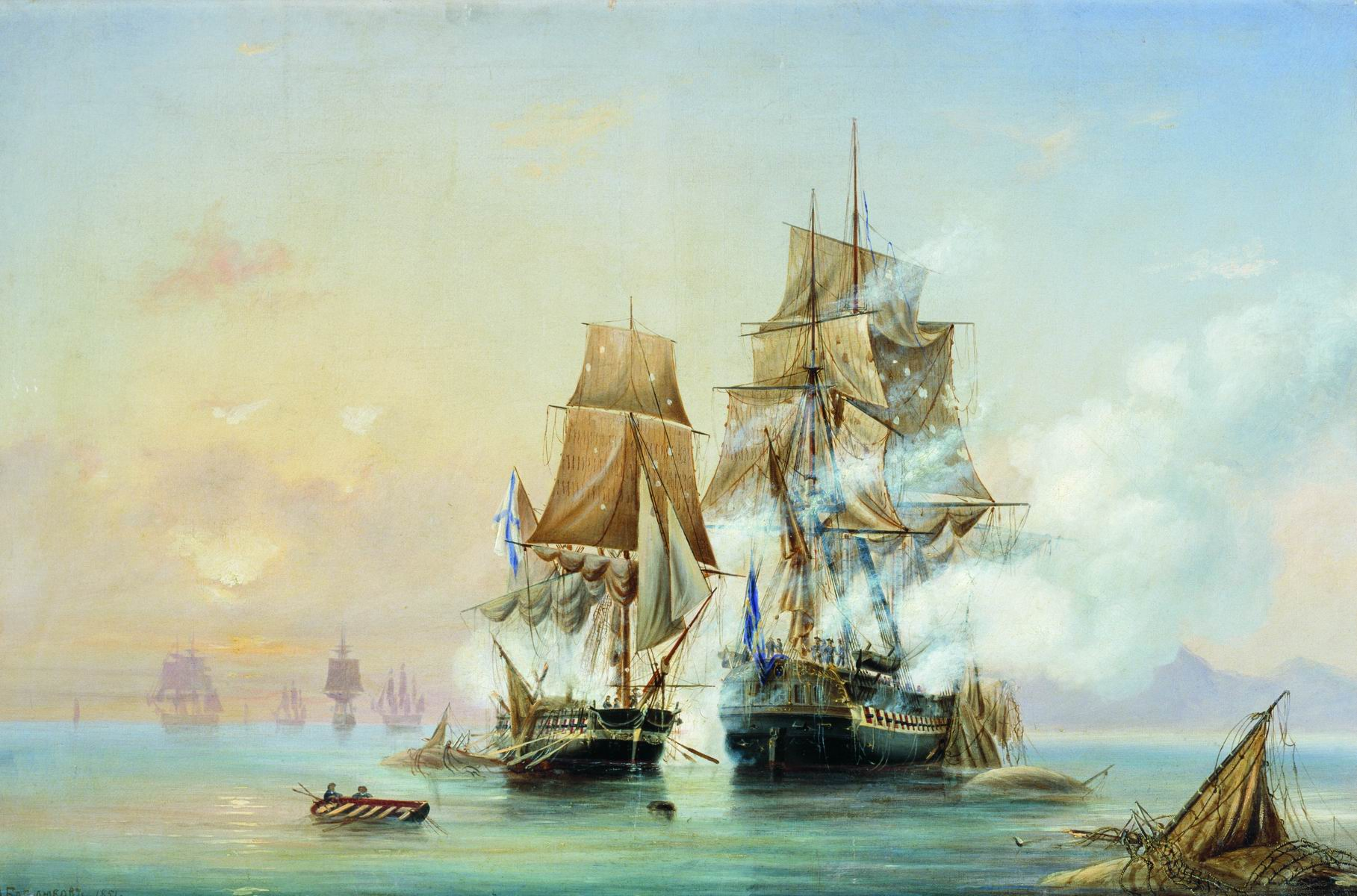
Capturing of Swedish 44-gun frigate Venus by Russian 22-gun cutter Merkuriy on June 1, 1789. Captain of Merkuriy was Robert Crown. (painted by Alexey Bogolyubov, 1845)

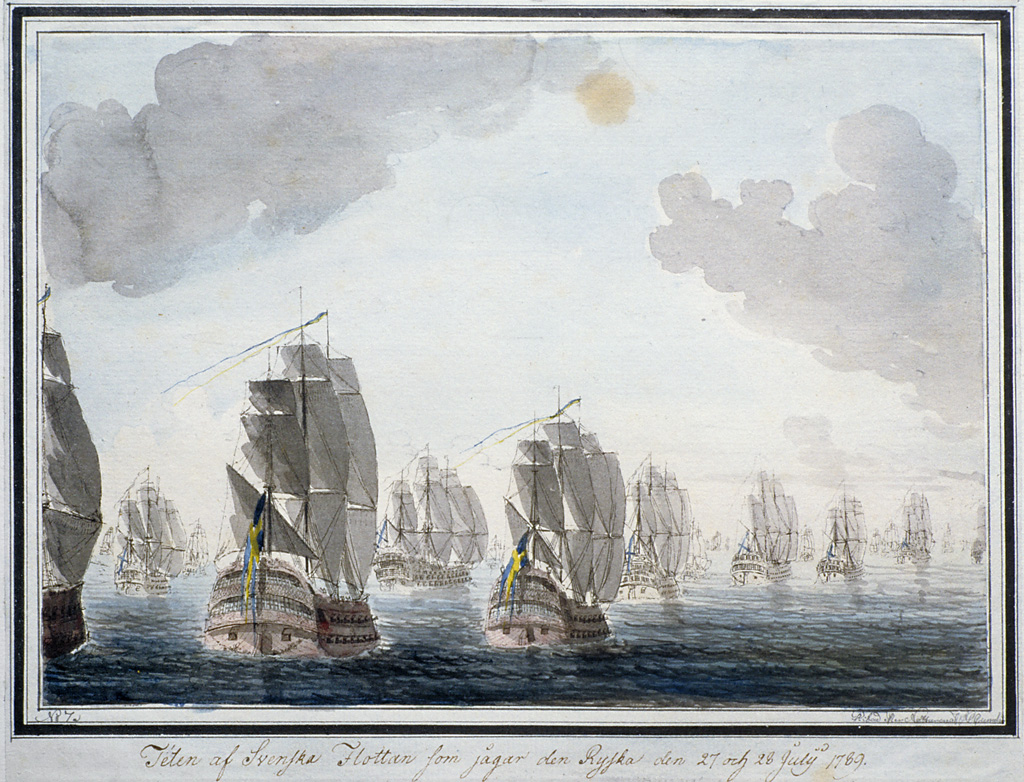
Swedish and Russian navies during a battle in July 1789, Öland

In stark contrast to Swedish troubles, the Russian open sea fleet had set sail already in mid-May; by 22 May a few ships reconnoitered the Swedish defences at Hangö, but after a short engagement the Russian ships chose to break off. The main body of the Russian fleet under Admiral Vasily Chichagov met the Swedish fleet on 26 July, and engaged it in what became known as the Battle of Öland. As in the previous year, the battle was indecisive, with the Swedes heading to Karlskrona and the Russian fleet joining up with a Russian squadron from Danish waters. The raging epidemic then confined the Swedish fleet to Karlskrona for most of the year.

The Swedish coastal fleet had been unable to sail for Sweden for the winter and had to be fitted out in Finland. In addition to the problems, the commander of the coastal fleet Colonel Anckarsvärd was arrested for being involved with the Anjala conspiracy and replaced with Admiral Carl August Ehrensvärd. The Swedish coastal fleet was able to sail from Sveaborg in late May and moved to the vicinity of Frederikshamn. However, after Hangö had been fortified, the Russians had moved in to blockade the coastal sea route at Porkala on 10 June. This effectively split the Swedish coastal fleet, as reinforcements from Sweden were unable to join with the main body, putting the coastal fleet at a severe disadvantage against the Russian coastal fleet.

In mid-June 1789, the Russians attacked Savolax from three different directions, with total forces of roughly 10,000 men against 4,000 Swedish defenders. Despite a clear victory at the Battle of Porrassalmi, the Swedish army was forced to withdraw, leaving the important Puumala straits to the Russians. Meanwhile, King Gustav III had assumed control of the main body of the Swedish army and started an offensive towards Villmanstrand on 25 June. The Swedes won a resounding victory at Utti on 28 June, but instead of advancing to Villmanstrand, the king headed for Frederikshamn. Once again, however, the Swedish offensive was bogged down. It took until 18 July for Russian defences outside Frederikshamn to be cleared, and during this time the Russian army had kept moving its forces south from Savolax. Small detachments (roughly 2,000 men) sent to stop the Russians were defeated at Kaipiainen and the Swedish army had to withdraw to the border once again.

The Russian departure from Savolax enabled Swedish units in the area under the command of Colonel Curt von Stedingk to go onto the offensive. His forces advanced towards Nyslott and won several engagements against the Russians, first at Parkuinmäki Hill and later at Laitaatsilta. When forces moved to their winter encampments, very little had changed from the spring, with the Savolax Brigade having recaptured lost land, and only Puumala had remaining in Russian control.

The Russian coastal fleet under Karl Heinrich von Nassau-Siegen started attacking the Swedish coastal fleet on 15 August, by driving away the Swedish squadron which was scouting the area near Frederikshamn. This was followed by an attack against the main staging ground of the Swedish coastal fleet at Svensksund, leading to the first Battle of Svensksund. The Russians tried to take advantage of their victory over the Swedes with a co-ordinated offensive of both the coastal fleet and the army, which managed to drive the remaining Swedes beyond the Kymmene river. The battered Swedish coastal fleet was soon reinforced with ships from Sveaborg, while its commander Admiral Carl August Ehrensvärd was replaced, first by Colonel Carl Nathanael af Klercker, who oversaw the repairs, and later by Lieutenant-Colonel Georg Christian de Frese.

The Russian blockade caused considerable trouble to the Swedes. Starting already in early July, Swedish gunboats engaged the much larger Russians on a daily basis, under the command of Admiral Salomon von Rajalin, who was in overall command of the Swedish coastal fleet in the Porkala region. Since von Rajalin's forces lacked the strength to overpower the Russian blockade, they instead covered the Swedish transports in their passage through the Barösund strait. The Swedish forces were repeatedly reinforced during the summer and already in mid-July consisted of 2 frigates, 10 galleys and several gunboats. Several artillery batteries were constructed to protect the area. Fighting at sea near Porkala cape continued until September. The Russian blockade at Porkala was after 24 August 1789 under the command of Captain James Trevenen, who started the effort to break the Swedish hold on Barösund. The Russian attack against Barösund started on 18 September. The attacking force consisted of 4 ships of the line, 1 frigate and 6 cutters. Fighting continued for two hours and cost the Swedes a single galley and the Russians one ship of the line (Severny Oryol) and several others damaged, but it gained the Russians the control of the Barösund strait. Sporadic fighting in the archipelago near Porkala continued and on 23 September the Russians captured the island of Älgsjön from the Swedes, but lost it on 30 September when Swedish reinforcements under Colonel Gustaf Mauritz Armfelt arrived. The Russian fleet left the area suddenly on 23 October, possibly due to the news that the Swedish open sea fleet had set sail, which it had done on 13 October, only to return to Karlskrona on 22 October. The Russian departure opened the safe coastal sea route to Swedish transports.

=== 1790 ===
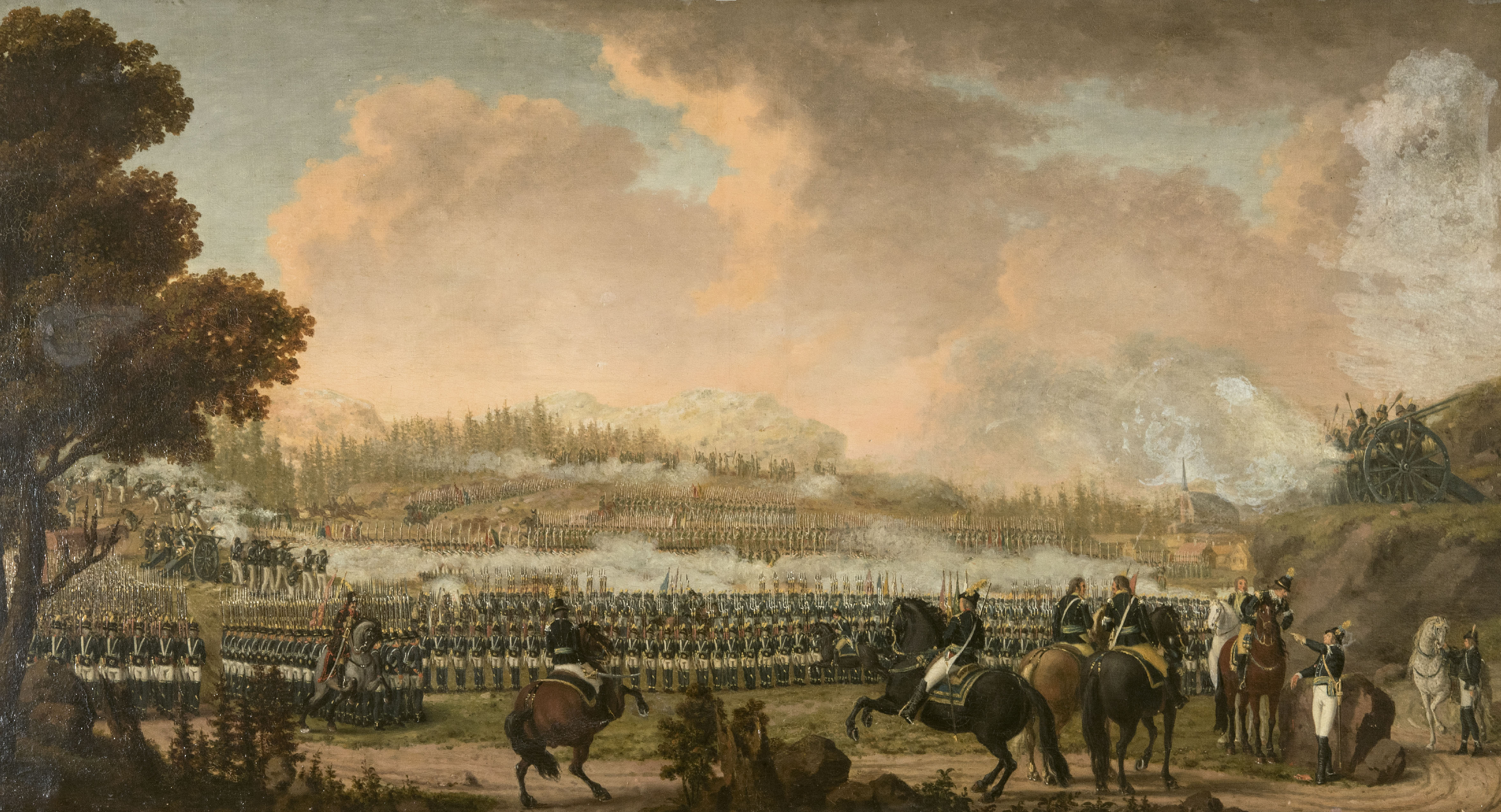
The Battle of Valkeala in 1790

In 1790, King Gustav III revived the plan for a landing close to Saint Petersburg, this time near Vyborg. In addition, a determined effort was made to bolster the strength of the fleets as much as possible so as to be able to get them under sail as soon as possible. The coastal fleet especially was being reinforced with new and stronger ships, some of them donated by the various Swedish towns. The first action took place on 17 March 1790, when two Swedish frigates plundered the Russian-controlled port of Rågersvik (Baltiyskiy Port). Swedish squadrons from Stockholm started towards Sveaborg on 21 April and also from Pommern on 3 May. Even though the Swedish main effort was on the sea, they attacked also on land, where Swedes led by Colonel Gustaf Mauritz Armfelt defeated Russian defenders on 15 April in southern Savolax, while the army led by King Gustav III and Colonel Gustaf Wachtmeister won another victory in the Battle of Valkeala. A Russian attack on 5 May close to the Kymmene river gained some success, capturing Anjala, but was thrown back before the end of the month. Fighting on land, however, reached stalemate, and already in June had turned into static warfare.

The Swedish open sea fleet under Duke Charles arrived on 10 May at Hangö and moved on 12 May to the vicinity of Reval. As some ships of the fleet were still separated from the main body, Duke Charles refused to carry out the attack on 12 May, when favourable winds still existed, and instead chose to attack on 13 May, leading to the Swedish failure at the Battle of Reval. The Swedish fleet stayed near Reval until late May, when it set sail to protect the flank of the coastal fleet; this led to another naval engagement, at the Battle of Kronstadt. Failing to inflict a decisive defeat on the Russians, or to prevent separate Russian squadrons from joining, the open sea fleet sailed to Vyborg Bay.

The coastal fleet started its offensive on 8 May, under command of King Gustav III with de Frese as his flag-captain, without waiting for the coastal fleet's squadrons from Sweden or Pommern. The Swedish coastal fleet attacked the Russian fleet at Frederikshamn on 15 May, winning a clear victory over the defenders in the Battle of Fredrikshamn. However, attempts to capture the town and its fortifications failed. Instead of blockading the town, the Swedes chose to continue further towards Vyborg while raiding Russian supplies along the coast, and reached the Beryozovye Islands on 2 June, from where it attempted to support the open sea fleet in the Battle of Kronstadt.

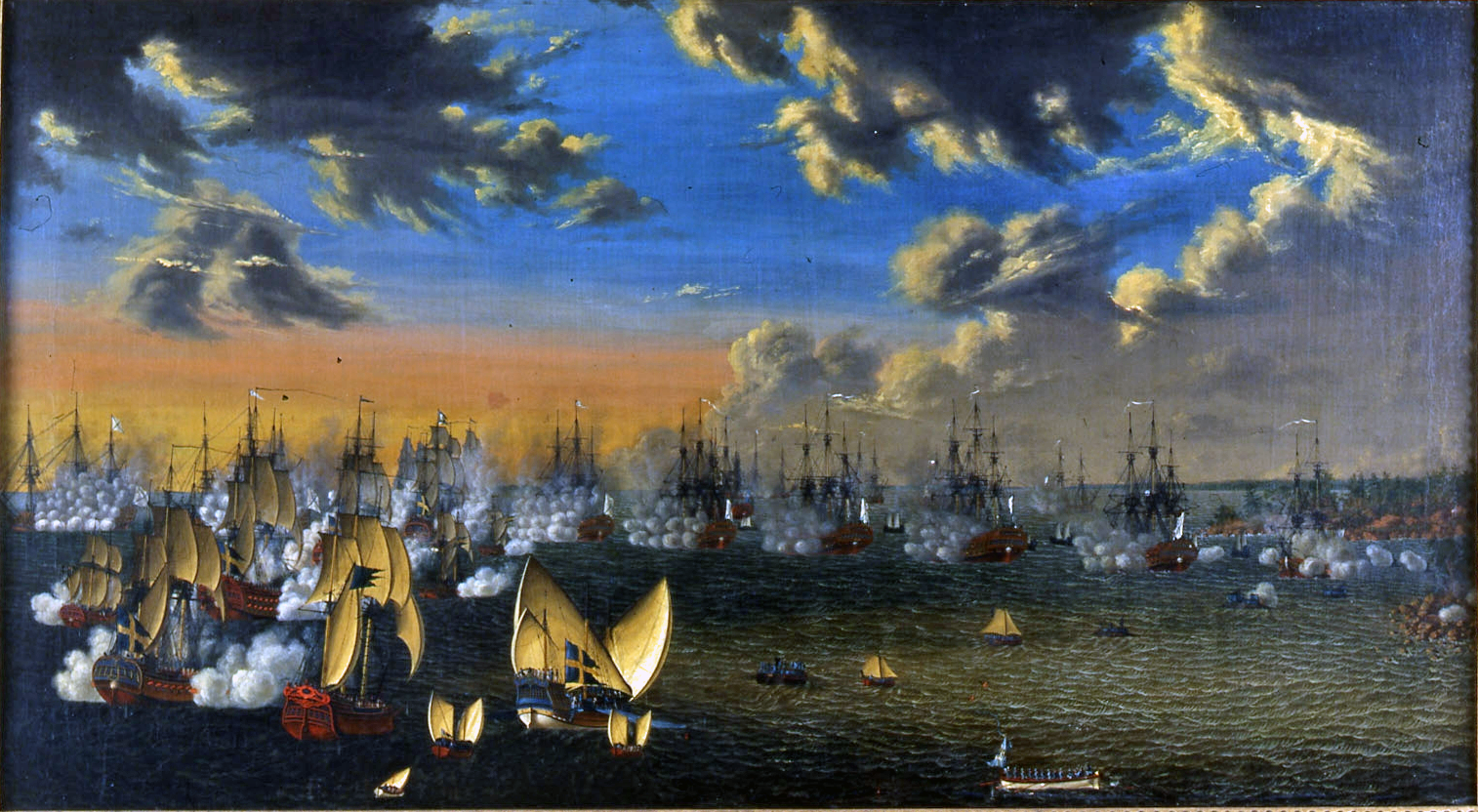
The Battle of Vyborg Bay in 1790

The Russian fleet, under command of Admiral Vasily Chichagov, blockaded the Swedish fleets with their 30,000 men in Vyborg Bay. The blockade continued for a month and on 21–23 June, with supplies running out, the Swedes chose to attempt a breakout as soon as favorable winds would allow it. The Swedish coastal squadron under Lieutenant-Colonel Carl Olof Cronstedt arrived at Svensksund on 19 June and supported the ground forces of General Meijerfeldt in driving away Russian forces from its vicinity. However, Cronstedt's squadron could not get past a Russian frigate detachment under Captain Rowan Crown (orig. Robert Cronin) blocking the coastal sea route near modern-day Virolahti and had to return to Svensksund. The Swedish escape from Vyborg Bay started on 3 July and lost several ships when they ran aground due to bad visibility in the treacherous waters. The Swedish battle fleet retired to Sveaborg for repairs while the Swedish coastal fleet made for a strong defensive position at Svensksund. The Russian coastal fleet, led by Karl Heinrich von Nassau-Siegen started its attack against the Swedes on 9 July 1790, in what became known as the second Battle of Svensksund, which ended in a decisive Swedish victory. And Russia lost more than 10,000 soldiers killed, wounded and captured. And More than 50–80 Russian warships were sunk, destroyed or captured.

Despite recent success, King Gustav III believed that his chances of successfully continuing the war were low. His government was also rapidly suffering from ever-increasing debt caused by the war expenses. On the other hand, Empress Catherine II became convinced that the Swedes would not be easily defeated and was anxious for peace in a war which was not important for her. The Russian Vice-Chancellor Alexander Bezborodko immediately agreed to negotiations, and the war was ended by the Treaty of Värälä on 14 August.

== Aftermath ==
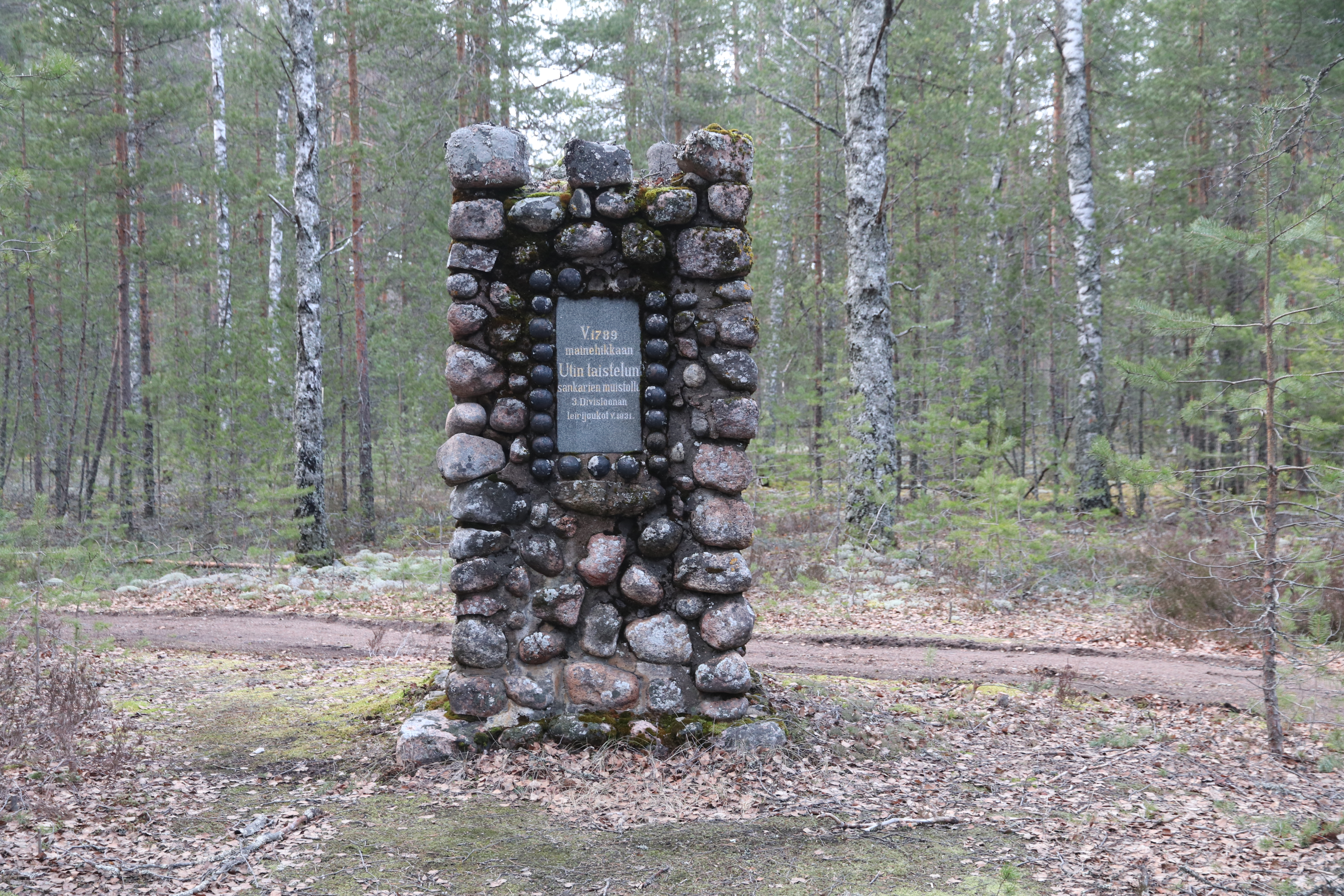
Memorial of the Battle of Uttismalm erected in Utti, Finland (1931)

The Russo-Swedish War of 1788–1790 was, overall, mostly insignificant for the parties involved. Catherine II regarded the war against her Swedish cousin as a substantial distraction, as her land troops were tied up in the war against Turkey, and she was likewise concerned with revolutionary events unfolding in the Polish–Lithuanian Commonwealth (the Constitution of 3 May 1791) and in France (the French Revolution). The Swedish attack foiled the Russian plans of sending its navy into the Mediterranean Sea to support its forces fighting the Ottomans, as it was needed to protect the capital, Saint Petersburg. The war solved Gustav III's domestic problems only briefly, as he was assassinated at the opera in Stockholm, in 1792.

== Bibliography ==
- Brückner, Alexander (1869). The War of Russia with Sweden Война Россіи съ Швеціей въ 1788—1790 годахъ [The War Between Russia and Sweden in 1788–1790] (in Russian). Saint Petersburg: V. Golovin Printing House.
- Егоршина, Петрова (2023). История русской армии [The history of the Russian Army] (in Russian). Moscow: Moskva. ISBN 978-5-699-42397-2.
- Carl Christoffer Ekman; Reinhold Hausen (1900). Dagbok förd under kriget i Finland 1788-1790 / Carl Christopher Ekman ; utgifven af Reinh. Hausen. Skrifter utgivna av Svenska litteratursällskapet i Finland (in Swedish). Helsinki: Society of Swedish Literature in Finland. ISBN 951-583-097-4. Wikidata Q113393919.
- Golovachyov, Viktor (1870). The actions of the Russian fleet during the war between Russia and Sweden in 1788–90 Дѣйствія русскаго флота во время войны Россіи со Швеціей въ 1788–90 годахъ. Кампанія 1788 года [The Actions of the Russian Fleet During the War Between Russia and Sweden in 1788–90. Campaign of 1788] (in Russian). Saint Petersburg: I. I. Glazunov Printing House.
- Johnsson, Raoul (2011). Grönroos, Maria; Karttunen, Ilkka (eds.). Kustaa III ja suuri merisota [Gustaf III and the Great Naval War] (in Finnish). Helsinki: John Nurminen Foundation. ISBN 978-952-9745-31-9.
- Georg Henrik Jägerhorn; Petra Hakala; Pertti Hakala; Lars Ericson Wolke (2004), I fält för Gustaf III : beskrivning över kampanjen i Savolax 1788-1790 / G. H. Jägerhorn ; utgiven av Petra och Pertti Hakala ; kommentarer: Lars Ericson Wolke, Skrifter utgivna av Svenska litteratursällskapet i Finland (in Swedish), Helsinki: Society of Swedish Literature in Finland, Wikidata Q113530005
- Lebedev, Alexey (2015). К походу и бою готовы? Боевые возможности корабельных эскадр русского парусного флота XVIII – середины XIX вв. С точки зрения состояния их личного состава [Are They Ready to March and Battle? The Combat Capabilities of Naval Squadrons of the Russian Sailing Fleet of the XVIII – Mid-XIX Centuries. From the Point of View of the State of Their Personnel]. More v ogne (in Russian). Saint Petersburg: Gangut. ISBN 978-5-904180-94-2.
- Mattila, Tapani (1983). Meri maamme turvana [Sea Safeguarding Our Country] (in Finnish). Jyväskylä: K. J. Gummerus Osakeyhtiö. ISBN 951-99487-0-8.
- Shirokorad, Aleksandr (2001). Северные войны России [The Northern Wars of Russia] (in Russian). Moscow: AST. ISBN 5-17-009849-9.
- Viinikainen, Sakari; Mäki, Heli (2015). Teatterikuninkaan sota [War of the Theatre King] (in Finnish). Jyväskylä: Docendo. ISBN 978-952-291-165-0.
