= Utti =

Village in Kouvola, Finland

Coordinates: 60°52′55″N 026°55′26″E

Utti is a village in Valkeala, since 2009 a part of Kouvola, Finland. In 1918 General Carl Gustaf Mannerheim set up the first Finnish Air Force base in the village. Today, Utti is best known for the Utti Jaeger Regiment, a helicopter base and a training ground for special forces and military police, and civilian skydiving recreational activities.

== History ==
The modern Utti division of Kouvola in red.

The name of Utti is derived from the Swedish male given name Udde. Utti was first mentioned in 1708 as a division of the village of Haimila within the Valkeala parish, but a farm named Utti has existed since the 16th century.

In 1789 the Battle of Uttismalm took place there between Swedish and Russian forces.

The Utti Jaeger Regiment was formed in 1997.

After the disestablishment of the Valkeala municipality in 2009, Utti became a part of Kouvola.
