= Russian ship Vysheslav =

Ship of the line of the Russian Imperial Navy

Vysheslav was a 66-gun ship of the line of the Imperial Russian Navy Baltic Fleet. She was laid down in 1778 in Arkhangelsk, launched in 1782, and took part in the Russo-Swedish War of 1788–90. Having run aground near Rodsher Island, she was scuttled by her crew on 3 November [O.S. 23 October] 1789.
