= Battle of Hogland =

1788 battle of the Russo-Swedish War of 1788–1790

- Part of the Russo-Swedish War of 1788–1790
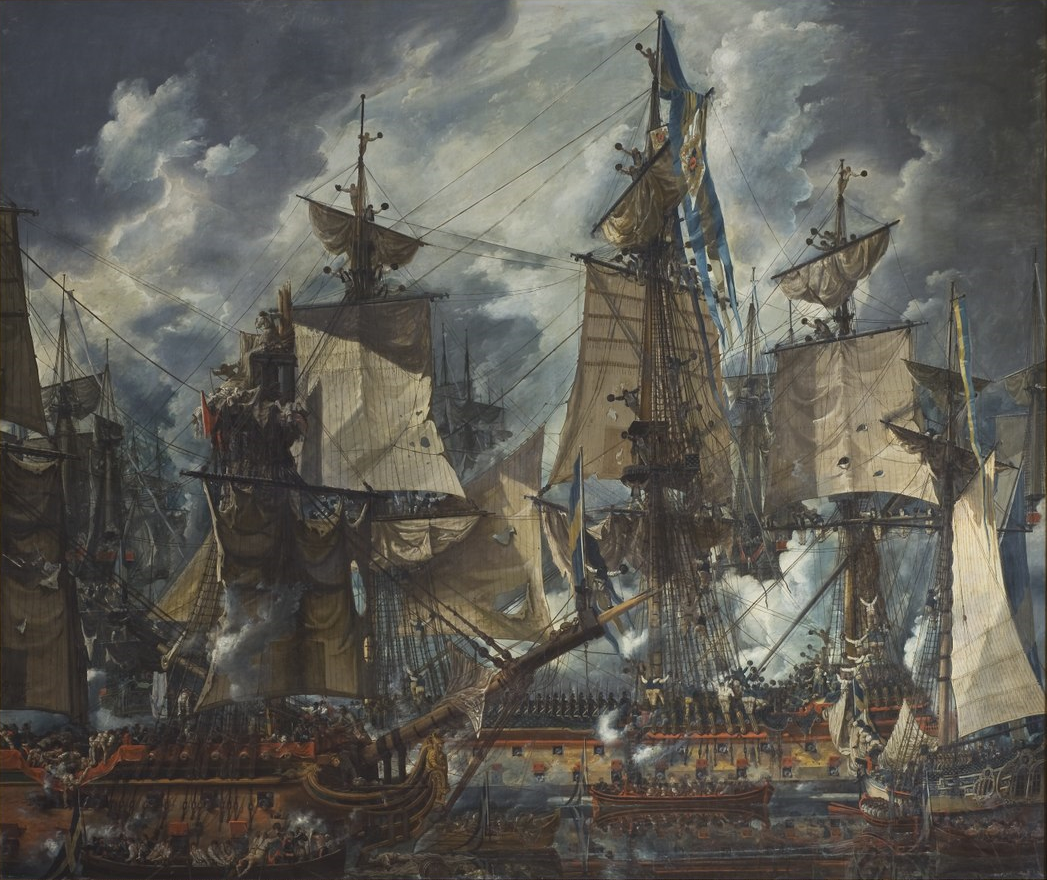
- Battle of Hogland; Louis Jean Desprez
Date	17 July [O.S. 6 July] 1788
Location	Off Hogland, Gulf of Finland
Result	See § Aftermath

Belligerents
Sweden	Russia

Commanders and leaders
Prince Charles, Duke of Södermanland	Samuel Greig

Strength
15 ships of the line 5 frigates 6 light frigates 1,152–1,400 guns ~10,000 men	17 ships of the line 2 frigates 5 light frigates 1,200–1,460 guns ~12,000 men

Casualties and losses
1,000–1,200 killed, wounded, or captured 1 ship of the line captured	580 killed; 720 wounded; 470 captured; 1 ship of the line captured

The Battle of Hogland (Note: Russian: Гогландское сражение, romanized: Goglandskoye srazheniye, lit. 'Battle of Gogland') took place on 17 July [O.S. 6 July] 1788 during the Russo-Swedish War of 1788–1790.

== Origins ==
On the outbreak of war with Russia in 1788, Sweden planned to attack the Russian capital St. Petersburg. One Swedish army was to advance through Finland; a second army, accompanied by the Swedish coastal flotilla, was to advance along the Finnish coast into the Gulf of Finland; while a third army sailed with the Swedish battlefleet in order to land at Oranienbaum to advance on St. Petersburg. To succeed, the Russian Baltic Fleet had to be eliminated or blockaded in its ports at Reval (now Tallinn) and Kronstadt.

A part of the Swedish battlefleet, 12 ships of the line and 5 frigates under the command of Prince Charles, Duke of Södermanland, had set sail from Karlskrona on 9 June 1788. While Prince Charles had overall command of the fleet, he was assisted by Admiral Anton Johan Wrangel (the younger) and had the experienced naval officer Lieutenant Colonel Otto Henrik Nordenskjöld as his flag-captain. Already before the war had started, the fleet had intercepted a small Russian squadron of 3 ships of the line and 4 frigates headed for Denmark and demanded of these to salute his flag, which was in direct contradiction of the treaties of 1743.

After being notified that a state of war was in effect on 7 July, the Swedish fleet headed for Helsingfors to wait for reinforcements. Before reaching their destination, the Swedes intercepted and promptly captured two Russian frigates, which were unaware of the war and were thus caught by surprise. At Helsingfors, three ships of the line joined the fleet, together with one frigate and 2 light frigates of the Swedish archipelago fleet. On 14 July, the Swedish fleet with a column of 20 ships, of which 15 were ships of the line and five were frigates, together with 6 lighter frigates, sailed deeper into the Gulf of Finland.

The Russians were well aware of the Swedish movements in the Baltic Sea but still had hopes that the situation would not escalate into a war. Already on 4 July 1788, Admiral Samuel Greig moved his fleet of 12 ships of the line, 5 frigates and 3 cutters out of Kronstadt. His ships were ordered on 7 July to engage and defeat the Swedish fleet and after receiving reinforcements on 9 July the fleet set off towards the western Gulf of Finland. After being reinforced, the Russian fleet consisted of 17 ships of the line, 7 frigates and 7 smaller ships. As most of the sailors had been recruited shortly beforehand and had no experience in maritime matters, Greig made efforts to exercise his subordinates to improve their skill levels. Light winds left the Russian fleet adrift near the island of Bolshoy Tyuters, and Admiral Grieg used this lull for training his hastily assembled fleet.

== Battle ==
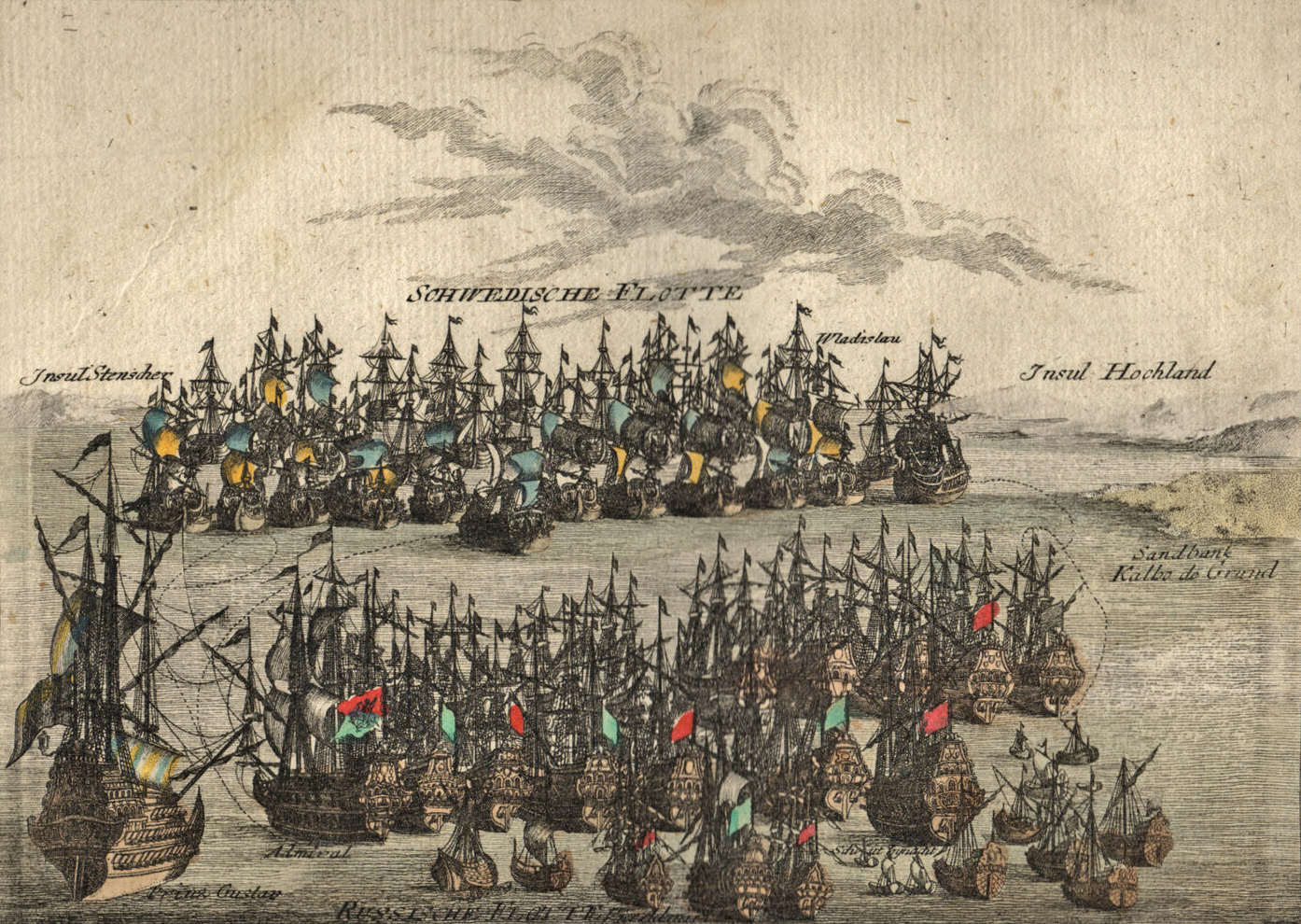
Battle of Hogland, in Nordischer Kriegsschauplaz

Light winds slowed the progress of the fleets and it was not until the morning of 17 July that the opposing fleets were able to see each other. The Swedish fleet formed into line and tried to close in the distance using north-easterly heading. After preparing the ships for battle, the Swedish battle line reversed their direction and headed south in order to avoid the perilous coastal waters. The Russian fleet responded in kind but the turn had reversed their intended battle line and caused some disorder in the vanguard which forced four ships to leave the others behind. The first shots were fired by the Swedish lead ship Hedvig Elisabeth Charlotta at 17:00 on 17 July.

As ships from both sides joined the battle, the already very light winds kept lessening. As the winds diminished it became impossible for ships to maintain their positions by sails alone; currents in the sea forced both sides to use longboats to move and steer their ships. The Swedes also concentrated their fire on the masts and rigging of the Russian ships in order to further impede them.

The Swedish flagship Gustaf III had drawn the attention of the Russian flagship Rostislav and two other Russian ships which concentrated their fire on the Swedish flagship. Damage to the rigging of the Gustaf III made it vulnerable to the currents and the ship started turning, nearly exposing its vulnerable rear to the Russians. The Russians tried to take advantage of this by towing two of their ships into positions where they could fire on the Swedish flagship. Meanwhile, the Russian 74 gun ship of line Vladislav had struck its colors to the Swedish ships Prins Gustaf Adolf and Sofia Magdalena after fierce close range action. The Vladislav had drifted into the Swedish line after losing both its rigging and its longboats.

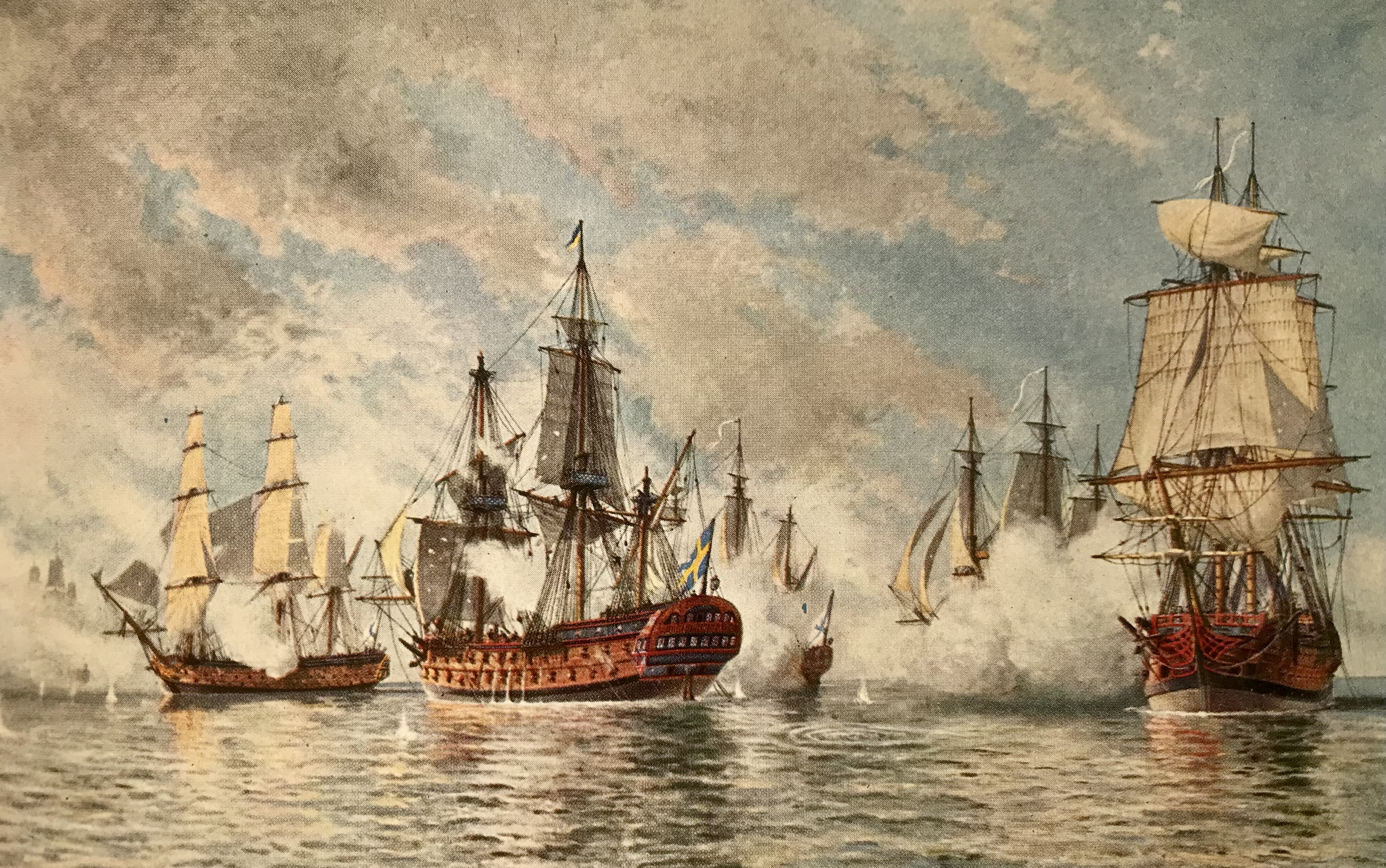
Swedish ship of the line Prins Gustaf in battle with Russian ships. Later depiction by Jacob Hägg.

By 20:00 in the evening the Swedish ship of the line Prins Gustaf, commanded by Vice-Admiral Gustav Wachtmeister, which had finally forced its opponent, the Russian ship of the line Svetaja Jelena to depart from the battle line, was engaged by another Russian ship of the line Vseslav. Calm winds had not dissipated the thick clouds of gunpowder smoke which hid the Prins Gustaf from the other Swedish ships which by this time had turned around, leaving the Swedish ship to face several Russian ships alone. Prins Gustaf was pounded by four Russian ships of the line and was forced to strike its colors. Disorder in the Swedish line following the turn and the visible attempts to tow the flagship away from the battle line made the Russians believe that they had won the battle. Gunfire finally ended with the surrender of Prins Gustaf by 22:00 on 17 July 1788.

Swedish flag-captain Nordenskiöld intended to resume the engagement in the first light but the reports of severe damage to the ships as well as lack of ammunition prevented this and instead at 03:00 on 18 July the Swedish fleet was ordered to sail to Sveaborg. Swedish fleet had come better off from the engagement as unlike the Russian fleet it had been able to sail away from the battle. Nine of the ships of the line had suffered only light damage while a full third of the ships in the fleet had suffered heavy but mostly repairable damage to the hull, riggings and masts.

The Russian fleet under Admiral Greig had been unable to chase the Swedish and was forced to lay anchor at the site of the engagement. Several ships had been hulled and remained afloat only by pumps. Eight of the Russian ships of the line had been severely damaged and four of those could no longer be sailed but had to be towed away. The Russian fleet started slowly back towards Kronstadt on 19 July after critical repairs. On the return voyage the fleet encountered heavy weather near the island of Seskar, causing more damage to some of the ships.

== Aftermath ==
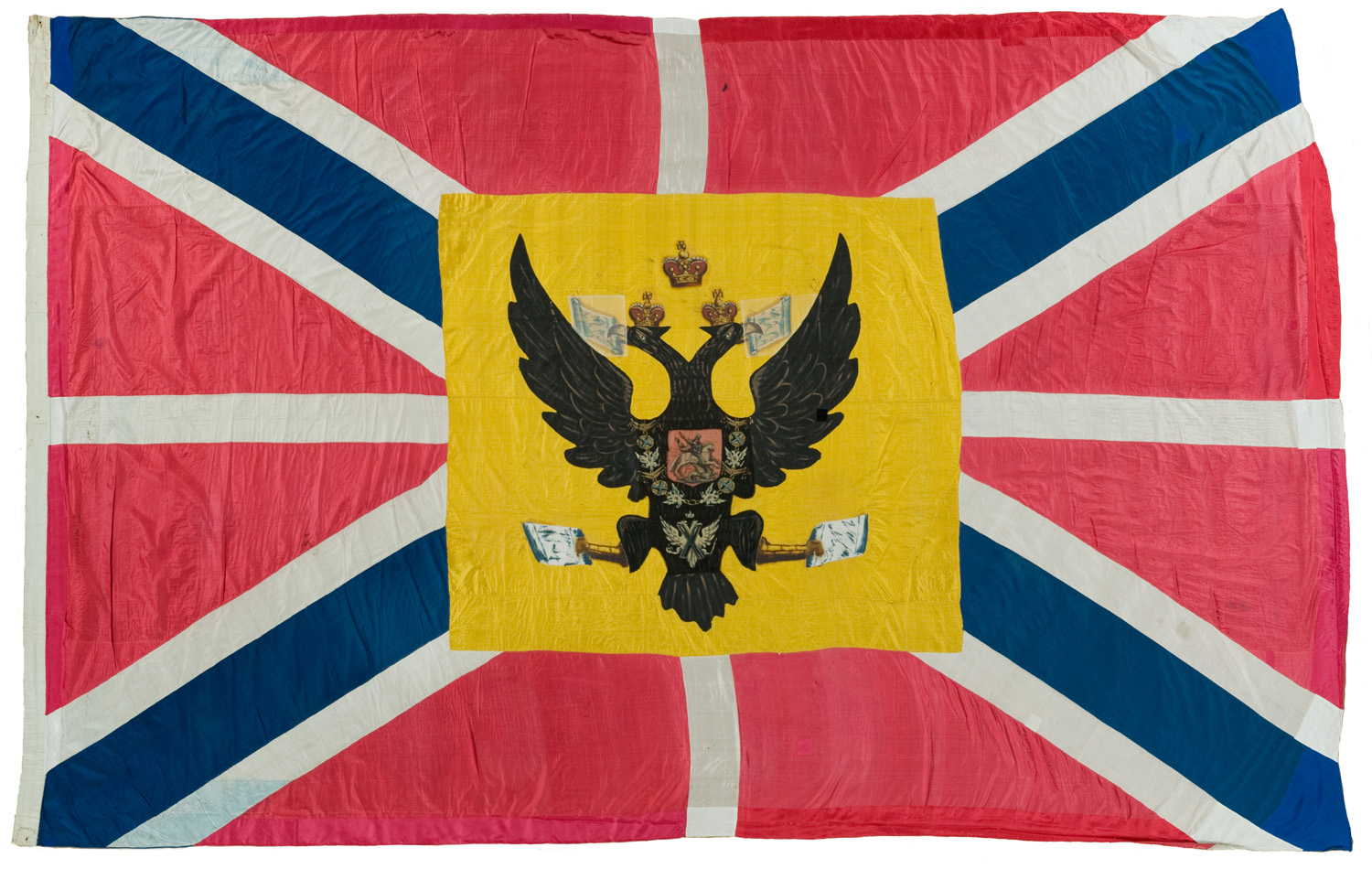
Russian flag captured by the Swedish Navy from the ship Vladislav. Currently in the Maritime Museum of Stockholm.

Unusually for a naval battle, both sides captured one ship, each. The Swedes fared slightly better in the artillery duel, leaving four Russian ships dead in the water, but failed to capitalize on their success, while all Swedish ships were able to set sail after the battle. The Russians suffered the worst casualties, losing 319-580 men killed compared to between 200 and 300 Swedes, but the battle was a strategic victory for the Russians because Greig had done enough to prevent the Swedish landing.

One reason why the fight had ended even though Swedish battlefleet had the advantage was that the Swedish fleet was rapidly running out of ammunition, especially for its heavier cannons, and had to depart. The Swedish battlefleet retired to Sveaborg for repairs and resupply. However, upon arriving, the prepared stocks at the Swedish forward base were noticed to have been prepared solely with the coastal or archipelago fleet in mind. The result of this was that the Swedish battlefleet had sailed to Sveaborg only to be stranded there, as the ships could not be re-armed or repaired. The situation was aggravated when a small Russian squadron under James Trevenen blockaded Hangö, cutting the coastal sea route and causing considerable problems for Swedish material deliveries from Sweden.

Admiral Greig hurried the repairs of the Russian fleet and constructed a forward base on the island of Seskar to accomplish this. Already by 5 August, the Russian fleet set sail towards Sveaborg. It encountered a Swedish squadron which had been tasked with investigating the status of the Russian fleet outside of Sveaborg in the early hours of 6 August. The Swedish ships fled disorderly to the safety of the fortress, but the ship of the line Prins Gustaf Adolf ran into a previously unknown reef at full speed and with full sails. The Ship then grounded on the rock and started flooding heavily. Water quickly also flooded the ship's gunpowder magazines, forcing it to strike its colours. The Russians took the crew as prisoners but were unable to re-float the ship and instead torched it.

Prisoners the Swedes had captured from the Vladislav had carried relapsing fever, which now spread widely amongst the Swedish crews at Sveaborg, further impeding any chances of getting the fleet either ready to sail or ready to fight. The Russian fleet under Admiral Greig had total control over the Baltic Sea and with new ships could deploy a total of 18 ships of the line. Control of Reval made it easy for the Russians to maintain their blockade.

== Order of battle ==
=== Sweden ===
- 4 × 70-gun ships – Konung Gustaf III, Prins Gustaf, Sophia Magdalena, Enigheten.
- 11 × 60–62-gun ships – Hedvig Elisabeth Charlotta, Ömheten, Rättvisan, Dygden, Wasa, Fäderneslandet, Äran, Försiktigheten, Prins Carl, Prins Fredrik Adolf, Kronprins Gustaf Adolf
- 7 × frigates – Thetis 40, Minerva 40, Froja 40, Camilla 40, Gripen 40, Jarramas 34, Jarislawitz 32.

(1,242 guns +/-)

=== Russia ===
- 1 × 100-gun three decker – Rostislav
- 8 × 74-gun ships – Kir Ioann, Iaroslav, Vladislav, Sviatoi Piotr, Mstislav, Sviataia Elena, Vseslav, Ioann Bogoslov.
- 8 × 66-gun ships – Pamiat' Evstafia, Viktor, Iziaslav, Rodislav, Mecheslav, Vysheslav, Boleslav, Deris.
- 7 × frigates – Briachislav 38, Mstislavets 42, Slava 32, Vozmislav 32, Podrazhislav 32, Premislav 32, Nadezhda Blagopoluchiia 32.

(1,460 guns +/-)

== Bibliography ==
- Anderson, R. C. Naval Wars in the Baltic, 1522–1850 (London, 1969)
- Derry, T. K. 'Scandinavia' in The New Cambridge Modern History, Volume IX (Cambridge, 1965).
- (in Finnish) Johnsson, Raoul (2011). Grönroos, Maria; Karttunen, Ilkka (eds.). Kustaa III ja suuri merisota [Gustaf III and the Great Naval War] (in Finnish). Helsinki: John Nurminen Foundation. ISBN 978-952-9745-31-9.
- Mattila, Tapani (1983). Meri maamme turvana [Sea safeguarding our country] (in Finnish). Jyväskylä: K. J. Gummerus Osakeyhtiö. ISBN 951-99487-0-8.
- Unger, Gunnar (1909). Illustrerad Svensk sjökrigshistoria: förra delen. Omfattande tiden intill 1680 [Illustrated Swedish naval history: part one. Covering the period until 1680] (in Swedish). Stockholm: Bonnier. OCLC 464453208.
- Burke, Edmund (1790). The Annual Register, Or, A View of the History, Politics, and Literature for the Year. Volume 30. London: J. Dodsley. OCLC 510653362.
- Jägerhorn, Georg Henrik [in Swedish] (2004). Hakala, Petra; Hakala, Pertti (eds.). I fält för Gustaf III: beskrivning över kampanjen i Savolax 1788-1790 [In the field for Gustaf III: description of the campaign in Savolax 1788-1790] (in Swedish). Helsinki: Atlantis & Society of Swedish Literature in Finland. ISBN 9789174868142.
