= List of shipwrecks in September 1854 =

The list of shipwrecks in September 1854 includes ships sunk, foundered, wrecked, grounded, or otherwise lost during September 1854.

== 1 September ==
List of shipwrecks: 1 September 1854
Ship	State	Description
Jemima Pereira	(United Kingdom of Great Britain and Ireland) Straits Settlements	The East Indiaman capsized and sank with the loss of nine of the 36 people on board. She was on a voyage from Ampenan, Netherlands East Indies to Singapore.
Marianne	Prussia	The full-rigged ship collided with Minerva (Bremen) and sank in the Atlantic Ocean off Land's End, Cornwall, United Kingdom and sank with the loss of two of her crew. She was on a voyage from Pembroke, United Kingdom to Danzig.
Sprightly	United Kingdom	The schooner ran aground at the Sand Head, Hampshire. She was refloated the next day with assistance from the tug Ranger (United Kingdom) and towed in to Ryde, Isle of Wight.

== 2 September ==
List of shipwrecks: 2 September 1854
Ship	State	Description
Four Sisters	United Kingdom	The barque was abandoned in the Atlantic Ocean. She was on a voyage from Saint John, New Brunswick, British North America to Hull, Yorkshire.
Stentor	United Kingdom	The ship ran aground at Berwick upon Tweed, Northumberland. She was on a voyage from Saint John, New Brunswick, British North America to Berwick upon Tweed.

== 4 September ==
List of shipwrecks: 4 September 1854
Ship	State	Description
Abiah	United States	Bound from Chicago, Illinois, for Oconto, Wisconsin, in ballast with a crew of seven and two passengers aboard, the 134-foot (41 m) vessel — described by various sources as a brig, a two-masted schooner, and a three-masted schooner — capsized almost immediately and became a complete wreck when she was caught in a squall on Lake Michigan approximately 10 to 15 nautical miles (19 to 28 km; 12 to 17 mi) east of Sheboygan, Wisconsin. The schooner Lewis Luddington (United States) rescued all on board. Some sources claim she sank immediately after capsizing, others that she sank later while under tow by Lewis Luddington, and others that she sank later while under tow by the tug Eclipse (United States). A wreck discovered in 2019 at 43°45.022′N 087°23.884′W may be that of Abiah.

== 5 September ==
List of shipwrecks: 5 September 1854
Ship	State	Description
Eclipse	United Kingdom	The ship ran aground on The Gantocks, in the Firth of Clyde and was wrecked. All on board were rescued.

== 7 September ==
List of shipwrecks: 7 September 1854
Ship	State	Description
City	United States	The ship grounded and was wrecked in Sakhalin Gulf in the western Sea of Okhotsk. Seven men were lost before they were able to reach shore. The rest of the crew made it to a nearby Russian village and sailed for home on a brig.
City of Philadelphia	United Kingdom	The passenger ship was wrecked during her maiden voyage near Cape Race, Newfoundland. All on board survived.
Cornucopia	United Kingdom	The ship was wrecked on Bornholm, Denmark.
Delia Maria	United States	During a voyage from Liverpool, Lancashire, United Kingdom to Charleston, South Carolina, the square-rigged ship foundered in a hurricane in the North Atlantic Ocean off Hilton Head Island, South Carolina without loss of life. Future Secretary of the Treasury of the Confederate States of America George Trenholm was among those on board.
Eureka	United States	The brig sank in a hurricane at Charleston, South Carolina.
Neptunus	Norway	The brig was driven ashore in the Kvarken. Her eleven crew were rescued by the brig Eweretta (United Kingdom). Neptune was on a voyage from Skellefteå, Sweden to London, United Kingdom. She was taken in tow, but the tow rope broke and she came ashore on the coast of the Grand Duchy of Finland. She was subsequently towed in to Sundsvall, Sweden by HMS Odin (Royal Navy).

== 8 September ==
List of shipwrecks: 8 September 1854
Ship	State	Description
Alexina	United Kingdom	The barque was abandoned in the Atlantic Ocean. Her crew were rescued by Greenfield (United States). Alexina was on a voyage from Manzanilla, Trinidad to Cork.

== 9 September ==
List of shipwrecks: 9 September 1854
Ship	State	Description
Hannah Maria	United Kingdom	The ship was wrecked near Melbourne, Victoria. Her crew were rescued.

== 10 September ==
List of shipwrecks: 10 September 1854
Ship	State	Description
Poultney	United Kingdom	The brig was abandoned in the Atlantic Ocean. Her crew were rescued by the schooner Jupiter (Portugal). Poultney was on a voyage from Liverpool, Lancashire to Norfolk Island.
San Filomena	Kingdom of the Two Sicilies	The brig caught fire at Trieste.
Shenandoah	United States	The ship foundered in the Atlantic Ocean (39°48′N 70°24′W) in a hurricane with the loss of a crew member. Survivors took to the pinnace. They were rescued by the barque Brilliant (United Kingdom). Shenandoah was on a voyage from New York to Liverpool, Lancashire, United Kingdom.

== 11 September ==
List of shipwrecks: 11 September 1854
Ship	State	Description
Aberdina Lammecheina	Flag unknown	The ship was driven ashore near Skasen, Norway. She was on a voyage from Bergen, Norway to Danzig.
Arkhangel Gavriil	Imperial Russian Navy	Crimean War: The Sultan Makhmud-class ship of the line was sunk as a blockship in the Danube at Silistra.
Flora	Imperial Russian Navy	Crimean War, Siege of Sevastopol: The Tenedos-class frigate was sunk as a blockship at Sevastopol.
Lord Lambton	United Kingdom	The ship was abandoned in the Atlantic Ocean. Her crew were rescued by Adeline (United Kingdom). Lord Lambton was on a voyage from South Shields, County Durham to Quebec City, Province of Canada, British North America.
HMS Rhadamanthus	Royal Navy	The storeship ran aground in the Solent off Hurst Castle, Hampshire. She was refloated with assistance from HMS Echo, HMS Salamander and HMS Sphinx (all Royal Navy) and taken in to Portsmouth, Hampshire.
Selafail	Imperial Russian Navy	Crimean War, Siege of Sevastopol: The Sultan Makhmud-class ship of the line was sunk as a blockship at Sevastopol.
Silistriya	Imperial Russian Navy	Crimean War, Siege of Sevastopol : The Imperatritsa Maria-class ship of the line was scuttled as a blockship at Sevastopol.
Sizopol	Imperial Russian Navy	Crimean War, Siege of Sevastopol: The Tenedos-class frigate was scuttled as a blockship at Sevastopol.
Tri Svyatitelya	Imperial Russian Navy	Crimean War, Siege of Sevastopol: The ship of the line was scuttled as a blockship at Sevastopol.
Uriil	Imperial Russian Navy	Crimean War, Siege of Sevastopol: The Sultan Makhmud-class ship of the line was sunk as a blockship at Sevastopol.
Varna	Imperial Russian Navy	Crimean War, Siege of Sevastopol: The Sultan Makhmud-class ship of the line was sunk as a blockship at Sevastopol.

== 12 September ==
List of shipwrecks: 12 September 1854
Ship	State	Description
Chancellor	United Kingdom	The ship was driven ashore 15 to 20 nautical miles (28 to 37 km) east of Struys Point, Cape Colony with the loss of two of her crew. She was on a voyage from Bombay, India to London.

== 13 September ==
List of shipwrecks: 13 September 1854
Ship	State	Description
Agenora	(United Kingdom of Great Britain and Ireland) British North America	The barque was abandoned in the Atlantic Ocean. Her crew were rescued by Oxnard (United Kingdom). Agenora was on a voyage from South Shields, County Durham to New York, United States.
Emma	Rostock	The ship sprang a leak and sank 8 nautical miles (15 km) off the Isle of May, United Kingdom. Her crew were rescued. She was on a voyage from Aberdour, Fife, United Kingdom to Rostock.
Fanny	United Kingdom	The smack sprang a leak and sank east of Dunarth Head. She was on a voyage from Greenock to Glasgow, Lanarkshire.
Maid of Lorn	United Kingdom	The steamship struck a rock and sank in the Crinan Canal. She was on a voyage from the Clyde to Inverness.
Maria	Kingdom of Hanover	The schooner sank in the North Sea. Her crew survived. She was on a voyage from Neuhaus to Hull, Yorkshire, United Kingdom.
Waterlily	United Kingdom	The ship was abandoned in the Atlantic Ocean. Her crew took to the longboat; they were rescued on 17 September by Progress (United Kingdom). Waterlily was on a voyage from Hull, Yorkshire to Mobile, Alabama, United States.

== 14 September ==
List of shipwrecks: 14 September 1854
Ship	State	Description
Adele	Kingdom of Hanover	The galiot was abandoned in the North Sea off Borkum. Her crew were rescued. She was on a voyage from London, United Kingdom to Hamburg.
Martha	United Kingdom	The flat was run into by the steamship Jackal in the River Mersey. She was taken in to St. George's Dock, Liverpool, Lancashire where she sank.
Robert Alexander Parke	United Kingdom	The barque was abandoned in the Atlantic Ocean. Her crew were rescued by Cosmo (United Kingdom). Robert Alexander Parke was on a voyage from Quebec City, Province of Canada, British North America to Belfast, County Antrim.

== 15 September ==
List of shipwrecks: 15 September 1854
Ship	State	Description
Canada	United Kingdom	The barque was abandoned in the Atlantic Ocean. Her crew were rescued by Levens (United Kingdom). Canada was on a voyage from Quebec City, Province of Canada, British North America to Liverpool, Lancashire. She drove ashore at Petites, Newfoundland and was wrecked.
Devonport	United Kingdom	The full-rigged ship was abandoned in the Atlantic Ocean. All eighteen people on board were rescued by the brig Regent (United Kingdom). Devonport was on a voyage from Quebec City to Liverpool.
Novidade	Mexico	The ship was wrecked on the Alacranes. All on board were rescued. She was on a voyage from Liverpool to Veracruz.
Rivals	United Kingdom	The brig was wrecked on the Wicklow Banks, in the Irish Sea. Her crew survived. She was on a voyage from the Clyde to Genoa, Kingdom of Sardinia.

== 16 September ==
List of shipwrecks: 16 September 1854
Ship	State	Description
Clyde	United Kingdom	The ship departed from the Cape of Good Hope, Cape Colony for Melbourne, Victoria. No further trace, presumed foundered with the loss of all hands.

== 17 September ==
List of shipwrecks: 17 September 1854
Ship	State	Description
Agitator	United Kingdom	The ship was driven ashore between Roqueta and Adra, Spain. She was on a voyage from Alexandria, Egypt to Falmouth, Cornwall or Queenstown, County Cork. She had become a wreck by 20 September.
Diamond	United Kingdom	The ship was wrecked on the Morant Cays. Her crew were rescued on 28 September. She was on a voyage from Savanilla, Republic of New Granada to London.
Dove	United Kingdom	The ship ran aground on the Silloth Bank, in the Irish Sea off the coast of Cumberland. Her crew survived. She was on a voyage from Havana, Cuba to the Clyde. She broke up on 20 September.
Louise	United Kingdom	The barque was wrecked on a reef in the Turks Islands.
Oceanus	Norway	The barque was in collision with another vessel and sank in the English Channel 16 nautical miles (30 km) south east of Start Point, Devon with the loss of one of her seventeen crew. Six survivors were rescued by a fishing smack, the remainder took to a boat. Neptunus was on a voyage from Akyab, Burma to Queenstown, County Cork and Amsterdam, North Holland, Netherlands.
Sarah	United Kingdom	The brig was abandoned in the Atlantic Ocean (37°10′N 65°00′W). Her crew were rescued by the brix Express ( (United Kingdom of Great Britain and Ireland) British North America). Sarah was on a voyage from Genoa, Kingdom of Sardinia to Baltimore, Maryland, United States.
Waterwitch	United Kingdom	The ship was wrecked on King's Island, New South Wales. All on board were rescued. She was on a voyage from Melbourne, Victoria to Mauritius.

== 18 September ==
List of shipwrecks: 18 September 1854
Ship	State	Description
Camertonian	United Kingdom	The ship was lost at the Sand Heads, at the mouth of the Hooghly River with the loss of all but two of her crew. She was on a voyage from Liverpool, Lancashire to Calcutta, India.
Ellida	Norway	The schooner was driven ashore on Flotta, Orkney Islands, United Kingdom. She was on a voyage from Arendal to Liverpool, Lancashire, United Kingdom. She was refloated and taken in to Stromness, Orkney Islands in a waterlogged condition.

== 19 September ==
List of shipwrecks: 19 September 1854
Ship	State	Description
Austerlitz	French Navy	The Hercule-class ship of the line ran aground in Åland, Grand Duchy of Finland. She was refloated.
Cobequid	United States	The brig departed from the Clyde for Boston, Massachusetts. No further trace, presumed foundered with the loss of all hands.

== 20 September ==
List of shipwrecks: 20 September 1854
Ship	State	Description
Ann Smith	United Kingdom	The ship was driven ashore and wrecked at Richibucto, New Brunswick, British North America.
Charlotte	United Kingdom	The troopship was wrecked in Algoa Bay, Cape Colony, after anchors were lost during a gale. 99 of her 208 passengers and 18 of her 24 crew were lost. Charlotte was on a voyage from Queenstown, County Cork to Calcutta, India.
Eliza Ernst	France	The brigantine was wrecked at the mouth of the Guadalquivir. She was on a voyage from Newport, Monmouthshire, United Kingdom to Venice, Kingdom of Lombardy–Venetia.
Mozambique	United Kingdom	The ship was wrecked at Sydney, New South Wales.
St. George	United Kingdom	The barque was wrecked in Chaleur Bay with the loss of her captain.
Stornoway	United States	The ship ran aground on the Brock Reef, in Cardigan Bay. Her crew were rescued. She was on a voyage from Saint John, New Brunswick, British North America to Dublin, United Kingdom.

== 21 September ==
List of shipwrecks: 21 September 1854
Ship	State	Description
Diana	United Kingdom	The schooner was driven ashore at Southport, Lancashire. Her crew were rescued by the Southport Lifeboat. She was on a voyage from Liverpool, Lancashire to Africa. Diana was refloated on 7 October and towed into the River Mersey.
USS Porpoise	United States Navy	The Dolphin-class brigantine was last sighted in the South China Sea off Formosa. Presumably, she subsequently foundered in a typhoon with the loss of all hands.
Satellite	United Kingdom	The steamship became disabled in Liverpool Bay. Her passengers were taken off by the Magazines Lifeboat. She was on a voyage from Bangor to Liverpool. She was subsequently towed in to the River Mersey.

== 22 September ==
List of shipwrecks: 22 September 1854
Ship	State	Description
Foreigner	United Kingdom	The ship wrecked between New Harbour and Torbay Point, Nova Scotia. She was on a voyage from Souris, Prince Edward Island to Portsmouth, Hampshire.
Neptune	United Kingdom	The brig ran aground on the Blacktail Sand, in the Thames Estuary. She was refloated and resumed her voyage.
Stiftsamtman Fransen	Norway	The schooner departed from Stockholm, Sweden for Hull, Yorkshire, United Kingdom. No further trace, presumed foundered with the loss of all hands.

== 23 September ==
List of shipwrecks: 23 September 1854
Ship	State	Description
Cleopatra	United States	The clipper struck a sunken wreck in the Atlantic Ocean (23°31′S 31°19′W). She consequently foundered on 25 September. Her 26 crew survived. She was on a voyage from Callao, Peru to New York.
Eliza	United Kingdom	The schooner was in collision with the brig Clara (United Kingdom) and foundered in The Swin, off the coast of Essex with the loss of three lives.
Gazelle	United Kingdom	The brig was driven ashore and wrecked near Point Carnero, Spain. Her crew were rescued. She was on a voyage from Alexandria, Egypt to Falmouth, Cornwall or Queenstown, County Cork.

== 24 September ==
List of shipwrecks: 24 September 1854
Ship	State	Description
Anna Catharina	Denmark	The ship was wrecked on Baltrum, Kingdom of Hanover. Her crew were rescued. She was on a voyage from Skive to London, United Kingdom.
Charles and Jane	United States	The ship ran aground off the Drogden Lightship (Denmark). She was on a voyage from Stockholm, Sweden to Boston, Massachusetts.
Greetina	Kingdom of Hanover	The full-rigged ship departed from Newcastle upon Tyne, Northumberland, United Kingdom for Varel. No further trace, presumed foundered with the loss of all hands.
Lawrence Delaney	United Kingdom	The ship struck The Platters, in the Irish Sea. She was on a voyage from Barrow-in-Furness, Lancashire to Neath, Glamorgan. She put in to Holyhead, Anglesey.
Queen Victoria	United Kingdom	The ship sprang a leak and was beached in the Magdalen Islands, Nova Scotia, British North America. She was on a voyage from Quebec City, Province of Canada, British North America to Plymouth, Devon.
Templeman	United Kingdom	The ship was beached at Secharon Point, Van Diemen's Land. She was on a voyage from Liverpool, Lancashire to Hobart, Van Diemen's land.
Udo Friedrich	Norway	The schooner was wrecked 20 nautical miles (37 km) south of Brindisi, Kingdom of the Two Sicilies. She was on a voyage from Venice, Kingdom of Lombardy–Venetia to London, United Kingdom.

== 25 September ==
List of shipwrecks: 25 September 1854
Ship	State	Description
Acanthus	United Kingdom	The brig was destroyed by fire in the Atlantic Ocean with the loss of a crew member. Survivors took to the longboat; they were rescued on 9 October by Falcon (United Kingdom). Acanthus was on a voyage from Demerara, British Guiana to London.
Admiral Drake	United Kingdom	The schooner was wrecked on the Klein Vogelsand, in the North Sea off the mouth of the Elbe. Her crew were rescued.
Appoline	United Kingdom	The ship was wrecked 1 nautical mile (1.9 km) west of Baracoa, Cuba. Her crew were rescued.
Frances Walker	United Kingdom	The barque was wrecked on the Great Barrier Reef. All on board survived. She was on a voyage from Sydney, New South Wales to Manila, Spanish East Indies.
John Francis	United Kingdom	The ship was abandoned in the Atlantic Ocean (46°40′N 57°59′W). Her crew were rescued by the barque Repeater (United Kingdom). John Francis was on a voyage from Quebec City, Province of Canada, British North America to Liverpool, Lancashire.
Sultana	United Kingdom	The barque was wrecked on the Great Barrier Reef. All on board survived. She was on a voyage from Sydney to Manila.
Twee Gesusters	Netherlands	The ship was driven ashore at "Melkewerum". She was on a voyage from Emden, Kingdom of Hanover to Rotterdam, South Holland.
Union	United Kingdom	The barque was wrecked on the Hartmell Reef, off Boa Vista Island. All on board were rescued. She was on voyage from London to Launceston, Van Diemen's Land.

== 26 September ==
List of shipwrecks: 26 September 1854
Ship	State	Description
Diamond	United Kingdom	The ship was destroyed by fire at Aden.
Diana	Duchy of Holstein	The ship was lost at the entrance to the Agger Canal, Denmark. Her crew were rescued. She was on a voyage from an Hartlepool, County Durham, United Kingdom to Flensburg.
Ellen Crawford	United Kingdom	The ship was driven ashore at Nidden, Prussia with the loss of a crew member. She was on a voyage from London to Memel, Prussia. She had broken up by 29 September.
Francis Walker	United Kingdom	The ship was wrecked in the Torres Straits. One survivor was rescued by the full-rigged ship Chili (United States). The remainder of her passengers and crew reached Copang, Netherlands East Indies in a boat on 1 November. Francis Walker was on a voyage from Sydney, New South Wales to Guam.
Jonge Jacob	Netherlands	The ship sank in the Atlantic Ocean. Her crew were rescued by Johannes Hermanus (Netherlands). Jonge Jacob was on a voyage from Havana, Cuba to Cowes, Isle of Wight, United Kingdom.
Sultana	United Kingdom	The barque was wrecked in the Torres Straits. There were at least four survivors; they were rescued by the full-rigged ship Chili (United States). Sultana was on a voyage from Sydney to Guam.
Union	United Kingdom	The brig was wrecked on Boa Vista, Cape Verde Islands. Her crew were rescued. She was on a voyage from Rio de Janeiro, Brazil to London.

== 27 September ==
List of shipwrecks: 27 September 1854
Ship	State	Description
Arctic	United States	Arctic. SS Arctic disaster: The paddle steamer collided with Vesta (France) in the Atlantic Ocean 50 nautical miles (93 km) off the coast of Newfoundland and sank with the loss of about 300 lives. She was on a voyage from New York to Liverpool, Lancashire, United Kingdom.
Courier	United Kingdom	The transport ship ran aground in the Bosphorus near "Tenikai", Ottoman Empire. She was refloated.
Eagle	United Kingdom	The ship ran aground on the Corton Sand, in the North Sea off the coast of Suffolk. She was on a voyage from Montrose, Forfarshire to London. She was refloated the next day.
Ganges	United Kingdom	The barque ran aground at Miramichi, New Brunswick, British North America. She was on a voyage from Miramichi to Kingstown, County Dublin. She was later refloated and resumed her voyage.
Gleaner	United Kingdom	The schooner ran aground off North Somercotes, Lincolnshire. She was refloated the next day and taken in to Grimsby.
Swordfish	United Kingdom	The ship was driven ashore and wrecked at Petit-Métis, Province of Canada, British North America. She was on a voyage from Bristol, Gloucestershire to Quebec City, Province of Canada.

== 28 September ==
List of shipwrecks: 28 September 1854
Ship	State	Description
Corporal Trim	United Kingdom	The barque ran aground and sank off Ragged Island, Maine, United States. Her crew survived. She was on a voyage from Liverpool, Lancashire to Baltimore, Maryland, United States.

== 29 September ==
List of shipwrecks: 29 September 1854
Ship	State	Description
Glaucus	United Kingdom	The ship was wrecked on West Falkland, Falkland Islands. Her crew were rescued. She was on a voyage from Liverpool, Lancashire to Valparaíso, Chile.
Maria	United Kingdom	The ship departed from Grangemouth, Stirlingshire for Stettin. No further trace, presumed foundered with the loss of all hands.
Ocean	United Kingdom	The paddle steamer ran aground off Ringsend, County Dublin. She was refloated the next day with assistance from PS Hibernia (United Kingdom).

== 30 September ==
List of shipwrecks: 30 September 1854
Ship	State	Description
Black River Packet	United Kingdom	The ship ran aground in the Yangtze. She was on a voyage from Labuan, Malaya to Shanghai, China. She was refloated and taken in to Shanghai in a sinking condition.
Lady Hood Mackenzie	United Kingdom	The ship departed from Sunderland, County Durham for Calcutta, India. No further trace, presumed foundered with the loss of all on board.
Robert and Alice	United Kingdom	The sloop was wrecked in the Orkney Islands with the loss of all hands.
Royal Stuart	United Kingdom	The ship beached at Shoebury, Essex. She was on a voyage from London to Canterbury, New Zealand. She was refloated the next day with the aid of a steamship and resumed her voyage.
Soundary	United Kingdom	The ship ran aground in the Yangtze. She was on a voyage from Hong Kong to Shanghai, China. She was refloated and taken in to Shanghai in a sinking condition.
Victoria	United Kingdom	The barque was wrecked in the Magdalen Islands, Nova Scotia, British North America. Her crew survived. She was on a voyage from Quebec City, Province of Canada, British North America to Bristol, Gloucestershire.

== Unknown date ==
List of shipwrecks: Unknown date in September 1854
Ship	State	Description
USS Albany	United States Navy	The sloop-of-war departed from Aspinwall, Republic of New Granada on 28 September. No further trace, presumed to have foundered with the loss of all 193 hands.
Amis Becenis	France	The ship was wrecked on Bull Island. She was on a voyage from Martinique to Wilmington, Delaware, United States.
Bayard	France	The ship capsized off "Cape Maison" before 14 September.
Emily	United Kingdom	The full-rigged ship foundered in the Pacific Ocean 600 nautical miles (1,100 km) off Callao, Peru. Her crew survived. She was on a voyage from Callao to Valencia, Spain.
Governor	United Kingdom	The ship was abandoned at sea. Her crew were rescued by Cerrero (Spain).
Lady Caroline	United Kingdom	The ship was abandoned in the Atlantic Ocean before 4 September.
Mary Caroline	United Kingdom	The ship was abandoned in the Atlantic Ocean before 4 September.
Maxwell	United Kingdom	The ship was driven ashore and wrecked at Baltimore, Maryland, United States. She was on a voyage from Santa Cruz to Liverpool, Lancashire.
Merlin	United Kingdom	The ship was wrecked on the coast of Labrador, British North America before 5 September. Her crew were rescued.
Nimrod	United Kingdom	The transport ship struck a sunken rock in Åland and was holed. She put in to Stockholm, Sweden in a sinking condition before 21 September.
Shearwater	United Kingdom	The ship was abandoned in the Atlantic Ocean. Her crew were rescued by Hampden (United Kingdom). Shearwater was on a voyage from Boston, Massachusetts, United States to Australia.
St. Lawrence	United Kingdom	The ship was driven ashore at Saint-Thomas, Province of Canada, British North America. She was on a voyage from liverpool, Lancashire to Montreal, Province of Canada.
United Kingdom	United Kingdom	The brig was abandoned in the Atlantic Ocean before 29 September.
Vifredo	Royal Navy	The hired transport ship, a steamship, ran aground on the Owers Sandbank, in the English Channel. She was refloated and taken in to Portsmouth, Hampshire.
Washington	United Kingdom	The ship was driven ashore and wrecked 15 nautical miles (28 km) south of Bahia, Brazil.
