= Russian ship Iagudiil (1843) =

Ship of the line of the Russian Imperial Navy

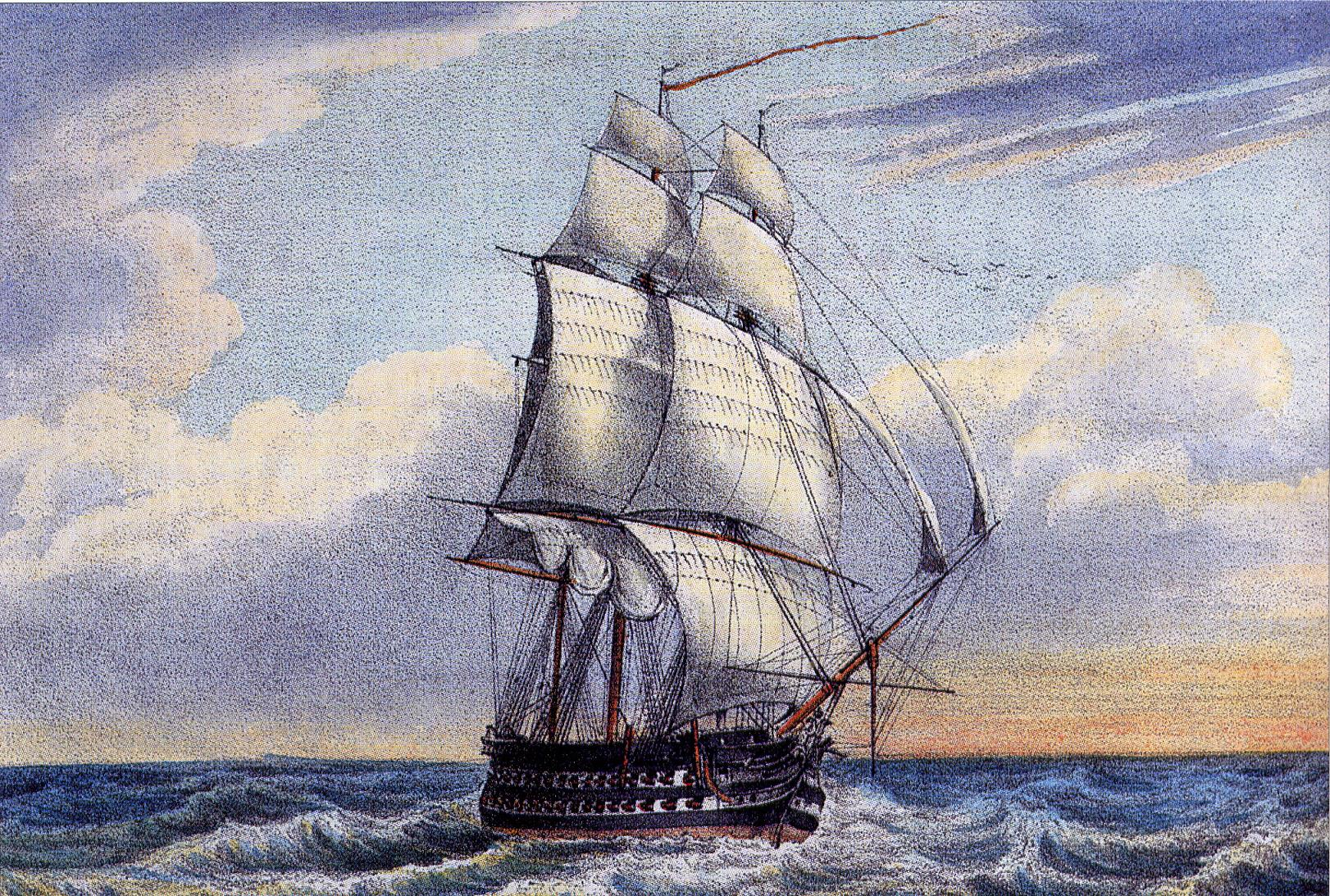
- Painting of Iagudiil's sister ship Sultan Makhmud under sail

History

Russian Empire
- Name: Iagudiil
- Builder: I. S. Dimitriev, Nikolaev
- Laid down: 21 September 1839
- Launched: 17 September 1843
- Fate: Burned, 28 August 1855

General characteristics
- Class & type: Sultan Makhmud-class ship of the line
- Displacement: 3,790 metric tons (3,730 long tons; 4,180 short tons)
- Length: 196 ft (60 m)
- Beam: 53 ft 6 in (16.31 m)
- Draft: 26 ft 7 in (8.10 m)
- Armament: 26 × 36-pound long guns; 32 × 36-pound short guns; 20 × 24-pound gunnades; 2 × 24 -pound carronades; 7 × 18-pound carronades; 2 × 12-pound carronades; 2 × 8-pound carronades

Iagudiil was a Sultan Makhmud-class ship of the line built for the Imperial Russian Navy's Black Sea Fleet in the 1840s. Iagudiil had an uneventful career in the 1840s, alternating between periods in commission and in reserve. She participated in the early operations of the Black Sea Fleet during the Crimean War in October 1853, but her poor condition kept her from seeing action at the Battle of Sinop. The French and British intervention after Sinop led to the Russian retreat to Sevastopol, which was then besieged from 1854 to 1855. During the siege, Iagudiil battled French and British field artillery. After the Russian defenders were defeated in August 1855, they burned the ship to prevent it from being captured by the British and French, and the wreck was later demolished in 1857.

== Design ==
The eight Sultan Makhmud-class ships of the line were ordered as part of a naval expansion program aimed at strengthening the Russian Black Sea Fleet during a period of increased tension with Britain and France over the decline of one of Russia's traditional enemies, the Ottoman Empire. Beginning in the 1830s, Russia ordered a series of 84-gun ships in anticipation of a future conflict, and the Sultan Makhmuds accounted for nearly half of the nineteen vessels built.

Iagudiil was 197 feet 4 inches (60.15 m) long, with a beam of 52 ft (16 m) and a draft of 23 ft 8 in (7.21 m) to 26 ft 7 in (8.10 m). She displaced 3,790 metric tons (3,730 long tons; 4,180 short tons) and measured 2,500 tons burthen. The ship was built with a round stern to increase its strength.

The ship carried a battery of twenty-six 36-pounder long guns on the lower gun deck and another thirty-two 36-pound short-barreled guns on the upper gun deck. In her forecastle and quarterdeck, she mounted twenty 24-pound gunnades and two 24-pound carronades, seven 18-pound carronades, two 12-pound carronades, and two 8-pound carronades. In 1853, all of the carronades were removed from the ship, leaving just the gunnades, and the next year six 18-pound short-barreled guns were added.

== Service history ==
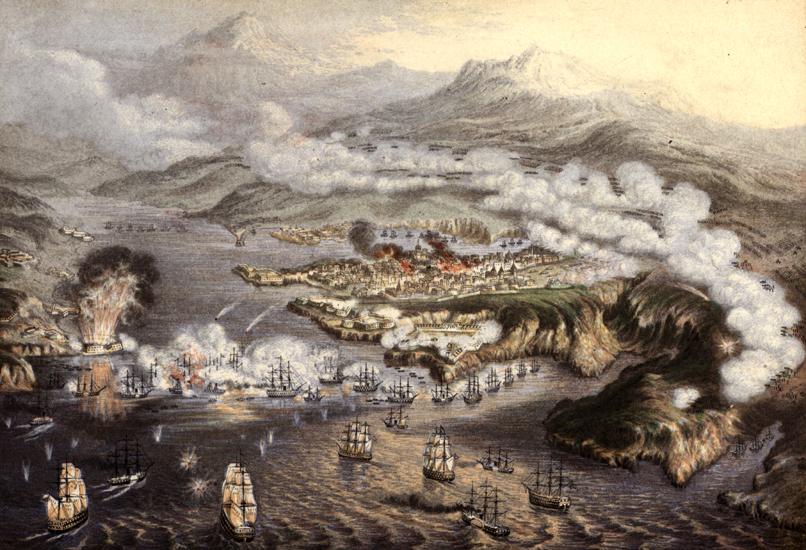
Illustration of the Siege of Sevastopol by George Baxter; Iagudiil and the rest of the Black Sea Fleet are trapped in the city in the background

Iagudiill was laid down at the I. S. Dimitriev shipyard in Nikolaev on 21 September 1839 (O.S.). She was launched on 17 September 1843 and she sailed to Sevastopol the next year for fitting-out. She thereafter operated with the Black Sea Fleet through 1845, when most of the vessels of the fleet, including Iagudiil and her sister ships, were laid up. She saw limited service for the rest of the decade, being recommissioned in 1847 and 1849, before returning to service on a permanent basis in 1851. She operated in the Black Sea for the next two years as tensions with the Ottoman Empire rose, eventually culminating in the start of the Crimean War in October 1853. That month, she participated in a campaign to transport elements of the Imperial Russian Army to the Caucasus to strengthen the forces there, and Iagudiil carried 947 soldiers to Sukhumi.

The ship's leaky hull prevented her from joining Vice Admiral Pavel Nakhimov's squadron that destroyed an Ottoman squadron at the Battle of Sinop in November, and instead she remained in Sevastopol. The Russian attack on Sinop was perceived in Britain and France as an attack on Ottoman territory, and thus provided the pro-war factions of their governments justification to intervene in the Crimean War. France and Britain issued an ultimatum to Russia to withdraw its forces from Rumelia, the Ottoman territories in the Balkans, which the Russians initially ignored, prompting Anglo-French declarations of war in March 1854. The Russians were surprised by the intervention and withdrew the fleet to Sevastopol, precluding any possibility of action with the British and French fleet that entered the Black Sea.

Iagudiil took an active role in the city's defense during the Siege of Sevastopol, engaging in artillery duels with Anglo-French field artillery batteries in October 1854. Following the collapse of the Russian garrison on 28 August 1855 in the aftermath of the Battle of Malakoff the day before, the retreating Russian soldiers set fire to Iagudiil to prevent her from being seized by the British and French. Her burned out hulk was later demolished with explosives in 1857.
