= Russian ship Trekh Ierarkhov (1838) =

Ship of the line of the Russian Imperial Navy

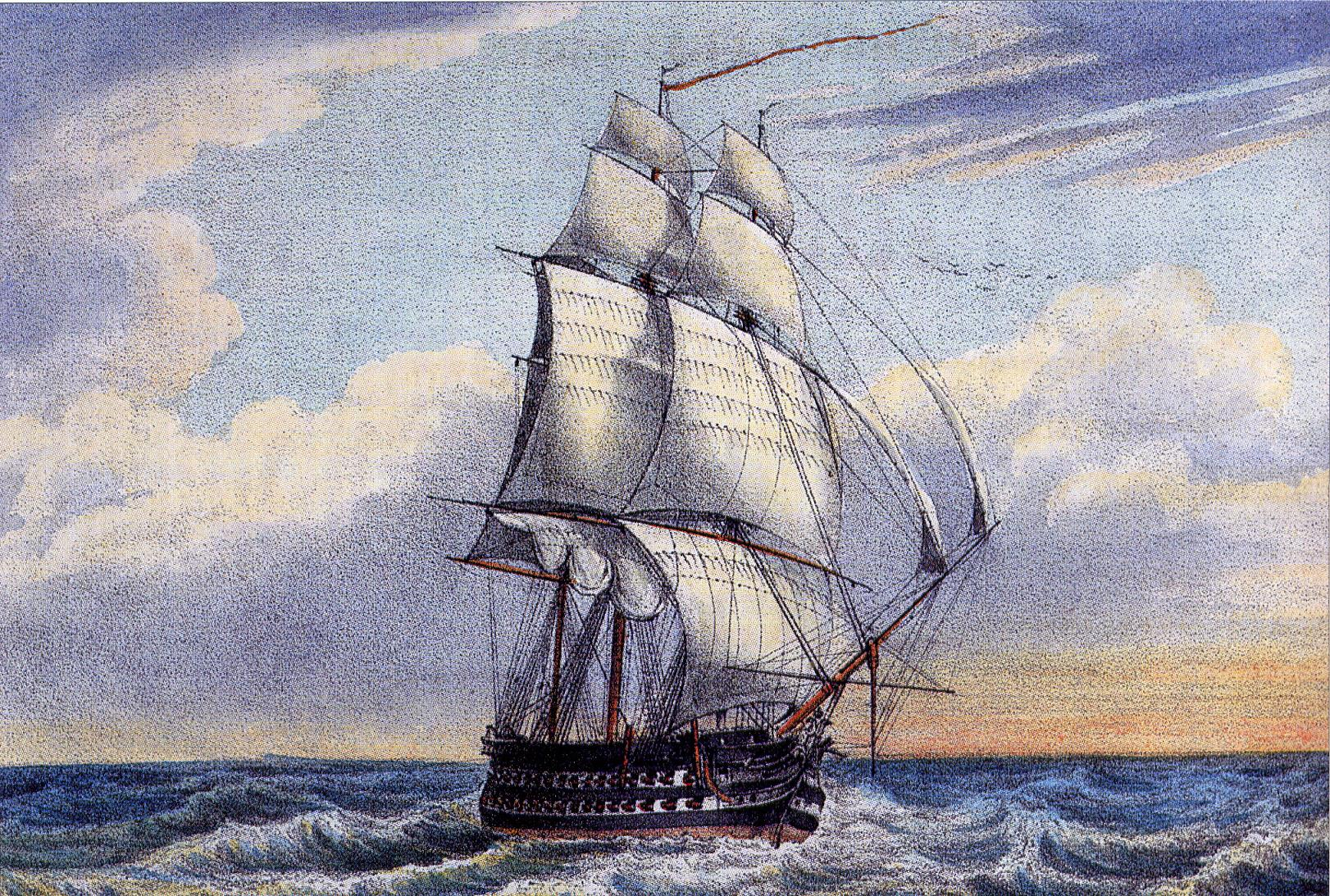
- Painting of Trekh Ierarkhov's sister ship Sultan Makhmud under sail

History

Russian Empire
- Name: Trekh Ierarkhov
- Builder: S. I. Chernyavskiy, Nikolaev
- Laid down: 19 November 1835
- Launched: 28 August 1838
- Fate: Broken up, 1854

General characteristics
- Class & type: Sultan Makhmud-class ship of the line
- Displacement: 3,790 metric tons (3,730 long tons; 4,180 short tons)
- Length: 196 ft (60 m)
- Beam: 53 ft 6 in (16.31 m)
- Draft: 26 ft 7 in (8.10 m)
- Armament: 28 × 36-pound long guns; 32 × 36-pound short guns; 6 × 18-pound guns; 16 × 36-pound carronades; 2 × 24-pound carronades; 1 × 12-pound carronade; 2 × 8-pound carronades

Trekh Ierarkhov was a Sultan Makhmud-class ship of the line built for the Imperial Russian Navy's Black Sea Fleet in the late 1830s. The ship had a relatively uneventful career, frequently being used as a troop transport including during campaigns in the Caucasus in the early 1840s to suppress unrest in the recently conquered territory. She saw little activity after being laid up in 1845; considered for conversion to steam power in 1852, she was instead broken up in 1854 due to her poor condition and the lack of funds during the Crimean War.

== Design ==
The eight Sultan Makhmud-class ships of the line were ordered as part of a naval expansion program aimed at strengthening the Russian Black Sea Fleet during a period of increased tension with Britain and France over the decline of one of Russia's traditional enemies, the Ottoman Empire. Beginning in the 1830s, Russia ordered a series of 84-gun ships in anticipation of a future conflict, and the Sultan Makhmuds accounted for nearly half of the nineteen vessels built.

Trekh Ierarkhov was 196 feet (60 m) long, with a beam of 53 ft 6 in (16.31 m) and a draft of 23 ft 8 in (7.21 m) to 26 ft 7 in (8.10 m). She displaced 3,790 metric tons (3,730 long tons; 4,180 short tons) and measured 2,500 tons burthen. The ship was built with a round stern to increase its strength.

The ship carried a battery of twenty-six 36-pounder long guns on the lower gun deck and another thirty-two 36-pound short-barreled guns on the upper gun deck. In her forecastle and quarterdeck, she mounted six 18-pound gunnades and twenty 36-pound carronades.

== Service history ==
The keel for Trekh Ierarkhov was laid down at the S. I. Chernyavskiy shipyard in Nikolaev on 19 November 1836. She was launched on 28 August 1838 and was completed by 1839 when she sailed to Sevastopol. In September that year, she received her armament and then began sea trials; From 1840 to 1841, Trekh Ierarkhov participated in a lengthy operation to transport Imperial Russian Army troops to newly conquered fortifications in the Caucasus area that had been seized during the Russo-Turkish War of 1828–1829. During this period, the former Ottoman subjects revolted against Russian rule, and the soldiers were needed to suppress the restive population.

Trekh Ierarkhov remained in active service with the fleet for the next several years, and in 1843, she assisted with the transport of the 13th Division from Sevastopol to Odessa and back. The ship was laid up in 1845 and was reactivated in 1847 to once again to help carry the 13th Division to Odessa and back. Laid up again in 1848, she returned to active service in 1849 to patrol the Black Sea. She was repaired in 1852 and considered for conversion into a steam-powered ship, but her poor condition by 1854 and the lack of funds in the midst of the Crimean War led to her being dismantled that year.
