= Russian ship Varna =

Ship of the line of the Russian Imperial Navy

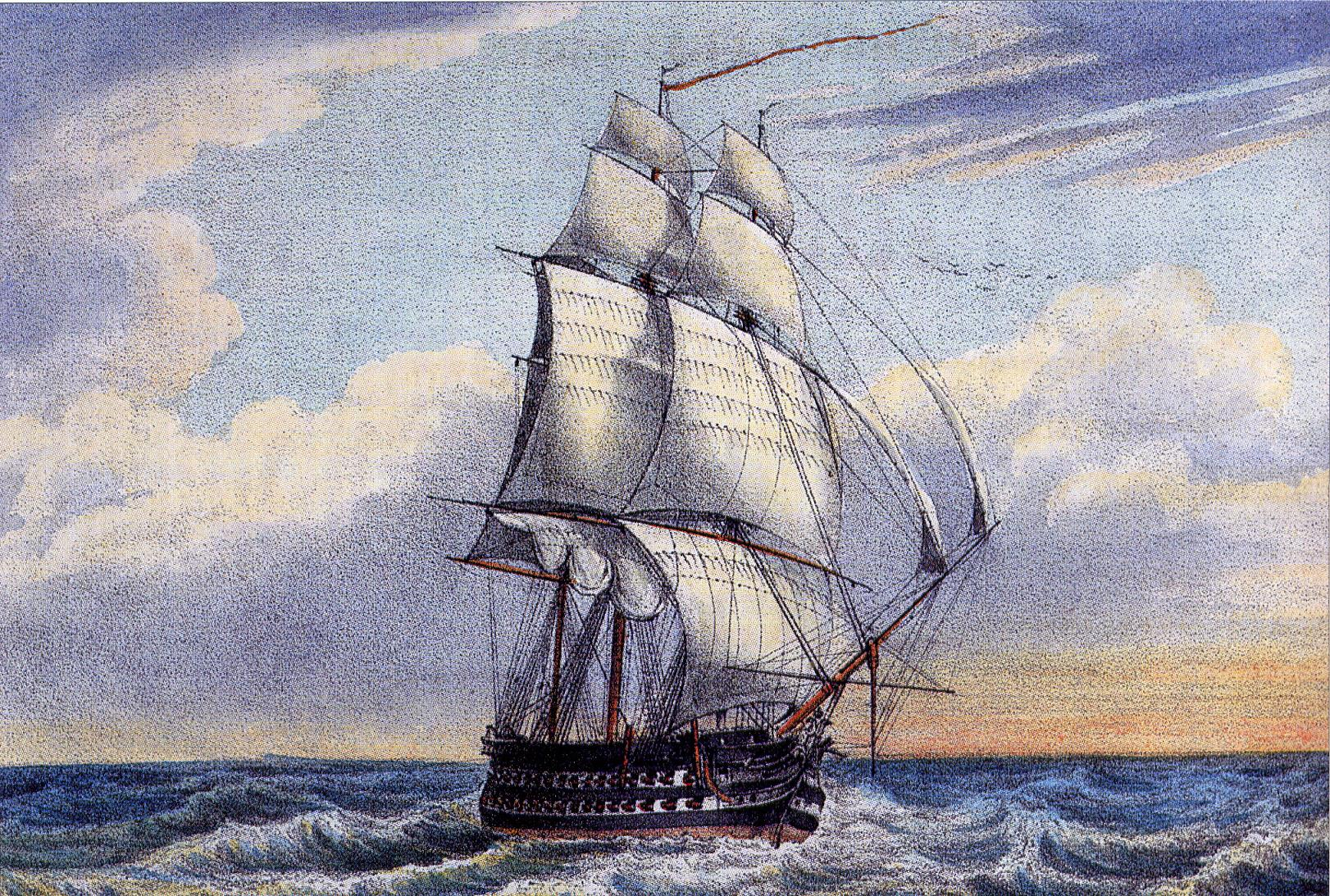
- Painting of Varna's sister ship Sultan Makhmud under sail

History

Russian Empire
- Name: Varna
- Builder: I. D. Vorobyov, Nikolaev
- Laid down: 4 October 1838
- Launched: 26 July 1842
- Fate: Scuttled, 11 September 1854

General characteristics
- Class & type: Sultan Makhmud-class ship of the line
- Displacement: 3,790 metric tons (3,730 long tons; 4,180 short tons)
- Length: 196 ft (60 m)
- Beam: 53 ft 6 in (16.31 m)
- Draft: 26 ft 7 in (8.10 m)
- Armament: 26 × 36-pound long guns; 32 × 36-pound short guns; 20 × 24-pound gunnades; 2 × 24 -pound carronades; 6 × 18-pound carronades; 2 × 12-pound carronades; 2 × 8-pound carronades

Varna was a Sultan Makhmud-class ship of the line built for the Imperial Russian Navy's Black Sea Fleet in the late 1830s and early 1840s. The ship had an uneventful career, apart from routine peacetime operations in the 1840s, interrupted by periods in reserve. In October 1853, she helped carry soldiers to the Caucasus to strengthen the Russian position there at the start of the Crimean War. In need of repairs, she was unable to take part in the Battle of Sinop in November, and thereafter remained in Sevastopol during the siege of the city. Her crew was sent ashore to reinforce the defenses and Varna was scuttled as a blockship in 1854 to bar the harbor entrance to French and British warships.

== Design ==
The eight Sultan Makhmud-class ships of the line were ordered as part of a naval expansion program aimed at strengthening the Russian Black Sea Fleet during a period of increased tension with Britain and France over the decline of one of Russia's traditional enemies, the Ottoman Empire. Beginning in the 1830s, Russia ordered a series of 84-gun ships in anticipation of a future conflict, and the Sultan Makhmuds accounted for nearly half of the nineteen vessels built.

Varna was 197 feet 4 inches (60.15 m) long, with a beam of 52 ft (16 m) and a draft of 23 ft 8 in (7.21 m) to 26 ft 7 in (8.10 m). She displaced 3,790 metric tons (3,730 long tons; 4,180 short tons) and measured 2,500 tons burthen. The ship was built with a round stern to increase its strength.

The ship carried a battery of twenty-six 36-pounder long guns on the lower gun deck and another thirty-two 36-pound short-barreled guns on the upper gun deck. In her forecastle and quarterdeck, she mounted twenty 24-pound gunnades and two 24-pound carronades, six 18-pound carronades, two 12-pound carronades, and two 8-pound carronades. In 1853, all of the carronades were removed from the ship, leaving just the gunnades, and the next year six 18-pound short-barreled guns were added.

== Service history ==
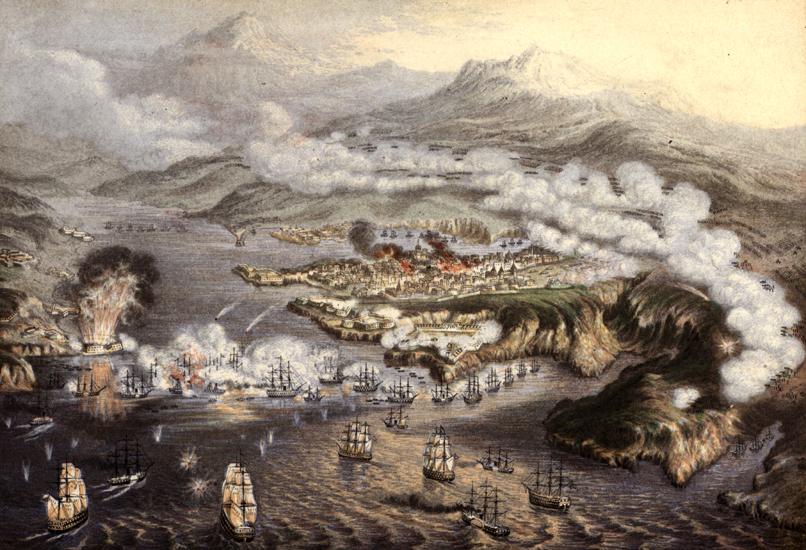
Illustration of the Siege of Sevastopol by George Baxter; Varna and the rest of the Black Sea Fleet are trapped in the city in the background

Varna was built by the I. D. Vorobyov shipyard in Nikolaev; her keel was laid down on 4 October 1838 and she was launched on 26 July 1842. Named for the Siege of Varna of the Russo-Turkish War of 1828, the ship sailed to Sevastopol in 1843 to be fitted-out. She helped to carry the 13th Division of the Imperial Russian Army from Sevastopol to Odessa and then back later that year. Varna remained in active service with the Black Sea Fleet for the next two years before being laid up in 1846; she was reactivated from 1847 to 1849 before being taken out of service again. She was recommissioned in 1852. In October 1853, after the Crimean War broke out with the Ottoman Empire, she took part in an operation to carry soldiers to the Caucasus to strengthen the Russian Army on there; she carried a contingent of 910 from Sevastopol to Sukhumi.

Varna underwent repairs at Sevastopol from late 1853 to 1854 and was therefore unavailable to join the Russian squadron under Vice Admiral Pavel Nakhimov that destroyed an Ottoman squadron at the Battle of Sinop. The Russian attack on Sinop was perceived in Britain and France as an attack on Ottoman territory, and thus provided the pro-war factions of their governments justification to intervene in the Crimean War. France and Britain issued an ultimatum to Russia to withdraw its forces from Rumelia, the Ottoman territories in the Balkans, which the Russians initially ignored, prompting Anglo-French declarations of war in March 1854. The Russians were surprised by the intervention and withdrew the fleet to Sevastopol, precluding any possibility of action with the British and French fleet that entered the Black Sea. After completing repairs, Varna was based in the Sevastopol roadstead to help defend the city, and she was scuttled there on 11 September 1854 as a block ship to prevent the Anglo-French fleet from entering the harbor.
