= Russian ship Sviatoslav (1845) =

Ship of the line of the Russian Imperial Navy

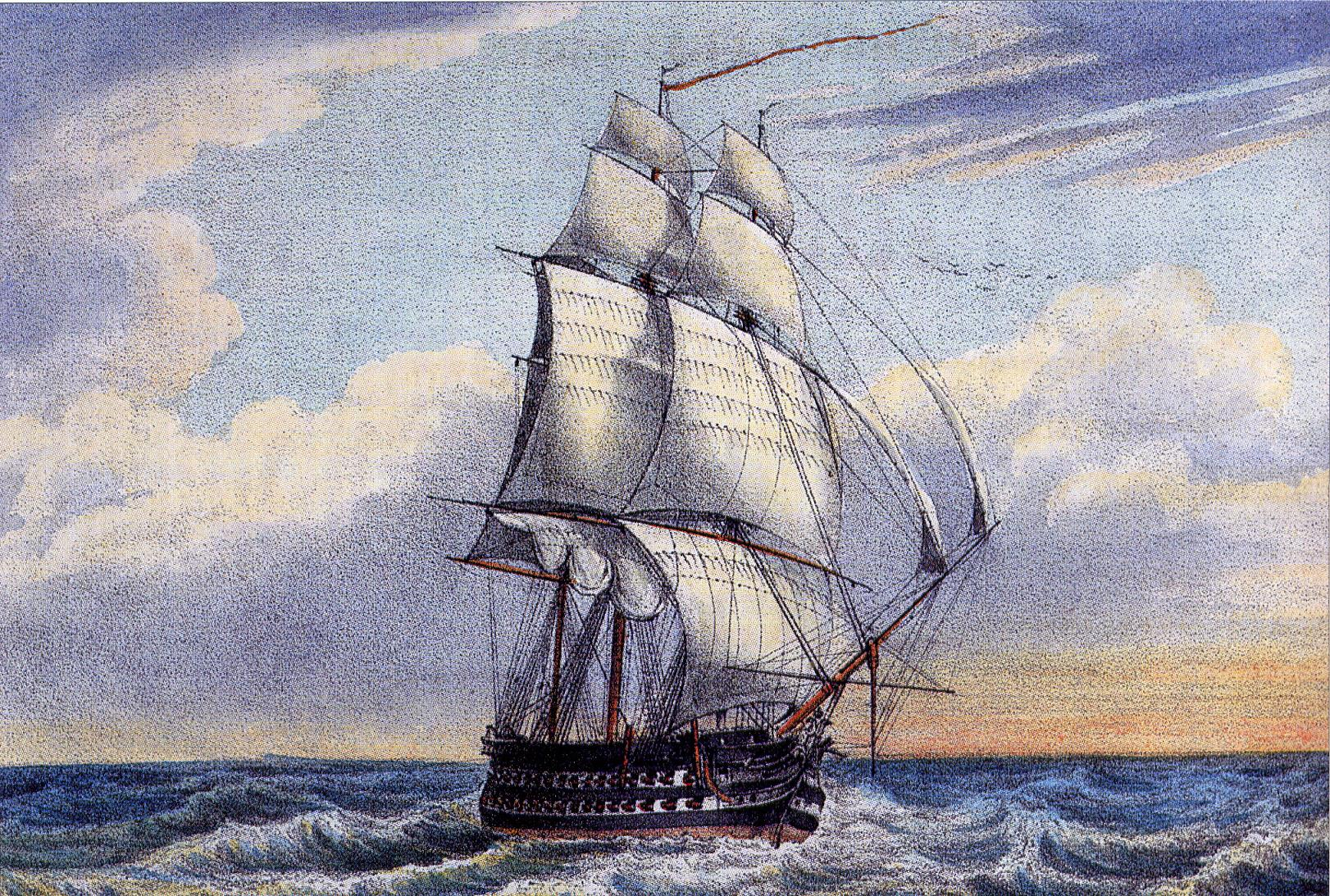
- Painting of Sviatoslav's sister ship Sultan Makhmud under sail

History

Russian Empire
- Name: Sviatoslav
- Builder: I. S. Dimitriev, Nikolaev
- Laid down: 16 May 1843
- Launched: 7 November 1845
- Fate: Scuttled, 13 February 1855

General characteristics
- Class & type: Sultan Makhmud-class ship of the line
- Displacement: 3,790 metric tons (3,730 long tons; 4,180 short tons)
- Length: 196 ft (60 m)
- Beam: 53 ft 6 in (16.31 m)
- Draft: 26 ft 7 in (8.10 m)
- Armament: 4 × 68-pound Paixhans guns; 28 × 36-pound long guns; 32 × 36-pound short guns; 20 × 24-pound gunnades; 2 × 24 -pound carronades; 8 × 18-pound carronades; 1 × 12-pound carronade; 3 × 8-pound carronades

Sviatoslav was a Sultan Makhmud-class ship of the line built for the Imperial Russian Navy's Black Sea Fleet in the 1840s. The ship participated in the Crimean War in 1853–1855, beginning with an operation to carry reinforcements for the Imperial Russian Army stationed in the Caucasus in October 1853. Storm damage prevented her from taking part in the Battle of Sinop the next month, but the British and French intervention in the war after that battle led ultimately to Sviatoslav's loss. The Russian fleet withdrew to Sevastopol to avoid battle with the Anglo-French fleet, and during the ensuing Siege of Sevastopol, she was converted into a hospital ship and eventually scuttled in February 1855.

== Design ==
The eight Sultan Makhmud-class ships of the line were ordered as part of a naval expansion program aimed at strengthening the Russian Black Sea Fleet during a period of increased tension with Britain and France over the decline of one of Russia's traditional enemies, the Ottoman Empire. Beginning in the 1830s, Russia ordered a series of 84-gun ships in anticipation of a future conflict, and the Sultan Makhmuds accounted for nearly half of the nineteen vessels built.

Sviatoslav was 197 feet 4 inches (60.15 m) long, with a beam of 52 ft (16 m) and a draft of 23 ft 8 in (7.21 m) to 26 ft 7 in (8.10 m). She displaced 3,790 metric tons (3,730 long tons; 4,180 short tons) and measured 2,500 tons burthen. The ship was built with a round stern to increase its strength.

The ship carried a heavier armament than her earlier sister ships; as the last member of the class, by the time Sviatoslav began construction Russia had started to manufacture shell-firing Paixhans guns. She received four of these 68-pound guns in addition to the standard battery of twenty-eight 36-pounder long guns on the lower gun deck and thirty-two 36-pound short-barreled guns on the upper gun deck. In her forecastle and quarterdeck, she mounted twenty 24-pound gunnades and two 24-pound carronades, eight 18-pound carronades, one 12-pound carronade, and three 8-pound carronades. In 1853, all of the carronades were removed from the ship, leaving just the gunnades, and the next year six 18-pound short-barreled guns were added.

== Service history ==
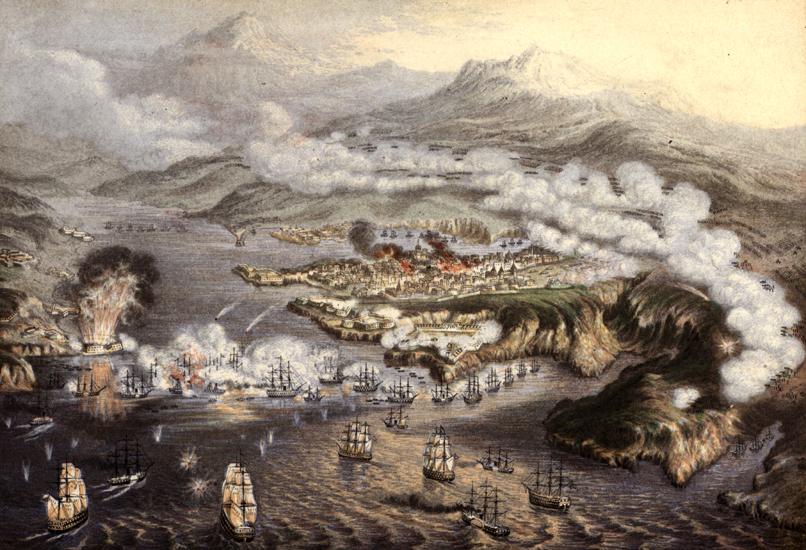
Illustration of the Siege of Sevastopol by George Baxter; Sviatoslav and the rest of the Black Sea Fleet are trapped in the city in the background

The keel for Sviatoslav was laid down on 16 May 1843 at the I. S. Dimitriev shipyard in Nikolaev. She was launched on 7 November 1845 and moved to the naval base at Sevastopol in 1846 to be fitted-out. She operated intermittently with the rest of the fleet for the next several years, with periods of active service interspersed with periods laid up in reserve. She was commissioned for service in 1847, 1849, and again in 1852, from then remaining in service until the outbreak of the Crimean War with the Ottoman Empire in October 1853. That month, she participated in a campaign to transport elements of the Imperial Russian Army to the Caucasus to strengthen the forces there, and Iagudiil carried 935 soldiers to Sukhumi.

Sviatoslav served with the squadron commanded by Vice Admiral Pavel Nakhimov into November, but she was badly damaged by severe weather and as a result, was unable to join the rest of the ships for the Battle of Sinop later that month. There, Nakhimov's ships annihilated an Ottoman squadron, which was perceived in Britain and France as an attack on Ottoman territory, and thus provided the pro-war factions of their governments justification to intervene in the Crimean War. France and Britain issued an ultimatum to Russia to withdraw its forces from Rumelia, the Ottoman territories in the Balkans, which the Russians initially ignored, prompting Anglo-French declarations of war in March 1854. The Russians were surprised by the intervention and withdrew the fleet to Sevastopol, precluding any possibility of action with the British and French fleet that entered the Black Sea.

After undergoing repairs, Sviatoslav was stationed in the Sevastopol roadstead in 1854, and her crew was temporarily sent ashore to assist in the construction of an 17-gun artillery battery to strengthen the city's defenses during the Siege of Sevastopol. On 18 December, the vessel was converted into a hospital ship to help shoulder the burden of treating the garrison's casualties. She was ultimately scuttled in the harbor on 13 February 1855.
