= Russian ship Selafail (1840) =

Ship of the line of the Russian Imperial Navy

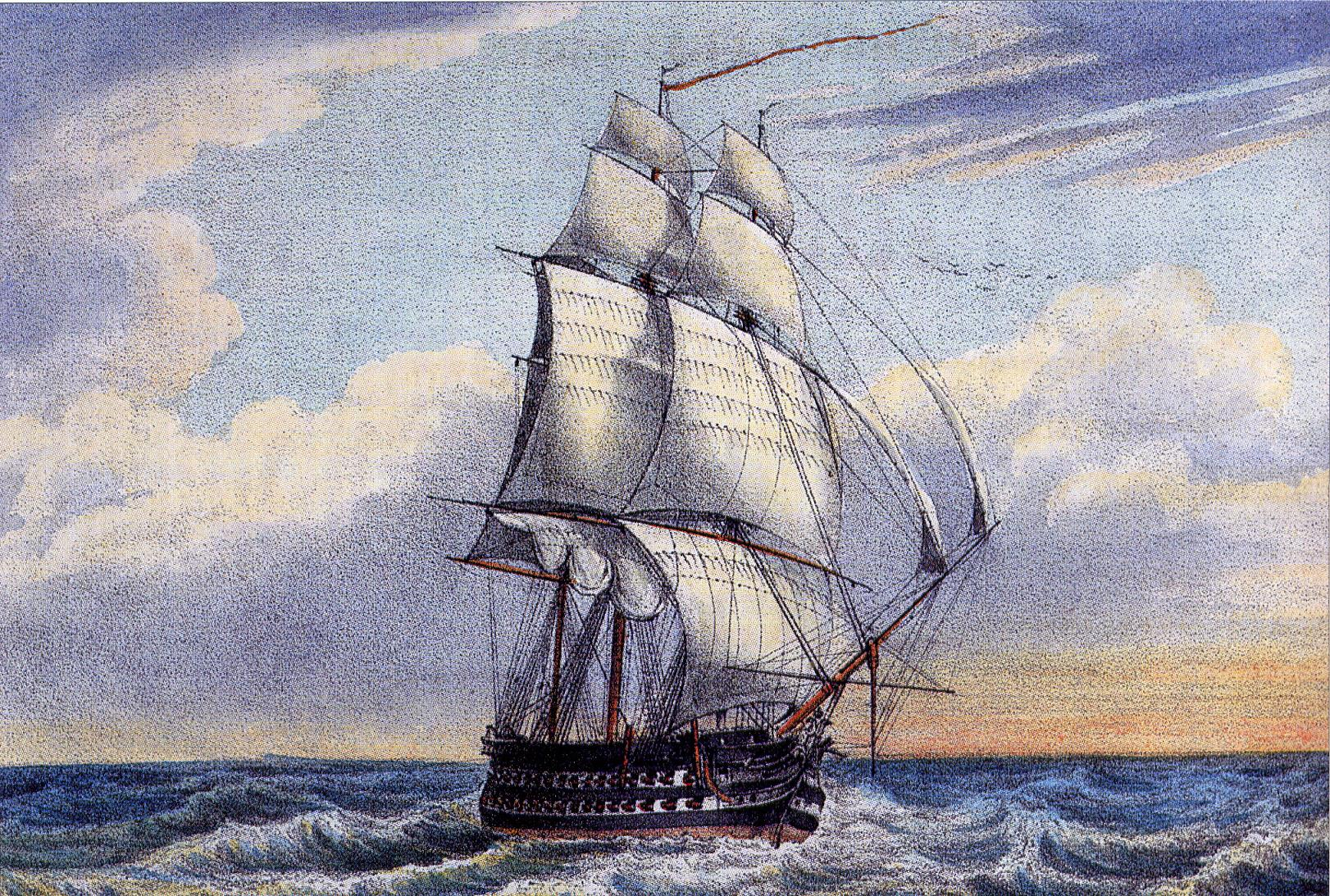
- Painting of Selafail's sister ship Sultan Makhmud under sail

History

Russian Empire
- Name: Selafail
- Builder: V. Apostoli, Nikolaev
- Laid down: 28 August 1838
- Launched: 10 July 1840
- Fate: Scuttled, 11 September 1854

General characteristics
- Class & type: Sultan Makhmud-class ship of the line
- Displacement: 3,790 metric tons (3,730 long tons; 4,180 short tons)
- Length: 196 ft (60 m)
- Beam: 53 ft 6 in (16.31 m)
- Draft: 26 ft 7 in (8.10 m)
- Armament: 26 × 36-pound long guns; 32 × 36-pound short guns; 8 × 18-pound guns; 10 × 36-pound carronades; 2 × 24-pound carronades; 2 × 12-pound carronades; 2 × 8-pound carronades

Selafail was a Sultan Makhmud-class ship of the line built for the Imperial Russian Navy's Black Sea Fleet in the late 1830s and early 1840s. The ship had a relatively uneventful career, operating with the Black Sea Fleet in the early 1840s before being laid up in 1845; apart from brief periods of activity in 1847 and 1849, she remained out of service until 1852. After the outbreak of the Crimean War in October 1853, she was slated to join a squadron commanded by Pavel Nakhimov, but storm damage prevented her from taking part in the Battle of Sinop. The ship was eventually scuttled as a blockship in 1854 during the Siege of Sevastopol.

== Design ==
The eight Sultan Makhmud-class ships of the line were ordered as part of a naval expansion program aimed at strengthening the Russian Black Sea Fleet during a period of increased tension with Britain and France over the decline of one of Russia's traditional enemies, the Ottoman Empire. Beginning in the 1830s, Russia ordered a series of 84-gun ships in anticipation of a future conflict, and the Sultan Makhmuds accounted for nearly half of the nineteen vessels built.

Selafail was 197 feet 4 inches (60.15 m) long, with a beam of 52 ft (16 m) and a draft of 23 ft 8 in (7.21 m) to 26 ft 7 in (8.10 m). She displaced 3,790 metric tons (3,730 long tons; 4,180 short tons) and measured 2,500 tons burthen. The ship was built with a round stern to increase its strength.

The ship carried a battery of twenty-six 36-pounder long guns on the lower gun deck and another thirty-two 36-pound short-barreled guns on the upper gun deck. In her forecastle and quarterdeck, she mounted six 18-pound gunnades and ten 36-pound carronades, two 24-pound carronades, two 12-pound carronades, and two 8-pound carronades. In 1853, all of the lighter carronades were removed from the ship, leaving just the 36-pound carronades, and the next year the 18-pound guns were replaced with an identical number of 18-pound gunnades, ten more 36-pound carronades were installed, and another six 18-pound short-barreled guns were added.

== Service history ==
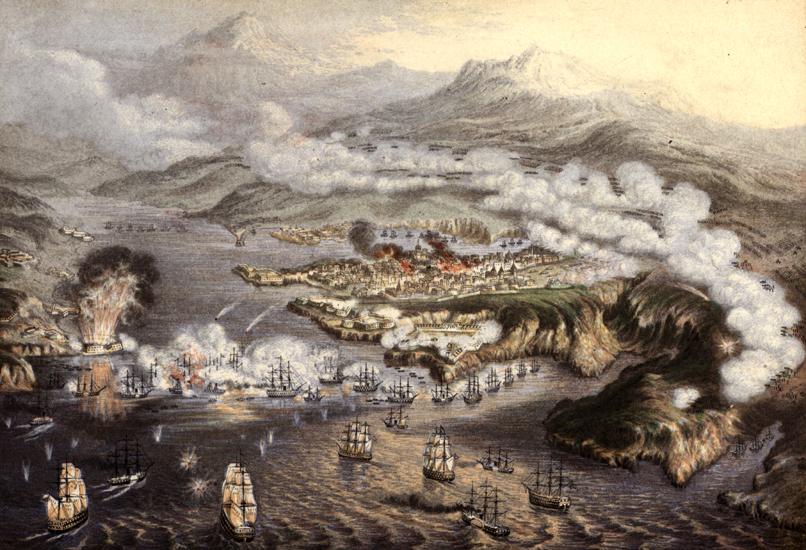
Illustration of the Siege of Sevastopol by George Baxter; Selafail and the rest of the Black Sea Fleet are trapped in the city in the background

Selafail was laid down on 28 August 1838 at the V. Apostoli shipyard in Nikolaev and was launched on 10 July 1840. She sailed to the naval base at Sevastopol in 1841 and operated with the Black Sea Fleet in 1842. The next year, she helped to carry the 13th Division from Sevastopol to Odessa and then back to Sevastopol. She operated with the fleet though 1845, when she was laid up with most of the rest of the fleet, spending much of the rest of the decade in reserve. She was reactivated briefly in 1847 and 1849 before returning to service on a more permanent basis in 1852. The next year, she carried the 13th Division from Odessa to Sevastopol as tensions with the Ottoman Empire began to rise. After the outbreak of the Crimean War with the Ottomans in October 1853, she was to join a squadron commanded by Vice Admiral Pavel Nakhimov, but storm damage in November that caused a leak in her hull prevented her from taking part in the Battle of Sinop, where Nakhimov destroyed an Ottoman squadron.

The Russian attack on Sinop was perceived in Britain and France as an attack on Ottoman territory, and thus provided the pro-war factions of their governments justification to intervene in the Crimean War. France and Britain issued an ultimatum to Russia to withdraw its forces from Rumelia, the Ottoman territories in the Balkans, which the Russians initially ignored, prompting Anglo-French declarations of war in March 1854. The Russians were surprised by the intervention and withdrew the fleet to Sevastopol, precluding any possibility of action with the British and French fleet that entered the Black Sea. Selafail was stationed in the roadstead outside Sevastopol in 1854 and was scuttled there on 11 September 1854 as a blockship to prevent the Anglo-French fleet from entering the port during the Siege of Sevastopol.
