= Russian ship Sviatoslav =

Four ships of the Imperial Russian Navy have been named Sviatoslav:

- Russian ship Sviatoslav (1769), 80-gun ship of the Sviatoi Pavel class
- Russian ship Sviatoslav (1781), 66-gun ship of the Azia class
- Russian ship Sviatoslav (1809), 74-gun ship of the Selafail class
- Russian ship Sviatoslav (1845), 84-gun ship of the Sultan Makhmud class
