= Russian ship Uriil (1840) =

Ship of the line of the Russian Imperial Navy

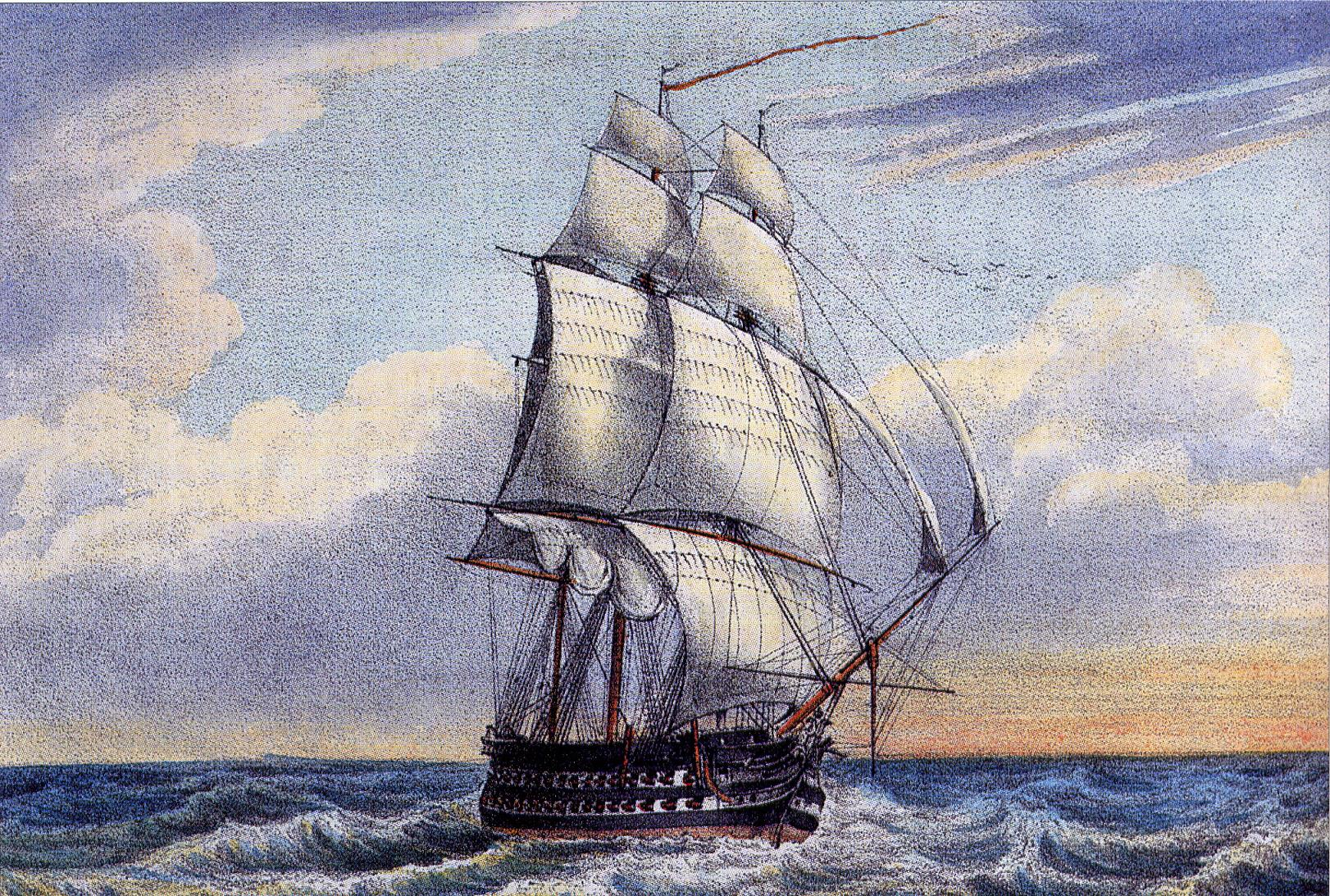
- Painting of Uriil's sister ship Sultan Makhmud under sail

History

Russian Empire
- Name: Uriil
- Builder: A. S. Akimov, Nikolaev
- Laid down: 28 August 1838
- Launched: 31 October 1840
- Fate: Scuttled, 11 September 1854

General characteristics
- Class & type: Sultan Makhmud-class ship of the line
- Displacement: 3,790 metric tons (3,730 long tons; 4,180 short tons)
- Length: 196 ft (60 m)
- Beam: 53 ft 6 in (16.31 m)
- Draft: 26 ft 7 in (8.10 m)
- Armament: 26 × 36-pound long guns; 32 × 36-pound short guns; 8 × 18-pound guns; 10 × 36-pound carronades; 2 × 24-pound carronades; 1 × 12-pound carronade; 2 × 8-pound carronades

Uriil was a Sultan Makhmud-class ship of the line built for the Imperial Russian Navy's Black Sea Fleet in the late 1830s and early 1840s. The ship had a relatively uneventful career, operating with the Black Sea Fleet in the early 1840s before being laid up in 1845; apart from brief periods of activity in 1847 and 1849, she remained out of service until 1852. After the outbreak of the Crimean War in October 1853, she joined a squadron commanded by Pavel Nakhimov, but was unable to participate in the Battle of Sinop after a storm opened leaks in her hull. In poor condition, she was removed from service and her crew was sent to help man shore batteries during the Siege of Sevastopol. Uriil was then scuttled to block the harbor entrance in 1854.

== Design ==
The eight Sultan Makhmud-class ships of the line were ordered as part of a naval expansion program aimed at strengthening the Russian Black Sea Fleet during a period of increased tension with Britain and France over the decline of one of Russia's traditional enemies, the Ottoman Empire. Beginning in the 1830s, Russia ordered a series of 84-gun ships in anticipation of a future conflict, and the Sultan Makhmuds accounted for nearly half of the nineteen vessels built.

Uriil was 197 feet 4 inches (60.15 m) long, with a beam of 52 ft (16 m) and a draft of 23 ft 8 in (7.21 m) to 26 ft 7 in (8.10 m). She displaced 3,790 metric tons (3,730 long tons; 4,180 short tons) and measured 2,500 tons burthen. The ship was built with a round stern to increase its strength.

The ship carried a battery of twenty-six 36-pounder long guns on the lower gun deck and another thirty-two 36-pound short-barreled guns on the upper gun deck. In her forecastle and quarterdeck, she mounted six 18-pound gunnades and ten 36-pound carronades, two 24-pound carronades, one 12-pound carronade, and two 8-pound carronades. In 1853, all of the lighter carronades were removed from the ship, leaving just the 36-pound carronades, and the next year the 18-pound guns were replaced with an identical number of 18-pound gunnades, ten more 36-pound carronades were installed, and another six 18-pound short-barreled guns were added.

== Service history ==
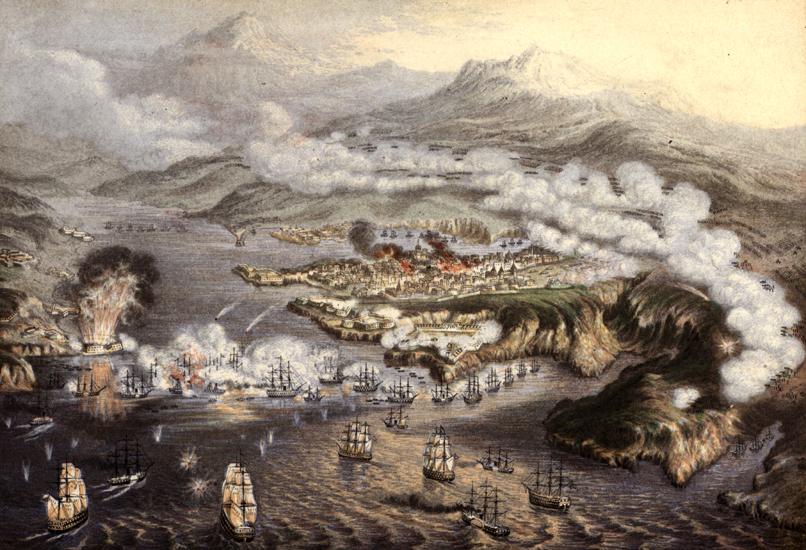
Illustration of the Siege of Sevastopol by George Baxter; Uriil and the rest of the Black Sea Fleet are trapped in the city in the background

The keel for Uriil was laid down on 28 August 1838 at the A. S. Akimov shipyard in Nikolaev. She was launched on 31 October 1840 and sailed to the naval base at Sevastopol in 1841 for fitting-out. The ship operated with the Black Sea Fleet in 1842, was laid up from 1843 to 1844 when she was reactivated for another period in commission that lasted through 1845. She remained in reserve for much of the next several years, seeing brief periods of active service in 1847 and 1849 before returning to service in 1852 during a period of increasing tension with the Ottoman Empire. In 1853, she assisted in the transport of the 13th Division of the Imperial Russian Army from Odessa to Sevastopol. After the outbreak of the Crimean War with the Ottoman Empire in October 1853, she joined a squadron commanded by Vice Admiral Pavel Nakhimov. She suffered significant storm damage in November which caused several leaks in her hull, preventing her from taking part in the Battle of Sinop, where Nakhimov annihilated a squadron of Ottoman frigates later that month.

The Russian attack on Sinop was perceived in Britain and France as an attack on Ottoman territory, and thus provided the pro-war factions of their governments justification to intervene in the Crimean War. France and Britain issued an ultimatum to Russia to withdraw its forces from Rumelia, the Ottoman territories in the Balkans, which the Russians initially ignored, prompting Anglo-French declarations of war in March 1854. The Russians were surprised by the intervention and withdrew the fleet to Sevastopol, precluding any possibility of action with the British and French fleet that entered the Black Sea. Since Uriil was in poor condition, she was taken to Sevastopol and her crew was dispersed among the gun crews for the city's shore batteries. She was then scuttled on 11 September 1854 as a blockship in the harbor entrance during the Siege of Sevastopol.
