= Russian ship Arkhangel Gavriil =

Ship of the line of the Russian Imperial Navy

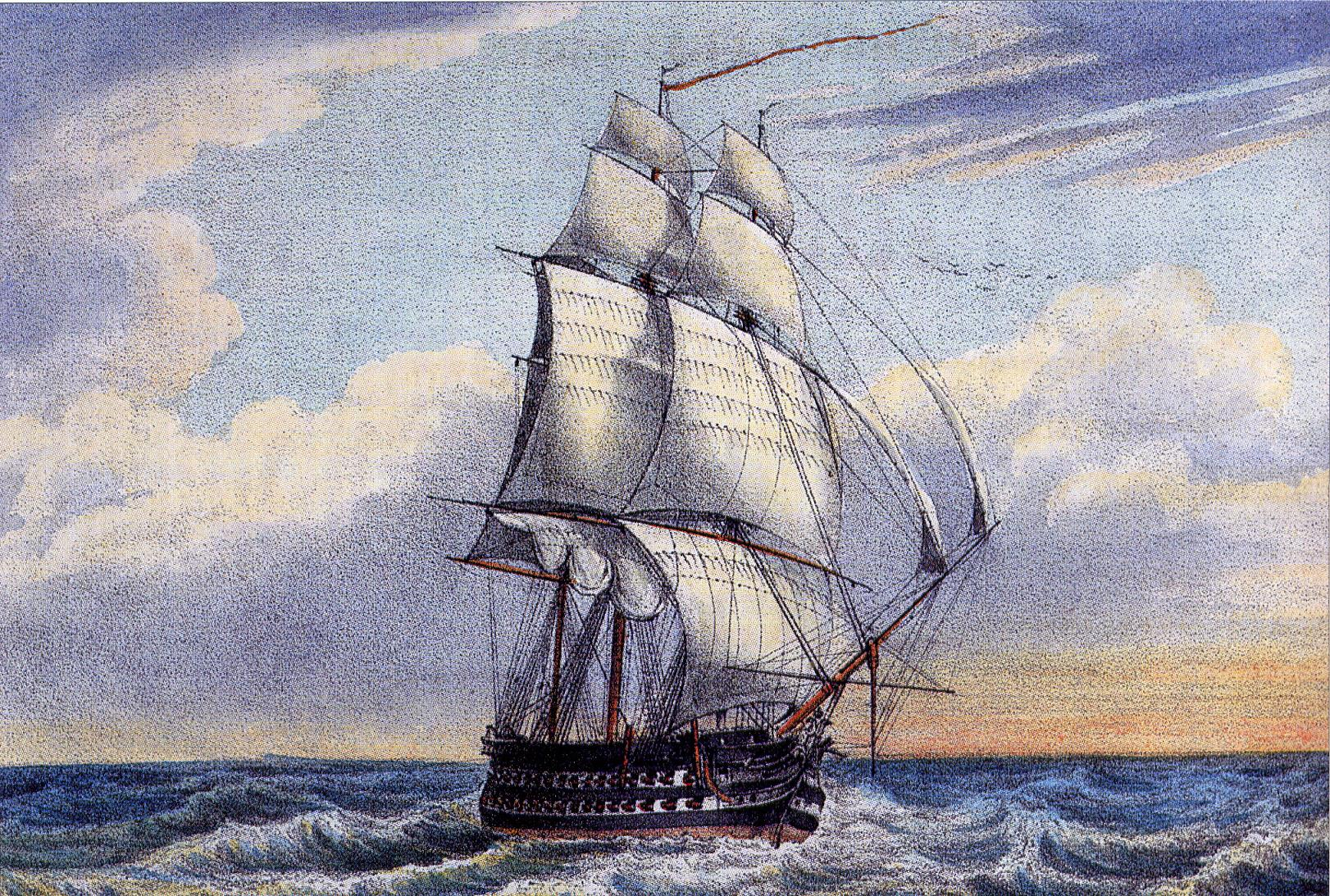
- Painting of Arkhangel Gavriil's sister ship Sultan Makhmud under sail

History

Russian Empire
- Name: Arkhangel Gavriil
- Builder: A. S. Akimov, Nikolaev
- Laid down: 28 August 1838
- Launched: 19 November 1839
- Fate: Scuttled, 11 September 1854

General characteristics
- Class & type: Sultan Makhmud-class ship of the line
- Displacement: 3,790 metric tons (3,730 long tons; 4,180 short tons)
- Length: 196 ft (60 m)
- Beam: 53 ft 6 in (16.31 m)
- Draft: 26 ft 7 in (8.10 m)
- Armament: 28 × 36-pound long guns; 32 × 36-pound short guns; 8 × 18-pound guns; 14 × 36-pound carronades; 1 × 24-pound carronade; 2 × 12-pound carronades; 2 × 8-pound carronades

Arkhangel Gavriil was a Sultan Makhmud-class ship of the line built for the Imperial Russian Navy's Black Sea Fleet in the late 1830s and early 1840s. The ship had a relatively uneventful career, frequently being used as a troop transport including during campaigns in the Caucasus in the early 1840s to suppress unrest in the recently conquered territory. She saw little activity after being laid up in 1845 and was repaired in late 1853, though she did not see action during the Crimean War and was instead scuttled in September 1854.

== Design ==
The eight Sultan Makhmud-class ships of the line were ordered as part of a naval expansion program aimed at strengthening the Russian Black Sea Fleet during a period of increased tension with Britain and France over the decline of one of Russia's traditional enemies, the Ottoman Empire. Beginning in the 1830s, Russia ordered a series of 84-gun ships in anticipation of a future conflict, and the Sultan Makhmuds accounted for nearly half of the nineteen vessels built.

Arkhangel Gavriil was 197 feet 4 inches (60.15 m) long, with a beam of 52 ft (16 m) and a draft of 23 ft 8 in (7.21 m) to 26 ft 7 in (8.10 m). She displaced 3,790 metric tons (3,730 long tons; 4,180 short tons) and measured 2,500 tons burthen. The ship was built with a round stern to increase its strength.

The ship carried a battery of twenty-eight 36-pounder long guns on the lower gun deck and another thirty-two 36-pounder short-barreled guns on the upper gun deck. In her forecastle and quarterdeck, she mounted six 18-pounder guns and fourteen 36-pounder carronades, one 24-pounder carronade, two 12-pounder carronades, and two 8-pounder carronades. In 1853, all of the lighter carronades were removed from the ship, leaving just the 36-pounder carronades, and the next year the 18-pounder guns were replaced with an identical number of 18-pounder gunnades and another six 18-pounder short-barreled guns were added.

== Service history ==
Built by the A. S. Askimov shipyard in Nikolaev, she was laid down on 28 August 1838 and was launched on 19 November 1839. She then sailed to Sevastopol in 1840 and later that year began her participation in a lengthy operation to transport Imperial Russian Army troops to newly conquered fortifications in the Caucasus area that had been seized during the Russo-Turkish War of 1828–1829. During this period, the former Ottoman subjects revolted against Russian rule, and the soldiers were needed to suppress the restive population. Russia considered intervening directly in the Egyptian–Ottoman War in September 1840, but Arkhangel Gavriil and several other ships were in need of repair; combined with troop shortages, the lack of sufficient forces led the Russians to decide against actively entering the conflict. The threat of Russian (and British) intervention nevertheless was used to pressure Muhammad Ali of Egypt.

Trekh Ierarkhov remained in active service with the fleet for the next several years, and in 1843, she assisted with the transport of the 13th Division from Sevastopol to Odessa and back. The ship was laid up in 1845 and spent most of the rest of the decade out of service. She was reactivated in 1847 to once again to help carry the 13th Division to Odessa and back, thereafter returning to reserve status until 1849, when she was again commissioned to patrol the Black Sea. Returning to reserve in 1850, she was briefly recalled to service in 1852 and underwent limited repairs in December 1853 after the Crimean War broke out. She saw no combat during the war and was ultimately scuttled on 11 September 1854 at Silistra.
