= Sultan Makhmud-class ship of the line =

Ship of the line class of the Russian Imperial Navy

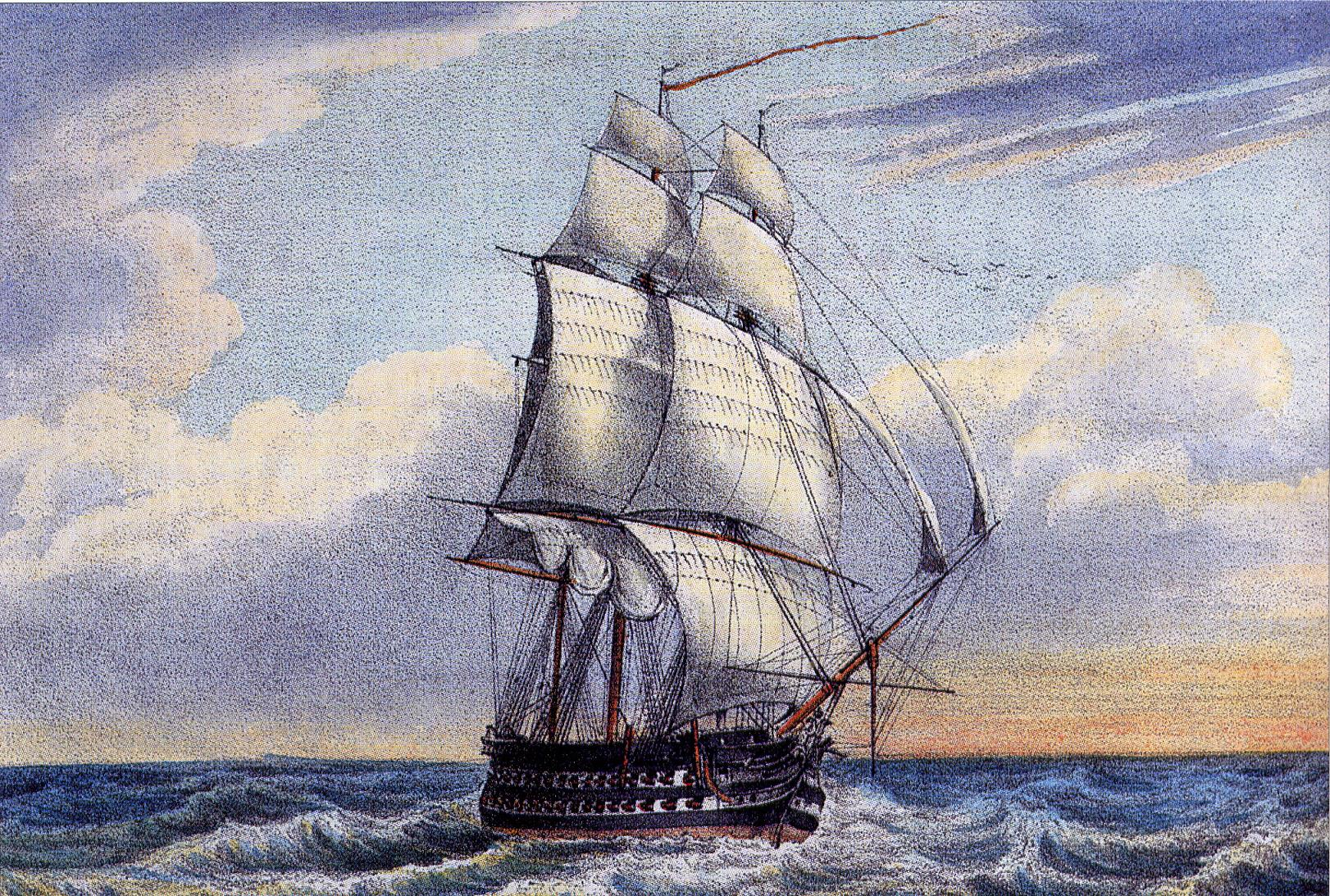
- Sultan Makhmud

Class overview
- Preceded by: Imperatritsa Maria class
- Succeeded by: Rostislav
- Completed: 8
- Lost: 6
- Scrapped: 2

General characteristics
- Type: Ship of the line
- Displacement: 3,790 metric tons (3,730 long tons; 4,180 short tons)
- Length: 196 ft (60 m)
- Beam: 53 ft 6 in (16.31 m)
- Draft: 26 ft 7 in (8.10 m)
- Armament: 28 × 36-pound long guns; 32 × 36-pound short guns; 6 × 18-pound guns; 16 × 36-pound carronades

The Sultan Makhmud class was a group of eight 84-gun ships of the line built for the Black Sea Fleet of the Imperial Russian Navy. The class comprised Sultan Makhmud, Trekh Ierarkhov, Arkhangel Gavriil, Selafail, Uriil, Varna, Iagudiil, and Sviatoslav. They were built as part of a naval expansion program directed against the British and French, which Russia viewed as competitors to fill the power vacuum left by the continued decline of the Ottoman Empire. The ships represented an improvement over the traditional seventy-four, as improved building techniques allowed naval designers to build larger, more heavily armed vessels without sacrificing the hull strength that had made the seventy-fours such effective warships.

The ships of the class had relatively uneventful careers; the first two vessels took part in campaigns in the Caucasus in the late 1830s and early 1840s to suppress rebels, and all of the ships saw active service patrolling the Black Sea in the 1840s. Sultan Makhmud and Trekh Ierarkhov were in poor condition by 1850 and the former was accordingly converted into a hulk while a steam-power conversion for the latter ultimately came to nothing. The other ships remained in service after the start of the Crimean War in October 1853, but none saw action at the Battle of Sinop that triggered British and French intervention and ultimately led to all of the ships' destruction during the Siege of Sevastopol in 1854 and 1855. Most of the vessels were scuttled as block ships, but Iagudiil remained in service until the Russian collapse, when she was destroyed by retreating Russian forces.

== Design ==
The Ottoman Empire had grown increasingly weak by the 1820s, particularly after a combined French, British, and Russian fleet annihilated an Ottoman fleet at the Battle of Navarino in 1827. The power vacuum increased tension with Britain and France over influence in the region, prompting Russian fears of a conflict with the other two Great Powers. At the time, the British and French navies began to move away from the traditional seventy-four as improved building techniques allowed them to design larger two-decked ships of the line armed with 84 guns while retaining the hull strength of the 74-gun ships. And at the same time, the navy of the Eyalet of Egypt also began to build a powerful fleet. To prepare itself for an anticipated future conflict involving the British, French, Egyptians, or Ottomans, Russia began a construction program in the 1830s to strengthen the Black Sea Fleet that included nine 84-gun ships; unlike the shallower Baltic Sea, ships built for the Black Sea could make use of the deeper draft needed for the larger eighty-fours. Following the three Imperatritsa Maria-class ships, the Russian Navy embarked on a larger program, resulting in the eight Sultan Makhmud-class ships.

=== Characteristics ===
The ships of the Sultan Makhmud class varied slightly in dimensions; they were 196 feet (60 m) to 197 ft 4 in (60.15 m) long, with a beam of 52 ft (16 m) to 53 ft 6 in (16.31 m) and a draft of 23 ft 8 in (7.21 m) to 26 ft 7 in (8.10 m). They displaced 3,790 metric tons (3,730 long tons; 4,180 short tons) and measured 2,500 tons burthen. The ships were built with a round stern to increase its strength.

The ships carried an armament that varied between members of the class and changed over time. Sultan Makhmud was armed with a battery of twenty-eight 36-pounder long guns on the lower gun deck and another thirty-two 36-pound short-barreled guns on the upper gun deck. Most of the other members of the class carried an identical battery in their lower and upper decks, though with just twenty-six guns in their lower deck, with the exception of Sviatoslav, which carried four 68-pound Paixhans guns in addition to twenty-eight of the 36-pounder guns.

The ships carried a wider range of lighter guns—primarily gunnades and carronades—in their forecastles and quarterdecks. Sultan Makhmud mounted six 18-pound guns and sixteen 36-pound carronades, while Trekh Ierarkhov received four additional 36-pound carronades. Arkhangel Gavriil instead carried six 18-pound guns, fourteen 36-pound carronades, one 24-pound carronade, two 12-pound carronades, and two 8-pound carronades. Selafail and Uriil mounted an almost identical light battery of six 18-pound gunnades, ten 36-pound carronades, two 24-pound carronades, two 12-pound carronades, and two 8-pound carronades, though Uriil received one less 12-pounder. Varna, Iagudiil, and Sviatoslav were also similarly armed, with twenty 24-pound gunnades, two 24-pound carronades, six 18-pound carronades (seven for Iagudiil and eight for Sviatoslav), two 12-pound carronades, and two 8-pound carronades.

== Ships ==
| Ship | Builder | Laid down | Launched |
|---|---|---|---|
| Sultan Makhmud | V. Apostoli, Nikolaev | 1 February 1835 | 31 October 1836 |
| Trekh Ierarkhov | S. I. Chernyavskiy, Nikolaev | 19 November 1835 | 28 August 1838 |
| Arkhangel Gavriil | A. S. Akimov, Nikolaev | 28 August 1838 | 19 November 1839 |
| Selafail | V. Apostoli, Nikolaev | 28 August 1838 | 10 July 1840 |
| Uriil | A. S. Akimov, Nikolaev | 28 August 1838 | 31 October 1840 |
| Varna | I. D. Vorobyov, Nikolaev | 4 October 1838 | 26 July 1842 |
| Iagudiil | I. S. Dimitriev, Nikolaev | 21 September 1839 | 17 September 1839 |
| Sviatoslav | I. S. Dimitriev, Nikolaev | 16 May 1843 | 7 November 1845 |

== Service history ==
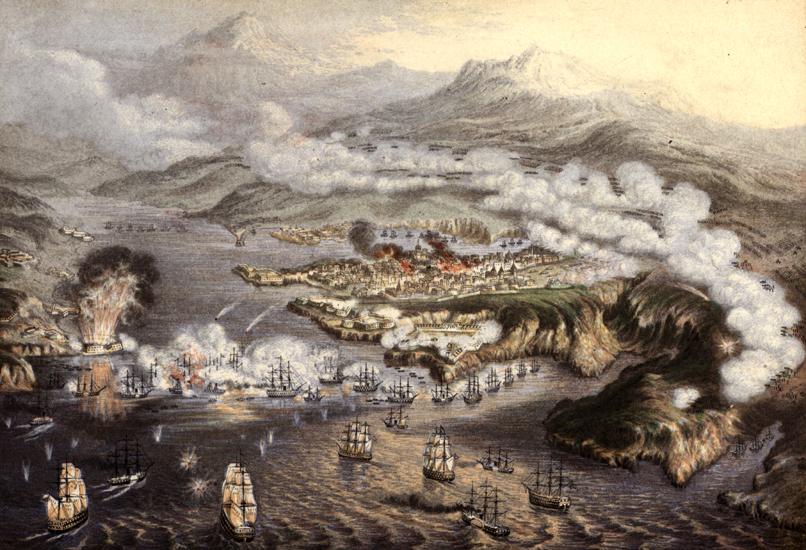
Illustration of the Siege of Sevastopol by George Baxter; the Sultan Makhmud class and the rest of the Black Sea Fleet are trapped in the city in the background

All eight ships of the class served with the Black Sea Fleet on entering service. Sultan Makhmud, Trekh Ierarkhov, and Arkhangel Gavriil took part in campaigns to suppress civil unrest Caucasus region in the eastern Black Sea, primarily as troop transports. Sultan Makhmud was involved in a bombardment of Sochi in 1839. In the early 1840s, the ships that had entered service patrolled the Black Sea and transported elements of the Imperial Russian Army to and from Sevastopol and Odessa. All eight ships were laid up in 1846 and were reactivated periodically through the early 1850s. In poor condition, Sultan Makhmud was hulked in 1850 and Trekh Ierarkhov was considered for rebuilding into a steam-powered ship of the line, but the plan was abandoned due to its cost.

In October 1853, the Crimean War broke out between Russia and the Ottoman Empire, and in the early stages of the conflict the ships still in active service were used to carry Russian soldiers to the Caucasus. Several of the vessels were to have joined Pavel Nakhimov's squadron that saw action at the Battle of Sinop in November, but storm damage to the vessels forced them to return to port for repairs. Despite none of the members of the class having taken part in the battle, the action nevertheless led to all of their ultimate demise, as pro-war parties in Britain and France used the attack on Sinop as justification to intervene on behalf of the Ottomans. A powerful Anglo-French fleet entered the Black Sea, and the Russians, who wished to avoid directly attacking British and French forces in favor of a negotiated settlement, withdrew the Black Sea Fleet to Sevastopol.

During the ensuing Siege of Sevastopol, Sultan Makhmud and Trekh Ierarkhov were both broken up in 1854, as the lack of funds due to the war prevented their repair. Many of the ships' crews were sent ashore to assist with the city's defense, and Sviatoslav was converted into a hospital ship. The surviving members of the class were ultimately either scuttled there as blockships in 1854 to prevent the British and French from entering the harbor, as was the case with Selafail, Uriil, Arkhangel Gavriil, Varna, and Sviatoslav, or destroyed in the wake of the Russian collapse after the Battle of Malakoff to prevent her capture, as with Iagudiil.
