= Joseph Martin Kronheim =

Joseph Martin Kronheim (1810–1896) was a German-born lithographer and wood engraver known for founding Kronheim & Co. and working with George Baxter.

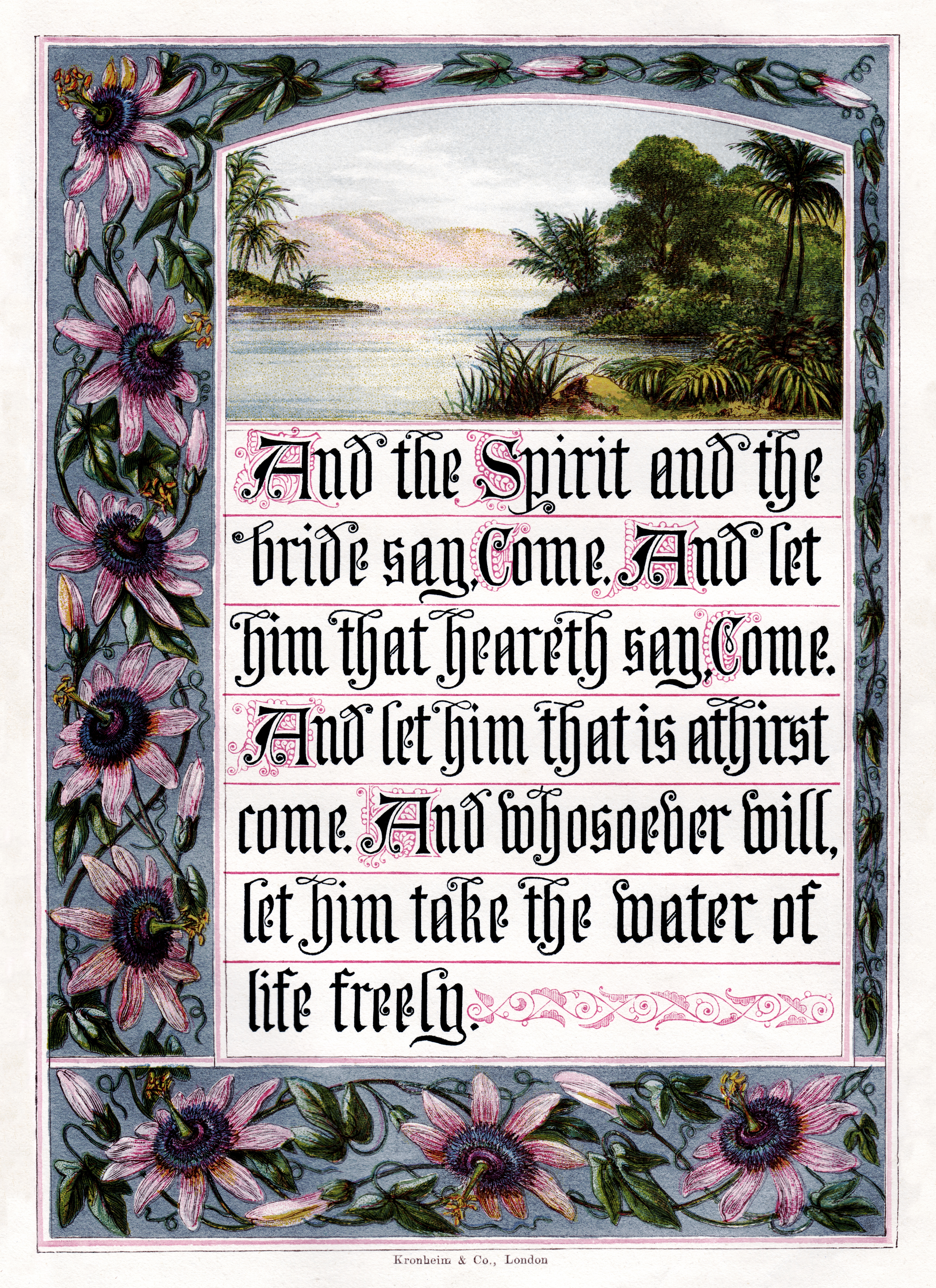
Kronheim's illustration of Revelation 22:17. Shiny silver ink surrounds the flowers, a very light blue ink is used for the sky, and several types of printing are combined, with the various inks using different methods.

== Biography ==
Kronheim was born on October 26, 1810, in Magdeburg, Germany. By the age of 22 he resided in Edinburgh, and died at the age of 85 in 1896, in Berlin.

== Kronheim & Co. ==
During the mid-1860s, Kronheim and Co. printed hundreds of biblical prints, adding to the firm's eventual total output of as many as 5000 different prints.

Kronheim & Co. utilized the Baxter process to create prints. Kronheim's chief innovation in the field was the use of zinc instead of wood blocks, which reduced the amount of time needed to complete prints, but resulted in a less shiny finish.

By 1855, thanks in large part to the firm's use of zinc blocks, Kronheim & Co. had produced over 1000 different prints, including some for the 1855 Paris Exhibition. After the exhibition, Kronheim sold his share of the business to Oscar Frauenknecht.

Kronheim retired to Germany and attempted to set up other printing businesses, including an American one. However, these efforts failed, causing Kronheim to lose all of his investments. So, he rejoined Frauenknecht and his old firm, Kronheim & Co., but not as a partner. The firm expanded into Manchester and Glasgow.

In 1875, due to the rise of steam power and steam lithography machines, Kronheim & Co. ceased using the Baxter process.

Kronheim worked under Frauenknecht for Kronheim and Co. until 1887.

== Legacy and criticism ==
Kronheim and Co. produced at least 4000 and as may as 5000 different prints. This immense output has led some critics (such as Courtney Lewis) to assert that his firm was more concerned with quantity than quality. Others, such as author Mike Martin, argue that Kronheim simply preferred a larger subject variety. Martin argues that Kronheim was an important book illustrator, of children's books in particular, and that much of his work was of high quality.

Kronheim is best known for his set of four large coaching scene prints, entitled Spring, Summer, Autumn and Winter.

In July 2000, the New Baxter Society held an exhibition sampling Kronheim's work at St. Albans.
