= Russian ship Sultan Makhmud =

Ship of the line of the Russian Imperial Navy

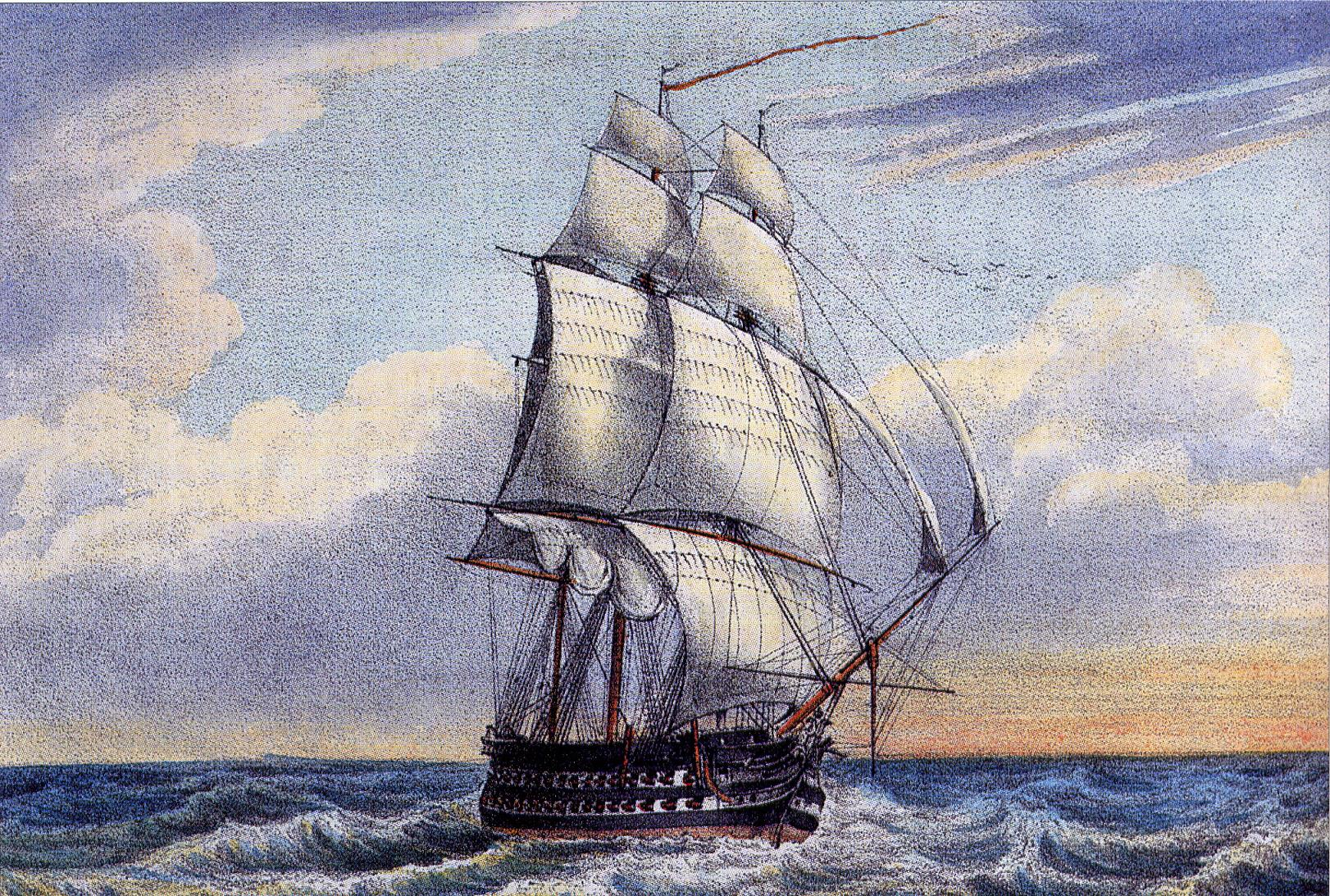
- Painting of Sultan Makhmud under sail

History

Russian Empire
- Name: Sultan Makhmud
- Builder: V. Apostoli, Nikolaev
- Laid down: 1 February 1835
- Launched: 31 October 1836
- Decommissioned: 1850
- Fate: Broken up, 1854

General characteristics
- Class & type: Sultan Makhmud-class ship of the line
- Displacement: 3,790 metric tons (3,730 long tons; 4,180 short tons)
- Length: 196 ft (60 m)
- Beam: 53 ft 6 in (16.31 m)
- Draft: 26 ft 7 in (8.10 m)
- Armament: 28 × 36-pound long guns; 32 × 36-pound short guns; 6 × 18-pound guns; 16 × 36-pound carronades

Sultan Makhmud was the lead ship of the Sultan Makhmud class of ships of the line built for the Imperial Russian Navy's Black Sea Fleet in the late 1830s and early 1840s. The ship supported a campaign by the Imperial Russian Army to pacify newly conquered territory in the Caucasus in the late 1830s and 1840, and thereafter patrolled the Black Sea in the early 1840s. She spent most of the last half of the decade out of service apart from brief periods of activity in 1847 and 1849, and was decommissioned in 1850. Hulked in 1852, she quickly deteriorated badly and was broken up in 1854.

== Design ==
The eight Sultan Makhmud-class ships of the line were ordered as part of a naval expansion program aimed at strengthening the Russian Black Sea Fleet during a period of increased tension with Britain and France over the decline of one of Russia's traditional enemies, the Ottoman Empire. Beginning in the 1830s, Russia ordered a series of 84-gun ships in anticipation of a future conflict, and the Sultan Makhmuds accounted for nearly half of the nineteen vessels built.

Sultan Makhmud was 196 feet (60 m) long, with a beam of 53 ft 6 in (16.31 m) and a draft of 23 ft 8 in (7.21 m) to 26 ft 7 in (8.10 m). She displaced 3,790 metric tons (3,730 long tons; 4,180 short tons) and measured 2,500 tons burthen. The ship was built with a round stern to increase its strength.

The ship carried a battery of twenty-eight 36-pounder long guns on the lower gun deck and another thirty-two 36-pound short-barreled guns on the upper gun deck. In her forecastle and quarterdeck, she mounted six 18-pound guns and sixteen 36-pound carronades.

== Service history ==
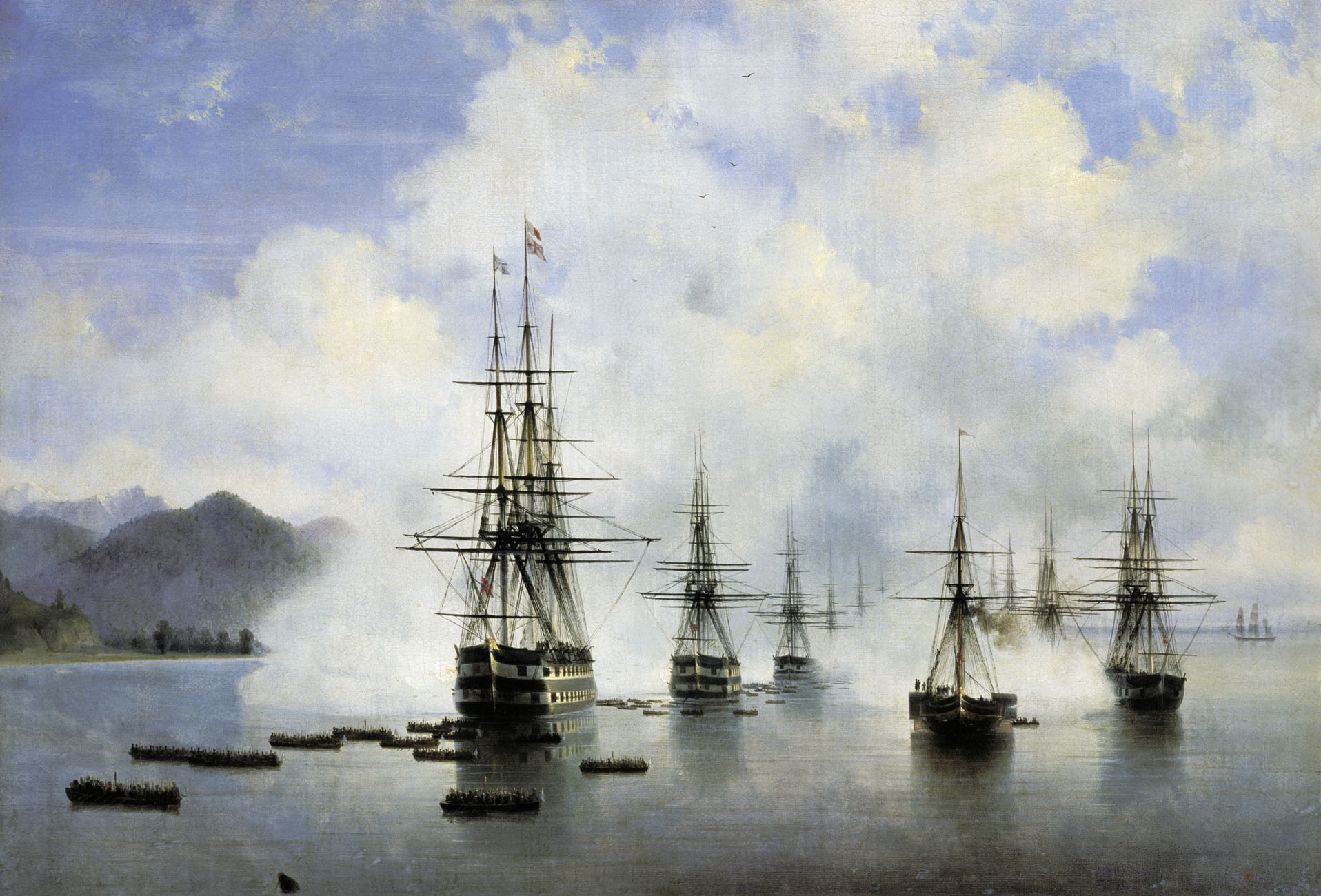
The landing of Russian troops at Sochi in May 1839 by Ivan Aivazovsky

Sultan Makhmud was laid down at the V. Apostoli shipyard in Nikolaev on 1 February 1835; she was launched on 31 October 1836. In 1837, she sailed to the naval base at Sevastopol. From 1838 to 1840, Sultan Mahmud participated in a lengthy operation to transport Imperial Russian Army troops to newly conquered fortifications in the Caucasus area that had been seized during the Russo-Turkish War of 1828–1829. During this period, the former Ottoman subjects revolted against Russian rule, and the soldiers were needed to suppress the restive population. The largest of these operations took place on 14 May 1839, when Sultan Makhmud and four other ships of the line, three frigates, and five smaller vessels under the command of Admiral Mikhail Lazarev carried soldiers to Sochi. The next day, Lazarev directed his ships to bombard the coast for fifteen minutes to prepare the way for some 2,700 soldiers to go ashore in small boats. The Russian infantry then fought a ferocious battle with more than 3,000 rebel troops.

From 1840 to 1842, she remained in active service with the fleet, cruising the Black Sea. In 1843, she helped to carry the 13th Division from Odessa to Sevastopol. She remained in service through 1845 when she was laid up, being reactivated for short periods again in 1847 and 1849. Sultan Makhmud was decommissioned in 1850 and converted into a hulk two years later. Found to have significantly deteriorated in condition and not worth repairing by 1854, she was then broken up.
