= George Baxter (printer) =

English artist (1804–1867)

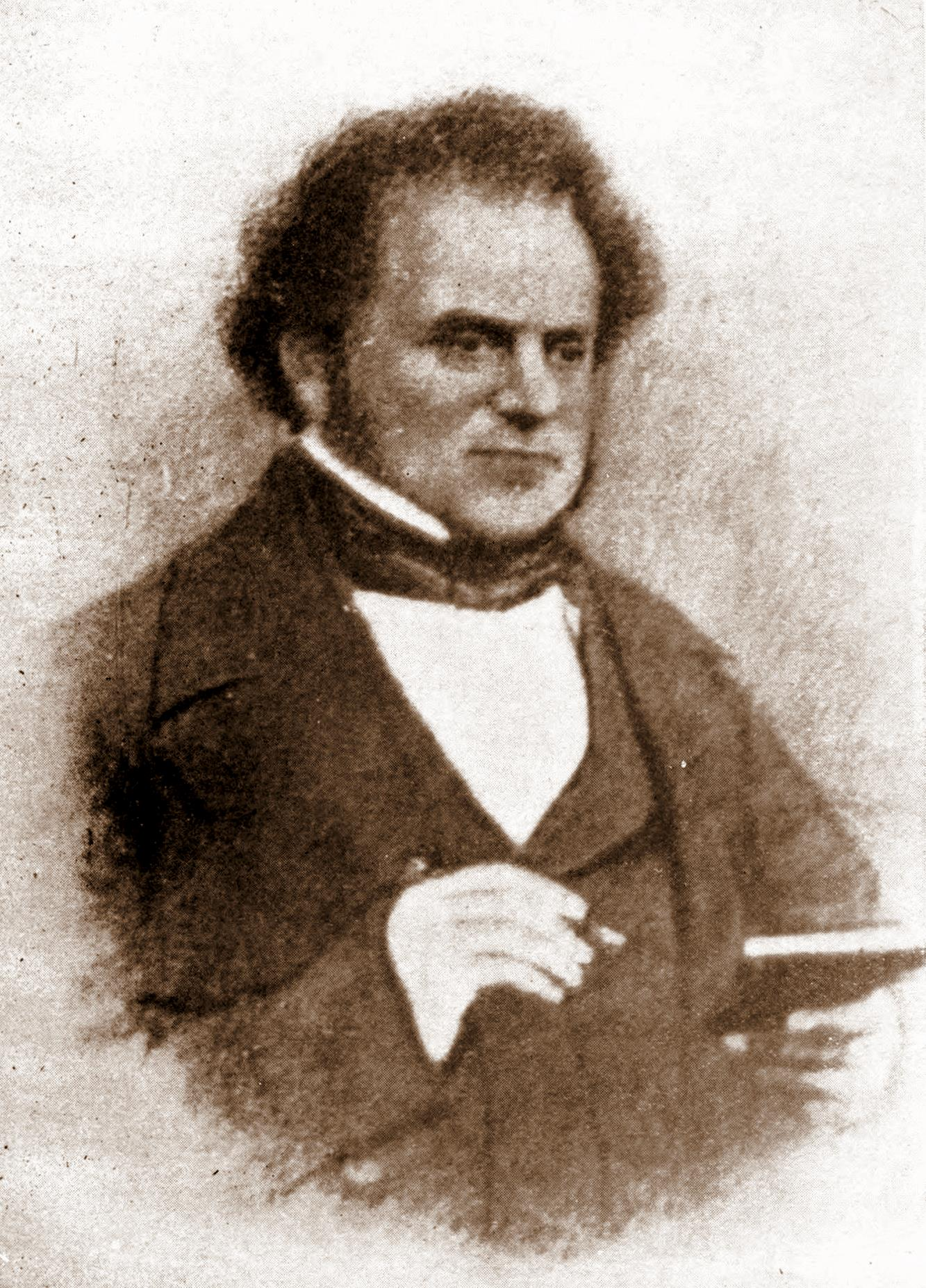
- Born: 1804; Lewes, Sussex, England
- Died: 1867 (aged 62–63); London, England
- Known for: Invention of commercially viable colour printing

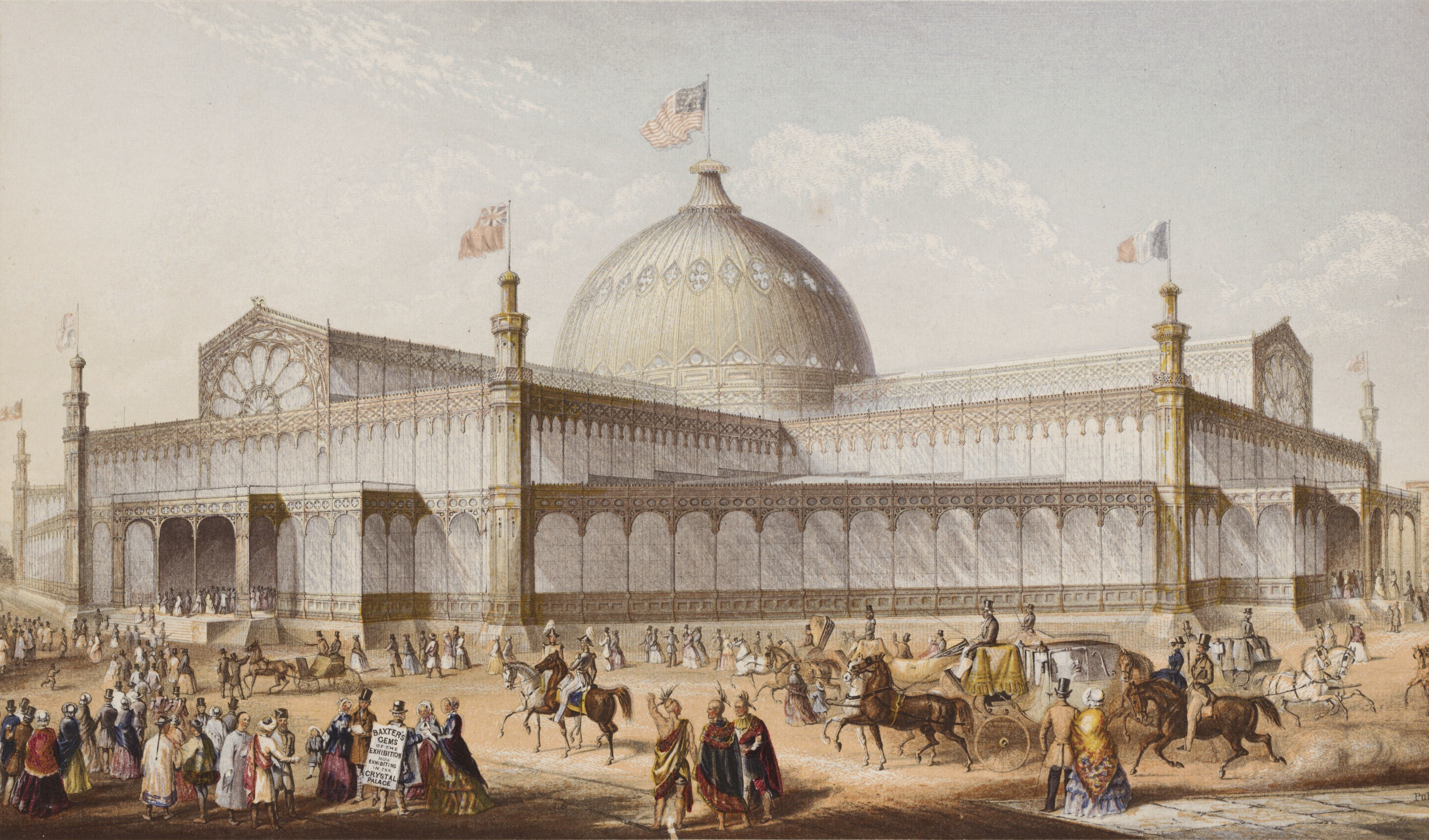
George Baxter's view of the New York Crystal Palace published in 1853

George Baxter (1804–1867) was an English artist and printer based in London. He is credited with the invention of commercially viable colour printing.

Though colour printing had been developed in China centuries before, it was not commercially viable. However, in early years of the 19th century the process of colour printing had been revived by George Savage, a Yorkshireman in London. It was to be Savage's methods upon which Baxter, already an accomplished artist and engraver, was to improve. In 1828, Baxter began experimenting with colour printing by means of woodblocks.

== Baxter's life ==
Baxter was born in 1804 in Lewes, Sussex, and was the second son of John Baxter, a printer. At 20, Baxter was illustrating books printed by his father; at 23, Baxter moved to London to be apprenticed to Samuel Williams, a wood engraver. In 1827, Baxter set up his own business and married Mary Harrild, daughter of Robert Harrild, a printing engineer and a friend of Baxter's father. Baxter now began to experiment with his own methods of colour printing – his first known colour print, Butterflies, was published in 1829. Baxter's experiments first bore commercial fruit in 1834, with two small vignettes published in Mudie's British Birds.

In 1835, Baxter was granted Patent No. 6916 – Improvements in Producing Coloured Steel Plate, Copper Plate and other Impressions, which outlined the combined intaglio and relief process he would continue to use for the next thirty years. Baxter's original patent ran for 14 years; after the renewal of his patent in 1849 for another five years, he began to sell licenses for the use of his printing process to other printing firms. In 1837, he published 'Pictorial Album; or, Cabinet of Paintings' containing designs, executed in oil colours from original pictures, with illustrations in verse and prose.

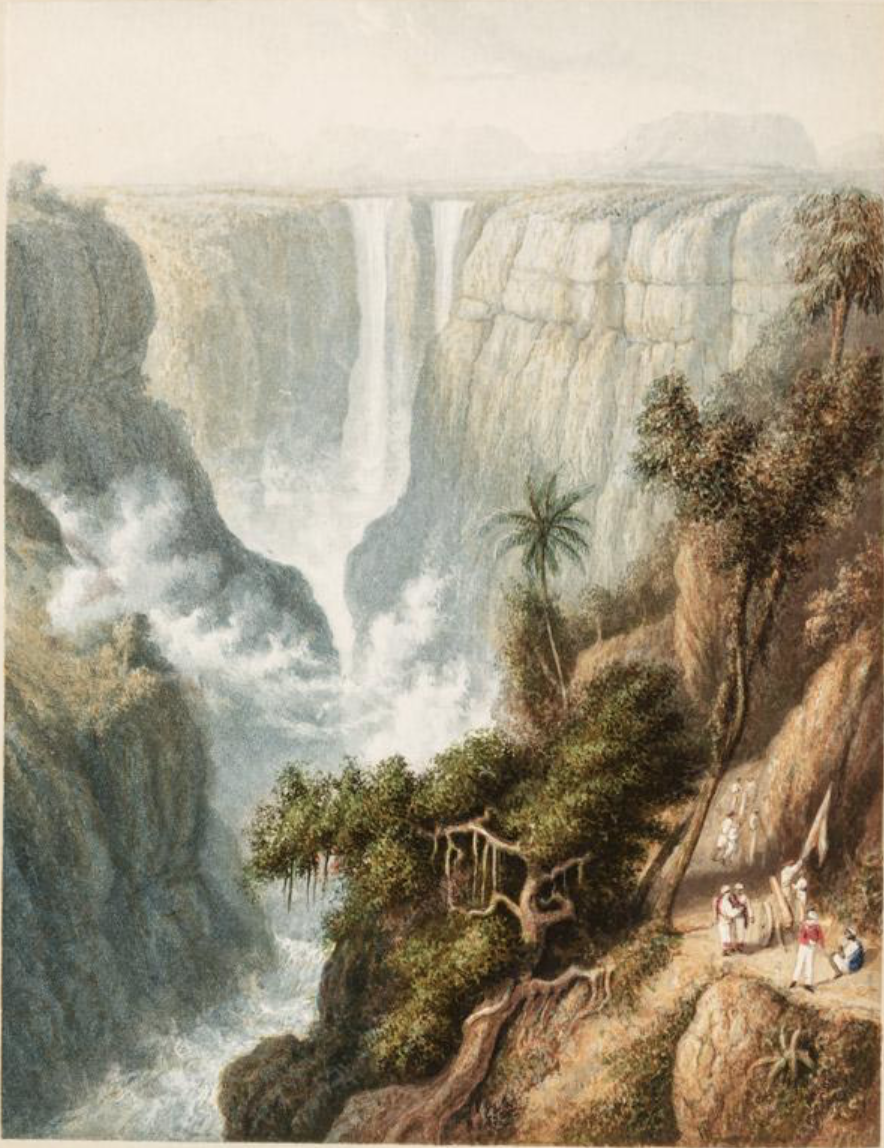
The Boa Ghaut from a painting by William Westall, Pictorial Album; or, Cabinet of Paintings, 1837

Baxter prints bear an imprint such as "Printed in Oil Colours and Published by G. Baxter, Patentee, 11, Northampton Square" or "Baxter Patent Oil Printing 11 Northampton Square". The house at 11 Northampton Square in Clerkenwell, London, was Baxter's home and workshop from 1844–1860. The site is marked by a plaque on the modern building at that address.

Despite his technical excellence and the general popularity of his prints, Baxter's business was never profitable – his process was laborious and it seems likely that his perfectionism prevented him from completing many of his commissioned works on time. In 1860, he held a sale of all his stock and equipment, most of which was not sold. Eventually, he sold his plates and blocks to the printer Vincent Brooks, who later republished some of Baxter's images. Baxter was declared bankrupt in 1865 and died in 1867, after an accident involving a horse omnibus.

It is estimated that Baxter himself printed over twenty million prints during his career.

== Baxter’s licensees ==
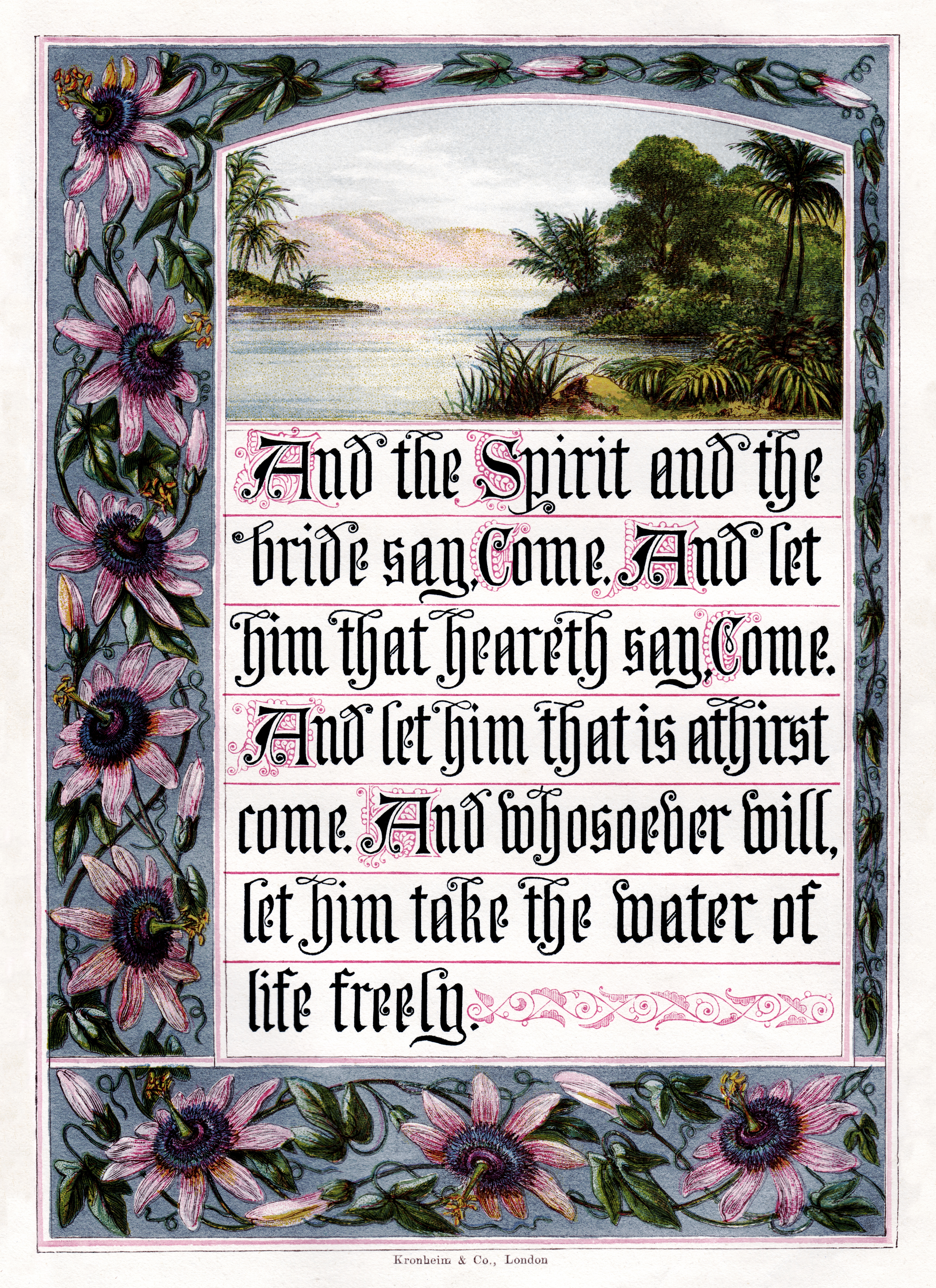
Joseph Martin Kronheim's illustration of Revelation 22:17. Shiny silver ink surrounds the flowers, a very light blue ink is used for the sky, and several types of printing are combined, with the various inks using different methods.

A number of printers purchased a licence from Baxter, following the renewal of his patent in 1849. The most well known of these was Abraham Le Blond. Other firms who worked under Baxter's license include Bradshaw & Blacklock; William Dickes; Kronheim & Co.; Joseph Mansell and Myers & Co. Other printers known to have used Baxter's methods after his patent expired included George Baxter Jr.; Vincent Brooks; Edmund Evans; Gregory, Collins & Reynolds; Leighton Bros; Moor & Crosby and William Russell. George Cargill Leighton, a former apprentice of Baxter's, never worked under Baxter's licence but became a prominent printer in his own right, becoming the printer and later owner of the Illustrated London News, the first journal in the world to include regular colour plates. Leighton could not use a metal intaglio plate as a base without infringing upon Baxter's patent, although "… the fact that he had to do without it probably helped to ensure his commercial success". Nevertheless, Leighton did often use an aquatint base.

Kronheim and Dickes both used Baxter's process from 1849 onwards, and both were large suppliers of colour plates to book publishers, "competing on price rather than quality". Baxter's patent process was not necessarily strictly followed by his licensees – for example, both Kronheim and Dickes were lithographic printers as well as wood engravers, and most likely mixed all of their printing methods together. In fact, it is often impossible to say exactly how a given colour print of this era has been produced. Generally, Baxter's licensees used fewer colour blocks than Baxter himself and, in the opinion of many, "none surpassed him in quality, being more concerned with cheapness".

== Baxter's method ==
Baxter's process for producing colour prints combined relief and intaglio printing methods. A 'key' plate was prepared, usually made of steel and using any combination of engraving, stipple, etching and aquatint. Baxter also appears to have used mezzotint and lithography to create his key plate on occasion. The key plate provided the main lines of the image and much of the tone, light and shade. It was usually printed in a neutral tone, such as light grey or terracotta. Often, Baxter used more than one colour to ink the key plate – for example, to gradate the image from blue in the sky, to buff in the middle distance and to a darker colour in the foreground; i.e. inking the plate à la poupée. Usually, Baxter used aquatint for landscapes and stipple to work faces and figures.

Following printing of the key plate, relief blocks were prepared, usually from wood but also from zinc or copper, using impressions of the key plate to create the blocks. Usually one block was prepared for each colour, although sometimes two or more colours or tints were included on the same block, requiring hand inking of each individual area. Each colour was applied and allowed to dry before adding the next colour. It is thought that Baxter started printing with a blue tint and then progressed through the other colours in a predetermined order – all blocks were numbered sequentially and labelled with the colour to be used. Sometimes up to 24 separate colours were used, although ten could be considered an average number. Baxter achieved his precise registration by fixing the print over a number of spikes, over which the blocks would also fit.

=== Hand finishing ===
Baxter is thought to have used hand-colouring for finishing touches on occasion – for example, "… extra touches of red on the mouths, high white lights upon jewels …". It is also believed Baxter occasionally applied glaze via an additional printing step all over the image, composed of his usual varnish with a 'hard drier' added to make it insoluble in water. More often, it is thought that Baxter glazed areas of the print selectively by hand using a glaze composed of gum arabic, egg white and Castile soap.
