= Naval long gun =

Class of naval artillery designed for longer range and improved mobility

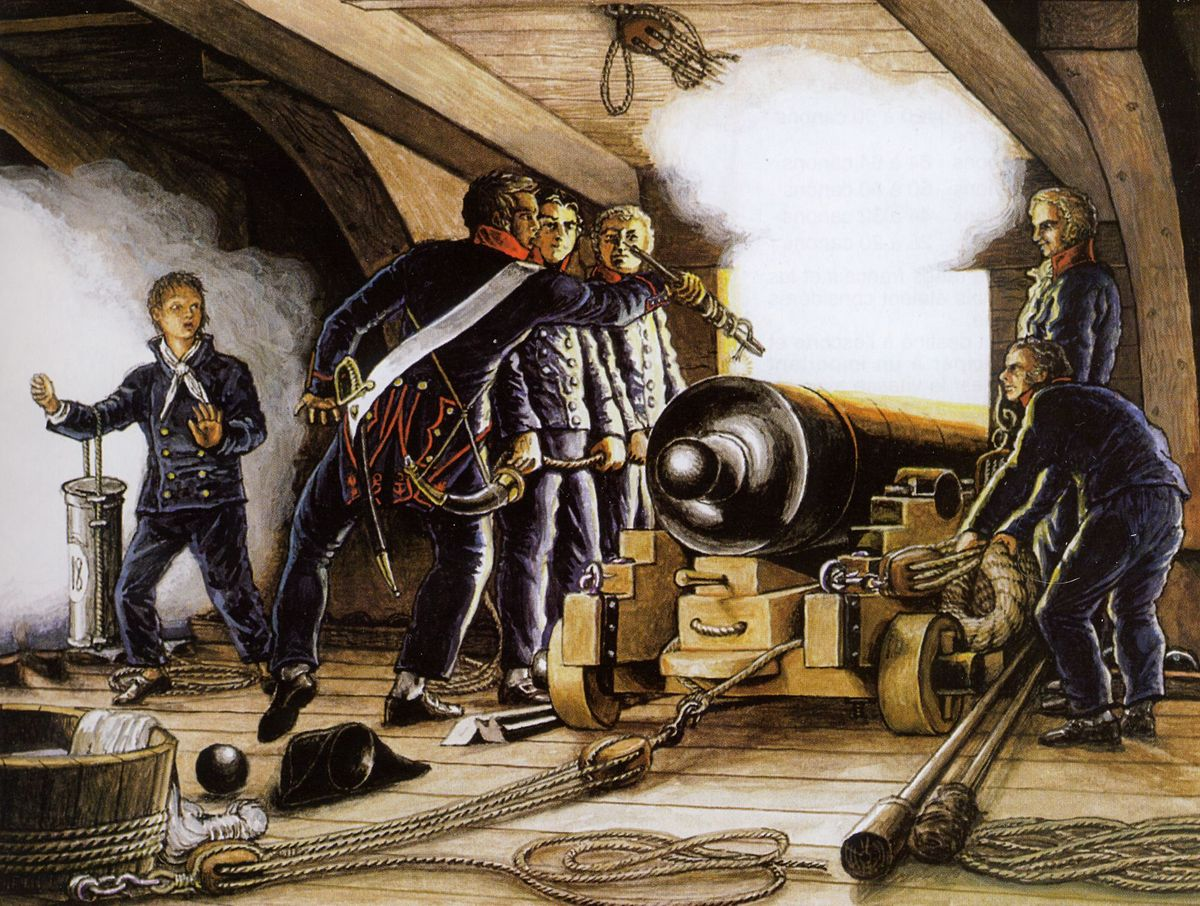
Louis-Philippe Crépin engraving of a French 18-pounder long gun being fired

In historical naval usage, a long gun was the standard type of cannon mounted by a sailing vessel, so called to distinguish it from the much shorter carronades. The long gun was known for its increased range and improved mobility in comparison to its larger precursors. This allowed the long gun to establish itself as the best form of artillery to pursue an enemy. In informal usage, the length was combined with the weight of shot, yielding terms like "long nines", referring to full-length, 9-pounder guns.

== Firing a long gun ==
Cannons are fired through a laborious process that involves the help of many people. It begins by cleaning out the barrel of the cannon with a wet swab. This helps to ensure that any left over embers from the last firing are extinguished before the gunpowder is put in. Once the barrel is clean, the gunpowder is put into the base of the cannon, either loosely or in cloth bags. A piece of cloth or rope is put in after the gunpowder to assure that it stays tightly packed. This is quite a coarse grained powder for a longer duration of burn. The cannonball follows and is topped off with a piece of wool or cotton. This secondary piece of cotton helps to keep the cannonball in place and secure with the explosives.

Long guns, being extremely heavy when fully loaded and ready to fire, had to be moved into position after being loaded. This typically took the full effort from the group of men attempting to transport it. The cannon is then pushed forward until it is in full contact with the side of the ship, and the barrel is pointed through the gun port.

Once in position, a small hole in the back of the cannon is lined with a small amount of (very fine in comparison to the main charge, so it burns fast) gunpowder. This process is called priming. From there, the cannon operator stood back from the cannon and held a string until the cannon was lined up with the enemy's ship. Once aimed in the right direction, the operator will pull the lanyard in order to fire the gun. The gun could typically only be fired two to three times in five minutes, so it was important that it hit its target.

== British gun specifications ==
=== Size regulation ===
Naval long guns, or long nines were originally made in only two sizes, eight feet (2.4 m) or nine feet (2.7 m). This was set by the Board of Ordnance in 1703. In the early 1700s, long guns started to dwindle in usage, but came back to prominence in 1761 when the Board of Ordnance changed its primary restriction of the size of long nines. The new protocol for manufacturing long guns included five lengths that ranged from seven feet (2.1 m) to nine feet (2.7 m) in length. The size of the gun often depended on the size of the ship that carried it, and how many of the guns the ship was to carry. In 1782, another change was made to the design of the long nine; it could be manufactured at a length of nine feet six inches (2.9 m).

=== Ammunition ===
The ammunition used in the naval long guns did not offer as much variety as the size of the gun did. The only ammunition used was a simple nine pound cannonball, called a nine pounder. Nine pounders were the lightest of all cannon ammunition, and therefore allowed long nines to have increased range. This played a large part behind the purpose of the gun, which was to chase and pursue a fleeing enemy ship or fleet.

== See also ==
- Naval artillery in the Age of Sail
- 8-pounder long gun
- 12-pounder long gun
- 18-pounder long gun
- 24-pounder long gun
- 30-pounder long gun
- 36-pounder long gun
