= Nikita Zotov =

Tutor, friend to Peter I of Russia

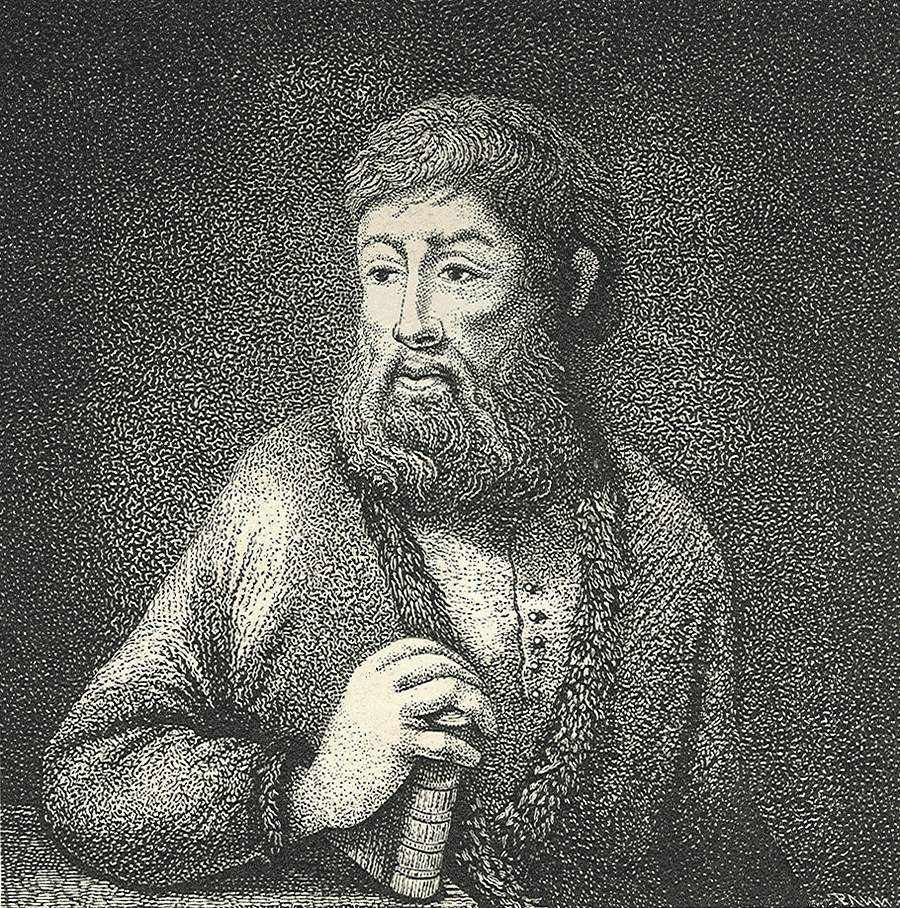
Nikita Zotov, rotogravure by Alexandr Osipov, 1882–1883

Count Nikita Moiseevich Zotov (Russian: Никита Моисеевич Зотов, romanized: Nikita Moiseyevich Zotov, IPA: [nʲ'kʲta moɨ'sʲɛɪvʲɪt͡ɕ 'zotv]) (1644 – December 1717) was a childhood tutor and lifelong friend of Russian Tsar Peter the Great. Historians disagree on the quality of Zotov's tutoring. Robert K. Massie, for example, praises his efforts, but Lindsey Hughes criticizes the education that he gave to the future tsar.

Not much is known about Zotov's life aside from his connection to Peter. Zotov left Moscow for a diplomatic mission to Crimea in 1680 and returned to Moscow before 1683. He became part of the "Jolly Company", a group of several dozen of Peter's friends that eventually became The All-Joking, All-Drunken Synod of Fools and Jesters. Zotov was mockingly appointed "Prince-Pope" of the Synod, and regularly led them in games and celebrations. He accompanied Peter on many important occasions, such as the Azov campaigns and the torture of the Streltsy after their uprising. Zotov held a number of state posts, including from 1701 a leading position in the Tsar's personal secretariat. Three years before his death, Zotov married a woman 50 years his junior. He died in December 1717 of unknown causes.

== Tutelage of Peter I ==
=== Background ===
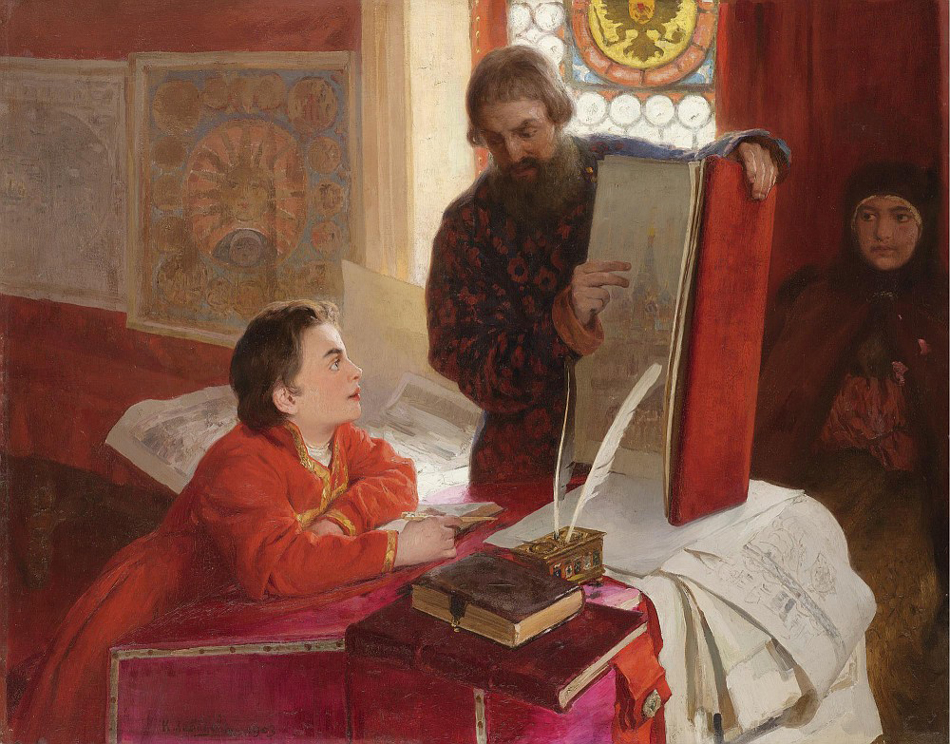
Zotov teaches young Peter I, painting by Klavdy Lebedev, 1913

Tsar Alexis of Russia, father to Peter I, was married twice. His first wife, Maria Miloslavskaya, bore him Feodor, who would later become Tsar despite his frail health. Following Maria's death, Alexis married Natalia Naryshkina, mother to Peter. Upon Alexis's death in 1676, Feodor ascended the throne, and his uncle Ivan Miloslavsky, previously exiled as the Governor of Astrakhan, returned to Moscow to serve as Chief Minister. The Miloslavsky family, having lost their influence due to Alexis's remarriage, harbored animosity towards the Naryshkin family, which included Peter, Natalia, and Natalia's foster father, Artamon Matveyev. Despite attempts by Miloslavsky to arrest the Naryshkins, Feodor intervened, allowing only for Matveyev's exile. Feodor permitted Peter and Natalia to live in private apartments within the Kremlin, despite the political unrest.

Education in 17th-century Moscow was minimal, with low literacy rates even among the nobility. The curriculum typically included basic reading, writing, and rudimentary history and geography. Religious scholars, however, often received instruction in grammar, mathematics, and foreign languages. Feodor and his half-sister, Tsarevna Sophia, were among those who received comprehensive education from Kiev’s religious scholars, gaining proficiency in Latin and Polish.

Peter began his education at a young age. Around 1674 or 1675, when he was three, Tsar Alexis provided him with a primer to learn the alphabet. Two years later, Tsar Feodor recommended that Peter commence his studies. The exact year of the start of Peter’s tutoring is disputed, with some sources suggesting as early as 1677 and others as late as 1683. However, many references pinpoint 12 March 1677 as the commencement date. Nikita Zotov, a former church clerk or “Duma secretary” from the tax-collection department of the government bureaucracy, was selected to instruct Peter in reading and writing.

=== Appointment and instruction ===
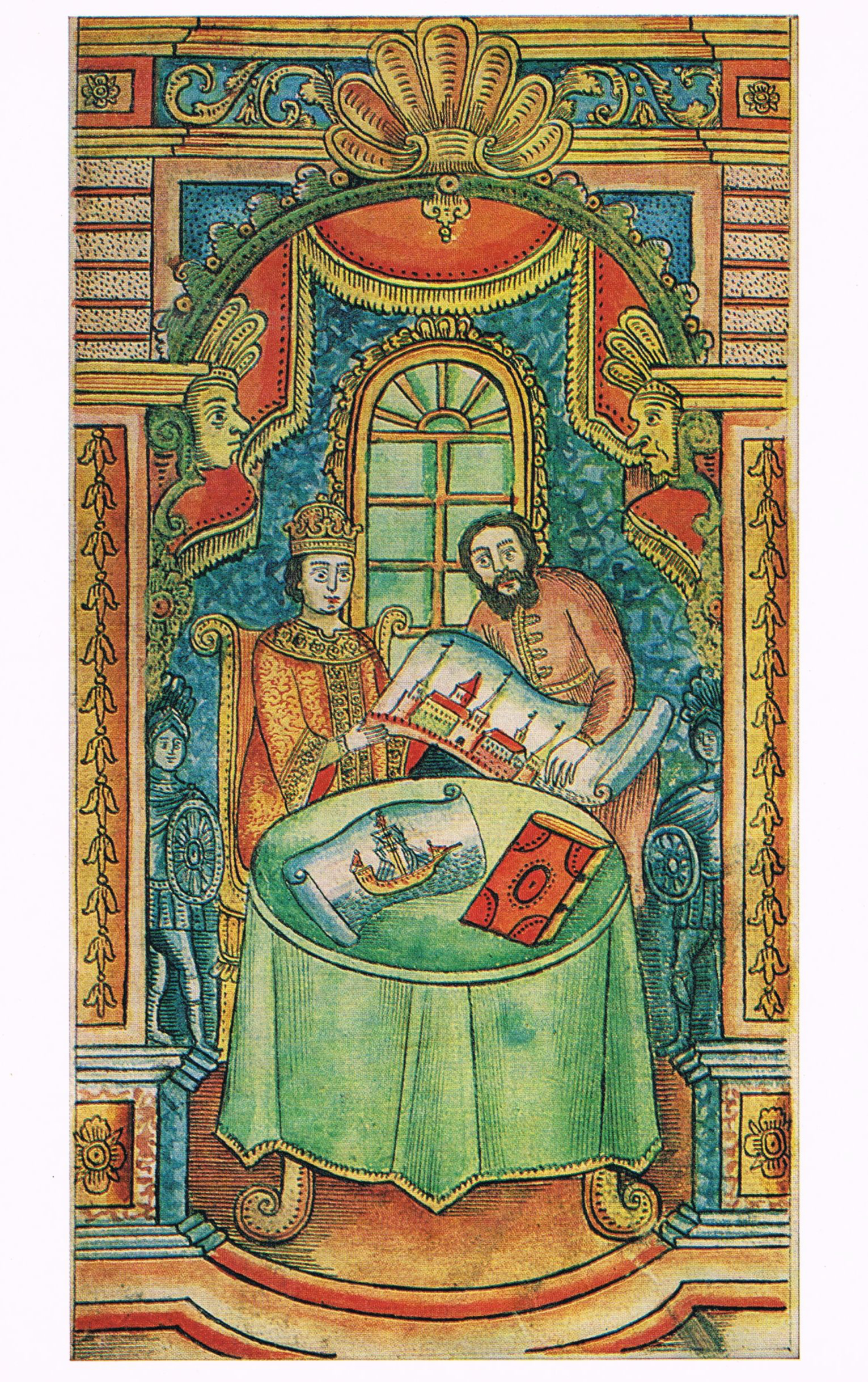
Nikita Zotov and Peter I

Nikita Zotov, although not a religious scholar, was well-versed in the Bible, a trait highly valued by Tsaritsa Natalia. Before commencing his work, he received generous gifts from Feodor, the Tsaritsa, and Patriarch Joachim, including an apartment, new clothing, and 100 rubles. He was also elevated to the status of a minor nobleman. Overwhelmed by the Tsaritsa's request, Zotov was eager to educate Peter and quickly formed a close bond with him, which lasted until Zotov's death.

Peter's education began the day after Zotov's appointment. The books were first sanctified with holy water, after which Zotov initiated his instruction with the alphabet and the Prayer Book. He taught Peter the Bible, from which Peter memorized extensive passages that he could recite even four decades later. Zotov also taught Peter to sing, a skill Peter often utilized to accompany church choirs in his later years.

Despite being initially assigned to teach only reading and writing, Zotov recognized Peter's intellectual curiosity and expanded his lessons to include Russian history, battles, and heroes. To keep Peter engaged, Zotov, with the Tsaritsa's approval, introduced engravings of foreign cities, palaces, sailing ships, weapons, and historical events into the study room. These, along with a relatively accurate globe, served to divert Peter when he grew tired of his studies.

In addition to Zotov, other informal tutors and servants were brought in to instruct Peter in a variety of subjects, such as royal and military history, blacksmithing, carpentry, joinery, and printing. Unusually for Russian nobility of the time, Peter also received instruction in sailing and shipbuilding. These tutors also engaged Peter in vigorous outdoor games involving live ammunition.

=== Impact ===
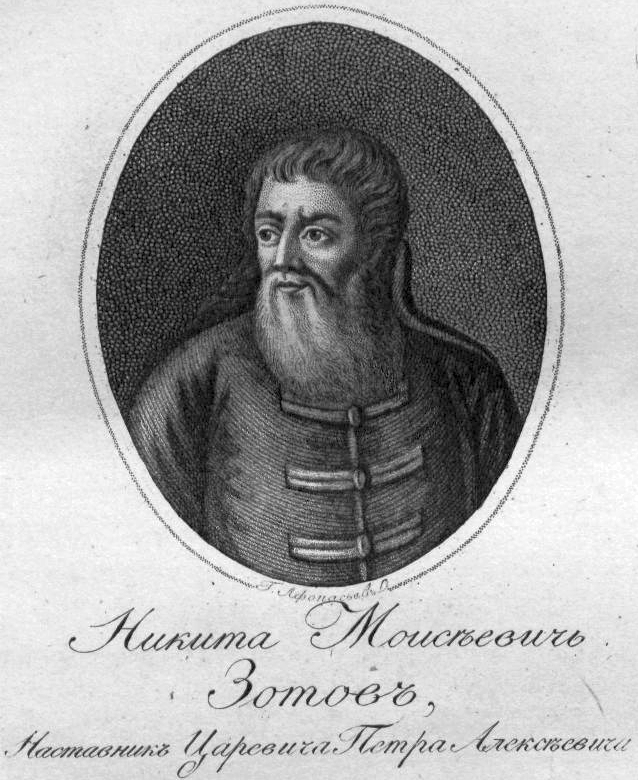
Nikita Zotov

Zotov was one of Peter's earliest and closest friends. His role as Peter's tutor has been evaluated differently by historians. Lindsey Hughes criticized him for failing to teach Peter the skills and knowledge expected of a future tsar. Robert K. Massie defended him for providing Peter with a stimulating and diverse education that suited his curiosity and self-reliance. Zotov's intimacy with the Tsar aroused the jealousy and suspicion of other government officials, such as Menshikov.

Zotov left for a three-year diplomatic mission to Crimea in 1680, but it is unclear whether this was before or after he tutored Peter. Peter moved to Preobrazhenskoye two years later, where he distanced himself from the traditional subjects taught by his siblings’ tutors. He resumed his studies with Afanassyi Nesterov and Zotov when the latter returned from Crimea. Peter focused on natural and military sciences, but also learned some theology from his tutors. Zotov, and later his sons, helped Peter translate books on fortification from Western European languages into Russian. Peter lacked or forgot much of the mathematical knowledge he needed for siege warfare and fortification, and he later regretted not having a more comprehensive education. He tried to give his daughters Anne and Elizabeth the same level of education as European princesses.

== Prince-Pope of Drunken Synod ==
In 1692, Peter, who had by then become Tsar of Russia, formed a group known as The All-Joking, All-Drunken Synod of Fools and Jesters. This assembly was a satirical imitation of religious gatherings. Zotov, known for his sobriety and fasting, was appointed the “Prince-Pope” of the Synod, earning him the occasional title of Patriarch Bacchus. Despite Zotov's claims of illness and fatigue, Peter insisted on his participation in the group's festivities.

Zotov soon became an integral part of these mock celebrations. He would initiate the gatherings by toasting to everyone's health and then “blessing” the group with the Sign of the Cross, using two long Dutch pipes. During holidays, the group's games spilled onto the streets of Moscow. At Christmas, the Jolly Company, led by Zotov, would traverse the city on sleighs, singing songs. Zotov, seated on a sleigh drawn by twelve bald men, donned an eccentric costume embellished with playing cards, a tin hat, and a barrel for a seat. In the first week of Lent, a procession of “penitents” followed Zotov through the city, riding on donkeys, oxen, and sleighs pulled by various animals, including goats, pigs, and bears.

== High office ==
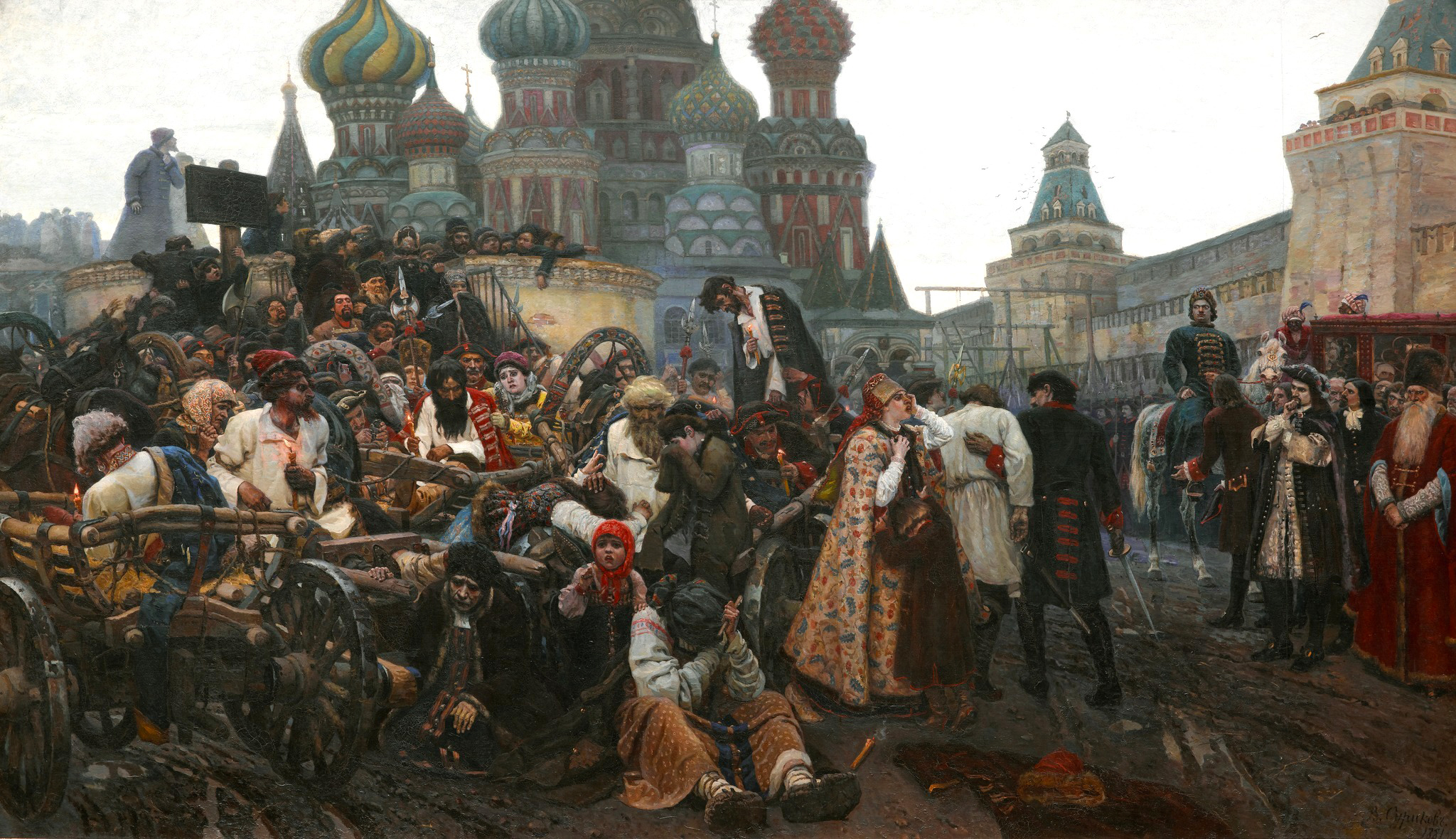
Morning of Execution of Streltsy, by Vasily Ivanovich Surikov, 1881

In 1695 and 1696, Peter the Great led two campaigns against the Turkish stronghold of Azov. The first campaign was unsuccessful, but the second, in 1696, resulted in victory. The Russian forces surrounded the city by land and sea, breached the walls, and compelled the Pasha of Azov to surrender honorably. This victory, the first since the reign of Peter's father Alexis, astounded the people of Moscow. Peter delayed his return to allow Andrew Vinius, a fellow member of the All-Joking Company, to organize a victory parade in the capital. The triumphant return on October 10 was marked not by a traditional Orthodox reception, but by a procession through an arch symbolically supported by Hercules and Mars. Breaking with tradition, Peter did not lead the procession; instead, it was led by 18 horsemen escorting carriages carrying Zotov and war hero Fedor Golovin.

During a European tour in 1698, Peter learned of a rebellion by the Streltsy and immediately returned from Vienna. After quelling the rebellion, he ordered the secret torture of the instigators, a task carried out by members of his Jolly Company, including Fyodor Romodanovsky, Boris Golitsyn, and himself.

In 1701, Zotov was appointed head of the newly established Privy Council, a body similar to the now-defunct Duma. Peter elevated Zotov to the rank of count in 1710, and when the Governing Senate was established a year later, Zotov was appointed to oversee it.

== Personal life ==
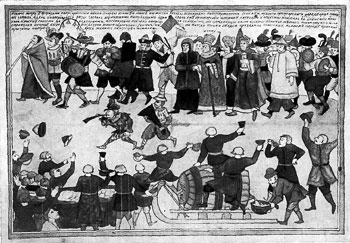
Marriage of Zotov in 1714 Lubok, 18th century

Nikita Zotov was married twice and fathered three sons from his first marriage. His eldest son, Vasily Zotov (d. 1729), received his education abroad and was appointed Revisor-General of Ukazes (Inspector General of Decrees) in November 1715. Despite his official role of overseeing the Senate and enforcing its decrees, Vasily held little political power. The second son, Ivan Zotov (1687–1723), resided and studied in France, where he worked as a translator. The youngest, Konon Zotov (1690–30 December 1742), pursued his studies in England and held various positions in the Russian Navy and judicial system.

According to Robert K. Massie and Lindsey Hughes, in October 1713, Peter expressed his intention for Zotov to remarry, specifically to Anna Pashkova, a widow fifty years Zotov's junior. This was despite Zotov's desire to retire to a monastery. However, other sources, including the Brockhaus and Efron Encyclopedic Dictionary and Sergey Solovyov, suggest that Zotov himself proposed the marriage in 1714 and that his monastic aspirations were merely a jest.

Zotov's wedding, described by Friedrich Christian Weber, the ambassador of Hanover, as “solemnized by the court in masks,” took place on 27 and 28 January 1715. The event, prepared over three months, was characterized by its inversion of norms. The Jolly Company donned absurd attire, and many attendees behaved contrary to convention. The wedding procession included stammering invitation deliverers, crippled bridesmen, gout-ridden runners, and a purportedly centenarian (and blind) priest. Lindsey Hughes suggests that the event may have been a variation on the Western charivari or shaming ceremonies, demonstrating the Tsar's control over his subjects’ lives. During the wedding, the Drunken Synod sang carols in Moscow's streets and solicited money, which effectively became a New Year tax for the affluent.

== Death ==
Nikita Zotov died in December 1717 due to unspecified causes. Peter the Great promptly appointed Peter Buturlin as Zotov's successor in the role of “Prince-Pope,” electing him on 28 December 1717 and officially appointing him on 10 January 1718. In the autumn of 1721, Peter arranged for Zotov's widow to marry Buturlin. A dispute arose between Konon Zotov and his stepmother over the distribution of Nikita Zotov's estate. To avoid sharing the inheritance with his stepmother's family, Konon attempted to invalidate Nikita's second marriage.

== Bibliography ==
- Bain, Robert Nisbet (1967) [First published 1905]. The First Romanovs. (1613–1725): A History of Moscovite Civilisation and The Rise of Modern Russia Under Peter The Great and His Forerunners. Russell & Russell, A Division of Atheneum House Inc. OCLC 405625.
- Бердников, Лев (2007). "Всешутейший патриарх: Очерк их серии "Феномен шутовства в русской культуре XVIII века"". Новый Журнал (in Russian) (249).
- Brechka, Frank T. (Winter 1982). "Peter the Great: The Books He Owned". The Journal of Library History. 17 (1): 1–15. JSTOR 25541234.
- Boguslavsky, Vladimir V. (2004). "Зотов Никита Моисеевич" [Zotov Nikita Moiseevich]. Славянская энциклопедия: XVII век в 2-х томах, Volume 1 [Slavic encyclopedia: 17th century, in 2 volumes, volume 1] (in Russian). Olma Media Group. ISBN 5-224-02249-5.
- Bushkovitch, Paul A. (1990). "The Epiphany Ceremony of the Russian Court in the Sixteenth and Seventeenth Centuries". Russian Review. 49 (1): 1–17. doi:10.2307/130080. JSTOR 130080.
- Bushkovitch, Paul A. (2001). Peter the Great: The Struggle for Power, 1671–1725. Cambridge, England: Cambridge University Press. ISBN 0-521-80585-6.
- Cracraft, James (1971). The Church Reform of Peter the Great. Stanford University Press. ISBN 978-0-8047-0747-3.
- Gitermann, Valentin (1945). Geschichte Russlands (in German). Vol. 2. Zurich: Büchergilde Gutenberg.
- Grey, Ian (1960). Peter the Great: Emperor of All Russia. Philadelphia and New York: J. B. Lippincott Company. ISBN 978-0-397-00140-8.
- Hosking, Geoffrey (1998). Russia: People and Empire, 1552–1917 (2 ed.). Harvard University Press. ISBN 978-0-674-78119-1.
- Hughes, Lindsey (1998). Russia in the Age of Peter the Great. New Haven, Connecticut: Yale University Press. ISBN 978-0-300-07539-7.
- Hughes, Lindsey (2004). Peter the Great: A Biography. New Haven, Connecticut: Yale University Press. ISBN 978-0-300-10300-7.
- Ламбин, Н.П. (1844). История Петра Великого [History of Peter the Great] (in Russian). Типография Ф.И. Эльснера. Archived from the original on July 19, 2011. "Никита Зотов ... 12 марта 1677 года начал учение царевича (Nikita Zotov ... on 12 March 1677 started teaching the young Tzar)."
- Kamenskiĭ, Aleksandr (1987). Griffiths, David Mark (ed.). The Russian Empire in the Eighteenth Century: Searching for a Place in the World. Translated by Griffiths. London: M.E. Sharpe. ISBN 978-1-56324-575-6.
- LeDonne, John P. (July–December 1987). "Ruling Families in the Russian Political Order. 1689–1825". Cahiers du Monde Russe et Soviétique. 28 (3/4): 233–293, 295–322. doi:10.3406/cmr.1987.2115. JSTOR 20170587.
- Massie, Robert K. (1981). Peter the Great: His Life and World. New York: Ballantine Books. ISBN 0-345-29806-3.
- Massie, Robert K. (2011). Catherine the Great: Portrait of a Woman. New York: Random House. ISBN 978-0-679-45672-8.
- Nikiforov, Leonid Alekseyevich (2009). "Peter I (emperor of Russia)". Encyclopædia Britannica Online. Encyclopædia Britannica, Inc..
- Pekarskyi, P. P. (1862). Наука и литература в России при Петре Великом [Science and literature in Russian during (the rule of) Peter the Great] (in Russian). Vol. I. Saint Petersburg: Товарищество "Общественная польза".
- Robson, Eleanor; Stedall, Jacqueline A. (2009). The Oxford Handbook of the History of Mathematics. New York: Oxford University Press. ISBN 978-0-19-921312-2.
- Petrovskyi, S. (1875). О Сенате в царствование Петра Великого [On the Senate during the rule of Peter the Great] (in Russian). Moscow: Katkov & Co.
- Solovyov, Sergey M. (2001) [First published 1866]. "Глава третья. Продолжение царствования Петра I Алексеевича" [Chapter 3. Ruling of Peter I (continued)]. IPage История России с древнейших времен [History of Russia from the Earliest Times] (in Russian). Vol. 16. Moscow: AST. ISBN 5-17-002536-X. Archived from the original on 9 March 2009.
- Troyat, Henri (1987) [First published 1979]. Peter the Great. New York: E. P. Dutton. ISBN 0-525-24547-2.
- Williams, Henry Smith, ed. (1907). The Historians' History of the World: Switzerland (concluded), Russia and Poland. Vol. 17. The Times.
- Wittram, Reinhard (1964). Peter I. Czar und Kaiser (in German). Vol. 1. Göttingen: Vandenhoek & Ruprecht.
