= Admiral Senyavin =

Admiral Senyavin may refer to:

- Dmitry Senyavin
  - Soviet cruiser Admiral Senyavin
  - Russian coast defense ship Admiral Seniavin
- Alexei Senyavin
- Naum Senyavin
