= List of Russian sail frigates =

This is a list of Russian sail frigates of the period 1694–1852:
The format is: Name, number of guns (rank/real amount), launch year (A = built in Arkhangelsk), fate (service = combat service, BU = broken up)

== Sail frigates of war ==
=== Early Russian frigates ===
- 2 small frigates (1689, training vessels on Lake Pleshcheyevo) – Discarded 1723, burnt 1783
- Sviatoi Apostol Pavel 24 ("Святой Апостол Павел", 1694, A) – In October 1694 sent from White Sea to France as a merchant ship with the state goods, captured by France just in harbour because sailed under the Dutch ensign during the War of the Grand Alliance
- Sviatoye Prorochestvo 44 (Santa Prophetia) ("Святое Пророчество" or "Санта Профетиа") (1694, Dutch-built for Russia) – Converted to merchant vessel after 1695 and sent from Arkhangelsk to Europe with goods, last mentioned 1694

==== Sviatogo Dukha-class (2 units) ====
- Sviatogo Dukha 12 ("Святого Духа", 1702, A) – Dragged over the land to Lake Onega 1702, sailed to Lake Ladoga and participated in assault of Nöteburg 1702, last mentioned 1702 (probably damaged by ice and wrecked in winter 1702/1703)
- Kur‘yer 12 ("Курьер", 1702, A) - Dragged over the land to Lake Onega 1702, sailed to Lake Ladoga and participated in assault of Nöteburg 1702, last mentioned 1702 (probably damaged by ice and wrecked in winter 1702/1703)

=== Frigates of the Baltic Fleet (1703–1852) ===
==== Sias‘skii-class (2 units) ====
- fan Sas № 1 18 ("фан Сас № 1", 1702) - Converted to fire-ship and renamed Etna ("Этна") 1705
- fan Sas № 2 18 ("фан Сас № 2", 1702) - Converted to fire-ship and renamed Vezuvii ("Везувий") 1705

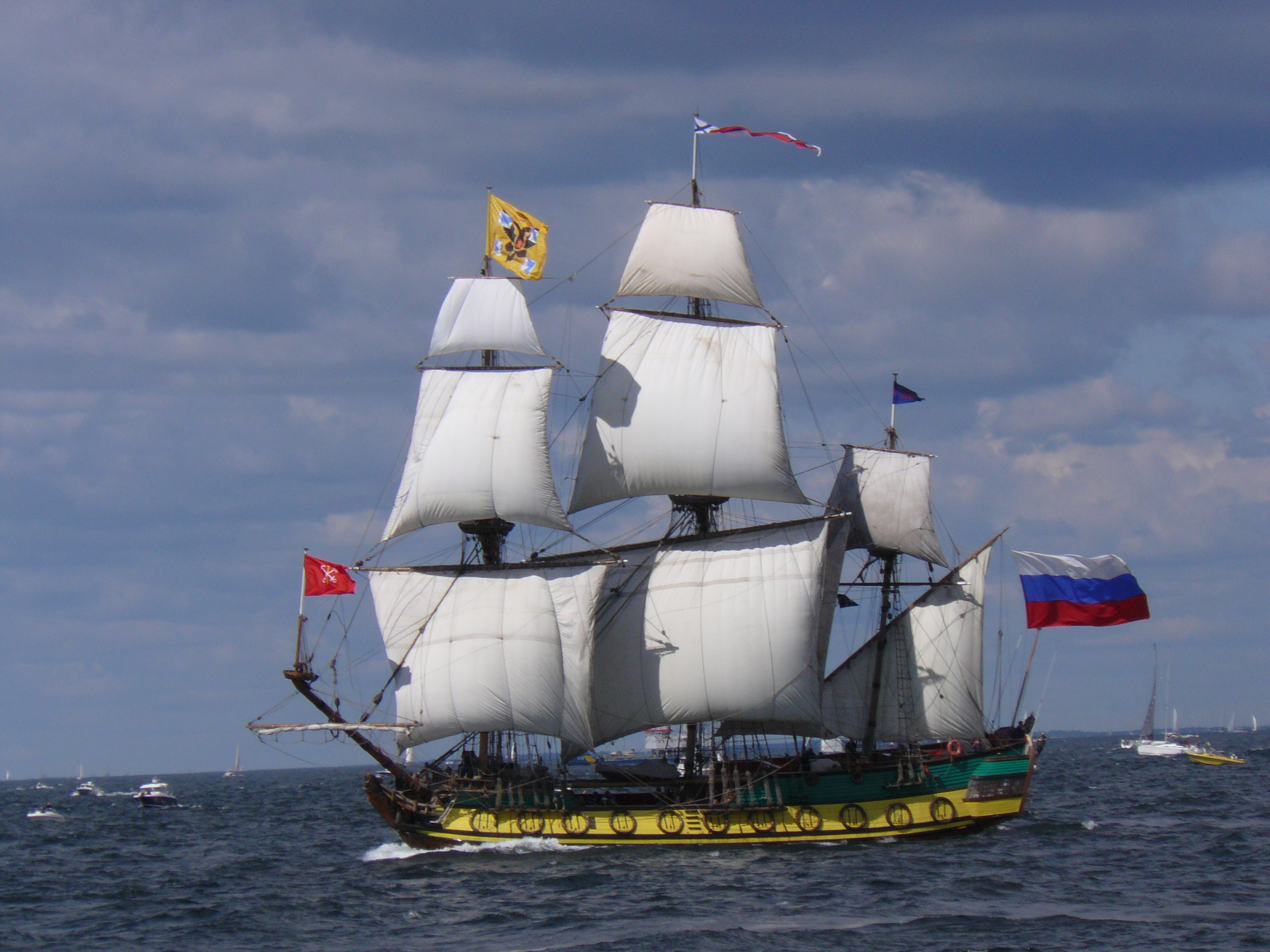
Modern exact replica (1999) of frigate Shtandart (1703)

- Shtandart 28 ("Штандарт", 1703) – Classified as 28-gun ship until 1710, BU 1730, Exact replica launched 1999
- Sviatoi Ilya 26 ("Святой Илья", 1703, A) – Wrecked at the Baltic Sea 1712

==== Shlissel‘burg-class (7 units) ====
- Shlissel‘burg 28/24 ("Шлиссельбург", 1704) - Classified as 28-gun ship until 1710, BU after 1710
- Kronshlot 28/24 ("Кроншлот", 1704) – Classified as 28-gun ship until 1710, BU after 1710
- Peterburg 28/24 ("Петербург", 1704) – Classified as 28-gun ship until 1710, BU after 1710
- Triumph 28/24 ("Триумф", 1704) – Classified as 28-gun ship until 1710, converted to fire-ship 1710
- Derpt 28/24 ("Дерпт", 1704) – Classified as 28-gun ship until 1710, converted to fire-ship 1710
- Narva 28/24 ("Нарва", 1704) – Classified as 28-gun ship until 1710, BU after 1710
- Fligel‘-de-Fam 28/24 ("Флигель-де-Фам", 1704) - Classified as 28-gun ship until 1710, flagship of vice-admiral Cornelius Cruys at the Kronstadt defence 1705 during the Great Northern War, converted to fire-ship 1710

==== Mikhail Arkhangel-class (2 units) ====
- Mikhail Arkhangel 28 ("Михаил Архангел", 1704) – Classified as 28-gun ship until 1710, BU after 1710
- Ivan-gorod 28 ("Иван-город", 1705) – Classified as 28-gun ship until 1710, BU after 1710
- anonymous – BU on slip 1705
- Olifant 32/26 ("Олифант", 1705) – Classified as 32-gun ship until 1710, BU 1712
- Dumkrat 32/26 ("Думкрат", 1707) – Classified as 32-gun ship until 1710, BU 1713

==== Sviatoi Piotr-class (2 units) ====
- Sviatoi Piotr 32 ("Святой Пётр", 1710, A) – BU 1719
- Sviatoi Pavel 32 ("Святой Павел", 1710, A) – BU in Copenhagen 1716
- Samson 32 ("Самсон", 1711, Dutch-built for Russia) – Visited Britain 1715, hulked 1733, BU after 1739
- Sviatoi Yakov 32/22 ("Святой Яков", ex-Dutch ?) - Purchased in Holland 1711, BU after 1732
- Esperans 44 ("Эсперанс") (ex-Dutch 50-gun ship Hardenbroek, captured by France in 1706 and renamed Esperance) – Purchased in France 1712, visited France 1726–1727, BU after 1739
- Sviatoi Nikolai 42/50 ("Святой Николай", ex-Dutch ?) - Purchased in Holland 1712, converted to transport 1716
- Lansdou 32 ("Лансдоу", ex-French, ex-Britain HMS Norris) – Purchased in Britain 1713, BU 1725
- Richmond 44 ("Ричмонд", ex-British HMS Swiftsure) – Purchased 1714 in Britain, BU 1721
- Sviatoi Ilya 32 ("Святой Илья", 1714) – Armed by flame throwers 1717, BU 1721
- Amsterdam-Galey 32 ("Амстердам-Галей", 1720, Dutch-built for Russia) – Visited Spain 1725–1726, wrecked 1740 near Greifswalder Oie Island 1740
- Dekrondelivde (also De kroon de liefde, "Декронделивде") 32 (1720, Dutch-built for Russia) – Visited Spain 1725–1726, last mentioned 1743
- Endracht 32 ("Эндрахт", 1720, Dutch-built for Russia) – Captured by Sweden during the route to Russia in 1720, further fate unknown

==== Kreyser-class (3 units) ====
- Kreyser 32 ("Крейсер", 1723) – BU 1732
- Yacht-hound 32 ("Яхт-хунд", 1724) – BU 1736
- Wind-hound 32 ("Винд-хунд", 1724) – BU 1736
- Rossiya 32 ("Россия", 1728) – BU 1752
- Vakhmeister 46 ("Вахмейстер", 1732) – Last mentioned 1742
- Mitau 32 ("Митау", 1733) – Captured by France in 1734 during the War of the Polish Succession, released 1734, BU 1747
- Printsessa Anna 12 ("Принцесса Анна", 1733) – Renamed Sviatoi Yakov ("Святой Яков") 1745, BU after 1755

==== Gektor-class (16 units) ====
- Gektor 32 ("Гектор", 1736, A) – Wrecked 1742
- Voin 32 ("Воин", 1737, A) – BU 1755
- Kavaler 32 ("Кавалер", 1737, A) – BU 1755
- Merkurius 32 ("Меркуриус", 1740, A) – Wrecked in Kattegat 1743
- Apollon 32 ("Аполлон", 1740, A) – BU 1756
- Selafail 32 ("Селафаил", 1746, A) – BU 1760
- Yagudiil 32 ("Ягудиил", 1746, A) – BU 1760
- Arkhangel Mikhail 32 ("Архангел Михаил", 1748, A) – Wrecked 1760
- Kreyser 32 ("Крейсер", 1751, A) – BU 1763
- Vakhtmeister 32 ("Вахтмейстер", 1754, A) – Sunk from leak 1757
- Rossiya 32 ("Россия", 1754, A) – BU 1771
- Sviatoi Mikhail 32 ("Святой Михаил", 1758, A) – BU 1771
- Sviatoi Sergii 32 ("Святой Сергий", 1761, A) – BU 1771
- Gremiaschii 32 ("Гремящий", 1763, A) – Converted to harbour vessel 1778
- Nadezhda 32 ("Надежда", 1763, A) – Served at the Aegean Sea 1769–1775, converted to transport vessel 1780
- Afrika 32 ("Африка", 1768, A) – Served at the Aegean Sea 1769–1775, BU 1790
- Sviatoi Fiodor 32 ("Святой Фёдор", 1762, A) – BU 1774
- Vestovoi 8 ("Вестовой", Purchased and converted to frigate 1763–1764) – BU after 1776
- Nadezhda Blagopoluchiya 34 ("Надежда Благополучия", 1764) – Built for the voyage to the Mediterranean Sea, served there in 1764 and 1769–1775, BU in Naoussa 1775
- Sviatoi Aleksandr 8 ("Святой Александр", 1766) – Last mentioned 1775
- Vtoraya Ekaterina 20 ("Вторая Екатерина", ex-yacht, c. 1763, converted to frigate 1773) – Converted to harbour vessel 1777, BU 1782
- Pochtalyon 20/24 9 ("Почтальон", ex-packet boat, 1766, converted to frigate 1775) – Served at the Aegean Sea 1769–1775, transferred to the Azov Flotilla in 1775 and to the Black Sea Fleet in 1783, renamed Nikita Muchenik ("Никита Мученик") 1788, converted to bombard ship 1788, BU after 1791
- Severnyi Oriol ("Северный Орёл", ex-British ?, 1752) - Purchased in Britain 1770, served at the Aegean Sea in 1770–1775 and in 1776–1779, converted to transport 1780, BU 1790
- Grigorii ("Григорий") – Purchased in Archipelago 1770, served at the Aegean Sea in 1771–1774 and in 1776–1779, visited Spain 1782, BU after 1786
- Paros 10 ("Парос") – Purchased in Archipelago 1770, served at the Aegean Sea 17701–1775, BU 190
- Pobeda 10 ("Победа") – Purchased in Archipelago 1770, served at the Aegean Sea 1771–1775, wrecked at the Crimea coast 1775
- Sviatoi Nikolai 26 ("Святой Николай", ex-Greek, voluntary joined to the Russian Archipelago Squadron of count Alexey Orlov and commissioned 1770) – Served at the Aegean Sea in 1770–1775, bombed Beirut 1773, transferred to the Azov Flotilla 1775, visited France 1781 and 1783, BU after 1788
- Sviatoi Pavel 22 ("Святой Павел") – Purchased in Livorno 1770, served at the Aegean Sea in 1770–1775 and Mediterranean Sea in 1775–1779, bombed Turkish Damietta & Beirut in 1772–1773, visited Morocco 1778, BU 1782
- Slava 16 ("Слава") – Purchased in Archipelago 1770, served at the Aegean Sea 1770–1775, bombed Beirut 1773, sold in Livorno 1776
- Fiodor ("Фёдор") – Purchased in Archipelago 1770, served at the Aegean Sea 1770–1771, sunk from leak 1771
- Uliss ("Улисс") – Purchased in Archipelago, served at the Aegean Sea 1771–1775, last mentioned 1774
- Zapasnyi ("Запасный") – Purchased in Archipelago 1772, served at the Aegean Sea 1772–1775, BU after 1782
- Konstantsiya 22 ("Констанция") – Purchased in Archipelago 1772, served at the Aegean Sea in 1772–1775 and in 1776–1779, visited Morocco 1778, BU 1787
- Pomoschnyi 20 ("Помощный") – Purchased in Archipelago 1772, served at the Aegean Sea 1772–1775, BU after 1783
- Ungaria 26 ("Унгария", ex-Austrian?, 1766) - Purchased in Livorno 1775, BU 1796
- Bohemia 26 ("Богемия", ex-Austrian?, 1768) - Purchased in Livorno 1775, Visited Spain 1782, BU 1796
- Pavel 32 ("Павел", 1773, A) – Served at the Mediterranean Sea 1773–1779, BU 1791

==== Astafii-class (16 units) ====
- Astafii 32 ("Астафий", 1773, A) – BU 1793
- Nataliya 32 ("Наталия", 1773, A) – Served at the Mediterranean Sea 1773–1779, wrecked ath the North Sea 1779
- Liogkii 32 ("Лёгкий", 1773, A) – visited Spain 1782, BU 1793
- Stchastlivyi 32 ("Счастливый", 1774, A) – BU 1793
- Sviatoi Mikhail 32 ("Святой Михаил", 1774, A) – Visited Spain 1782, BU 1796
- Pospeshnyi 32 ("Поспешный", 1774, A) – BU 1791
- Aleksandr 32 ("Александр", 1778, A) – Visited Portugal 1780, BU 1804
- Voin 32 ("Воин", 1778, A) – Visited Italy 1781–82, BU 1804
- Mariya 32 ("Мария", 1778, A) – Visited Italy 1781–82, BU 1804
- Patrikii 32 ("Патрикий", 1779, A) – Visited Italy 1781-84 BU, converted to transport 1801
- Simion 32 ("Симион", 1779, A) – Visited Italy 1781–82, BU 1803
- Nadezhda 32 ("Надежда", 1781, A) – DU 1799
- Slava 32 ("Слава", 1781, A) – Visited Italy 1782–84, converted to harbour vessel 1799
- Voz‘mislav 32 ("Возьмислав", 1783, A) - Wrecked 1788
- Podrazhislav 32 ("Подражислав", 1783, A) – Last mentioned 1796
- Nadezhda Blagopoluchiya 32 ("Надежда Благополучия", 1786, A) – Last mentioned 1798
- Gektor 26 ("Гектор", 1781) – Captured by Sweden in 1788 at the very beginning of Russo-Swedish War (1788–1790) (her captain know nothing about the hostile intentions of Swedes), renamed HMS Hector, BU 1818
- Mstislavets 44 ("Мстиславец", 1784, A) – Last mentioned 1794
- Yaroslavets 35 ("Ярославец", 1784, A) – Captured by Sweden in 1788 at the very beginning of Russo-Swedish War (1788–1790) (her captain know nothing about the hostile intentions of Swedes), renamed HMS Jarislawiz, re-captured by Russia at the Battle of Vyborg Bay (1790), renamed Yaroslavets ("Ярославец") BU 1799
- Riga 16 ("Рига", 1784) – BU 1791
- Premislav 36 ("Премислав", 1785, A) – Last mentioned 1793

==== Briachislav-class (8 units) ====
- Briachislav 44/38 ("Брячислав", 1785, A) – Served at the North Sea 1793, BU 1804
- Arkhangel Gavriil 44/38 ("Архангел Гавриил", 1787, A) – BU after 1799
- Pomoschnyi 44/38 ("Помощный", 1788, A) – Served at the North Sea 1793, BU after 1799
- Kronstadt 44/38 ("Кронштадт", 1789, A) – Visited Britain 1795–1796, BU after 1800
- Arkhipelag 44/38 ("Архипелаг", 1789, A) – Served at the North Sea 1793, visited Britain 1795–1797, BU 1809
- Narva 44/38 ("Нарва", 1790, A) – Visited Britain in 1794,1795–1797 & 1798–1799, BU 1815
- Revel‘ 44/38 ("Ревель", 1790, A) - Visited Britain in 1795–1796, BU after 1805
- Riga 44/38 ("Рига", 1790, A) – Visited Britain in 1795–1797 & 1798–1800, BU 1811

==== Arkhangel Mikhail-class (3 units) ====
Built according to drawings of ex-Swedish frigate HMS Venus, which had designed by F. af Chapman

- Arkhangel Mikhail 44 ("Архангел Михаил", 1791, A) – Served at the North Sea 1793, visited Britain 1795–1796, wrecked 1796
- Rafail 44 ("Рафаил", 1791, A) – Visited Britain 1795–1796 & 1799–1800 BU 1804
- Stchastlivyi 44 ("Счастливый", 1798, A) – Visited Britain 1798–1800, hulked 1810, BU after 1813
- anonymous – BU on slip 1795
- Emmanuil 40 ("Эммануил", 1797) – BU 1825
- Emprenabl‘ 16 ("Эмпренабль", 1797, court in Gatchina) – BU c. 1800
- Pospeshnyi 36/38 ("Поспешный", 1798, A) – Served at the Mediterranean Sea 1798–1800, transferred to the Black Sea Fleet 1800, BU after 1809
- Kil‘duin 32 ("Кильдюин", 1798, A; ex- 24-gun transport, converted to 32-gun frigate 1805) - Served at the Adriatic Sea 1805–1807, interned by Britain 1808, released and sold to Britain 1813

==== Tikhvenskaya Bogoroditsa-class (2 units) ====
Built according to improved drawings of ex-Swedish frigate HSwMS Venus, designed by F. af Chapman

- Tikhvenskaya Bogoroditsa 44 ("Тихвенская Богородица", 1799, A) – Visited Britain 1799–1800, served at the North Sea 1804, BU 1819
- Feodosii Totemskii 44 ("Феодосий Тотемский", 1799, A) – Visited Britain 1799–1800, BU 1819

==== Speshnyi-class (34 units) ====
The design Speshnyi class proved highly successful with the result that the Russian Navy built 34 over several decades. The first 11 were built over a period of 24 years. The first three were built before 1810, and three more were built towards the end of the Napoleonic Wars. These last three were built of larch and pine, a decision that sacrificed durability for speed and cost of construction. As a result, the Russian Navy sold these three, and some other frigates, to Spain in 1818. The last five of the initial eleven were laid down between 1818 and 1823. The Great Flood of 1824 damaged three, but the Navy salvaged them, and two (Provoryni (1820) and Konstantin (1824)), fought at the battle of Navarino. By 1831 all of the first 11 had been captured, wrecked, or broken up, with the exception of Konstantin. She was hulked in 1837 and finally broken up in 1848. Between 1825 and 1844 the Navy had another 23 built.

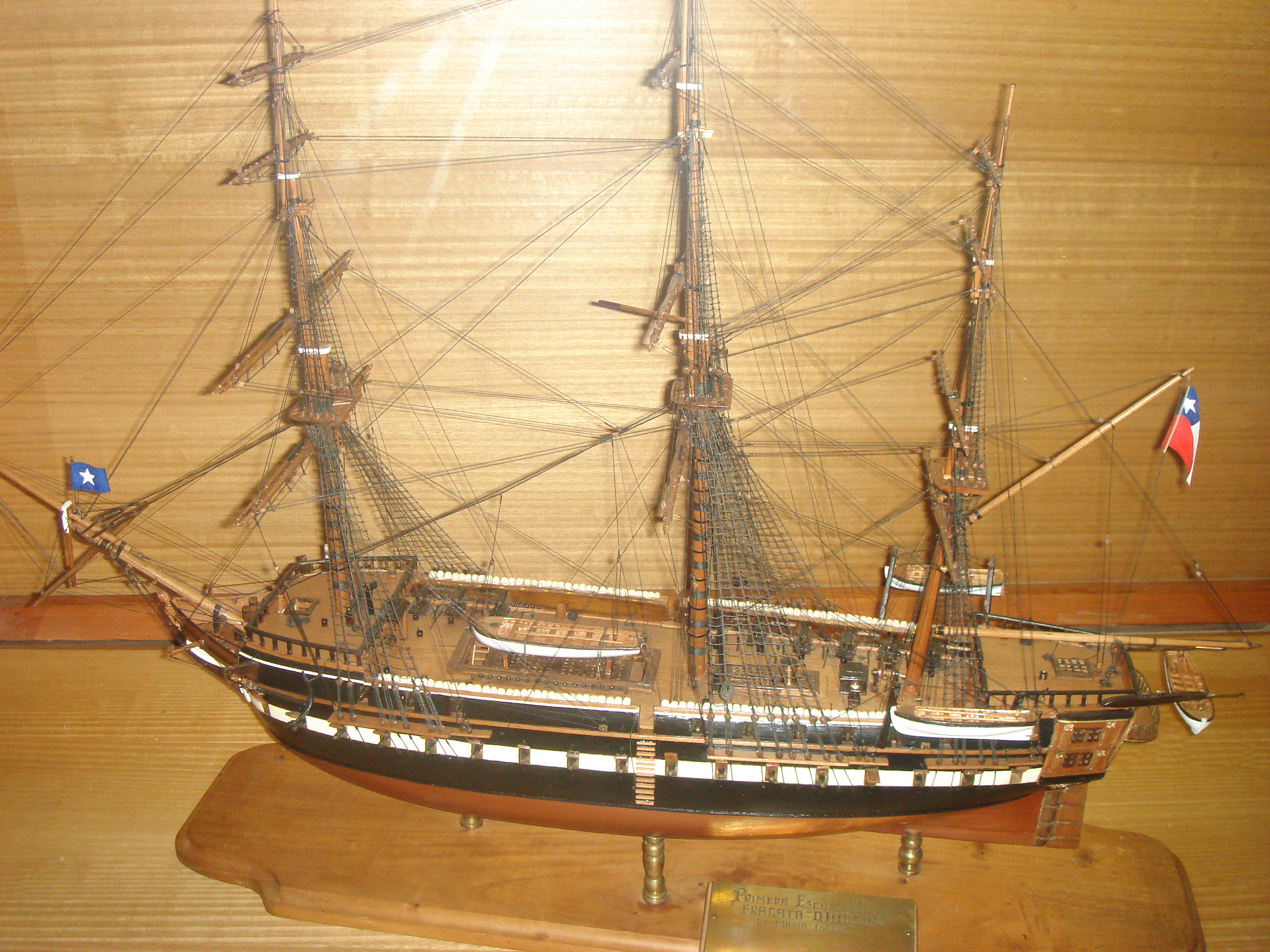
Model of the frigate O'Higgins from the Museo Naval y Marítimo of the Chilean Navy

First 11 units

- Speshnyi 44/50 ("Спешный", 1801, A) – Was the fastest frigate of the contemporary Baltic Fleet, captured by Britain at Portsmouth harbour in 1807 because her captain was not informed of the beginning of Anglo-Russian War (1807–1812)
- Liogkii 38 ("Лёгкий", 1803, A) – Served at the Adriatic Sea 1806–1807, sold to France at Trieste 1809. Captured by the British Royal Navy in 1811.
- Neva 28 ("Нева", 1805) – BU 1829
- Geroi 48 ("Герой", 1807, A) – Wrecked 1808
- Argus 44/50 ("Аргус", 1807, A) – Wrecked 1808
- Bystryi 44/50 ("Быстрый", 1807, A) – BU 1827
- Merkurii 44 ("Меркурий", 1815) – Visited Britain 1816, sold to Spain 1818, renamed Mercurio, scrapped in Cadiz in 1820.
- Patrikii 44 ("Патрикий", 1816, A) – Sold to Spain 17 August 1817, transferred in 1818, renamed Maria Isabel, captured by Chile in 1818, renamed O'Higgins, sold to Argentina in 1826, renamed Buenos Aires, sunk in Cape Horn in 1826.
- Liogkii 44 ("Лёгкий", 1816) – Sold to Spain 1818, renamed Ligeria, sunk in Santiago de Cuba in 1822
- Patrikii 44 ("Патрикий", 1819, A) – BU 1827

Second 23 units

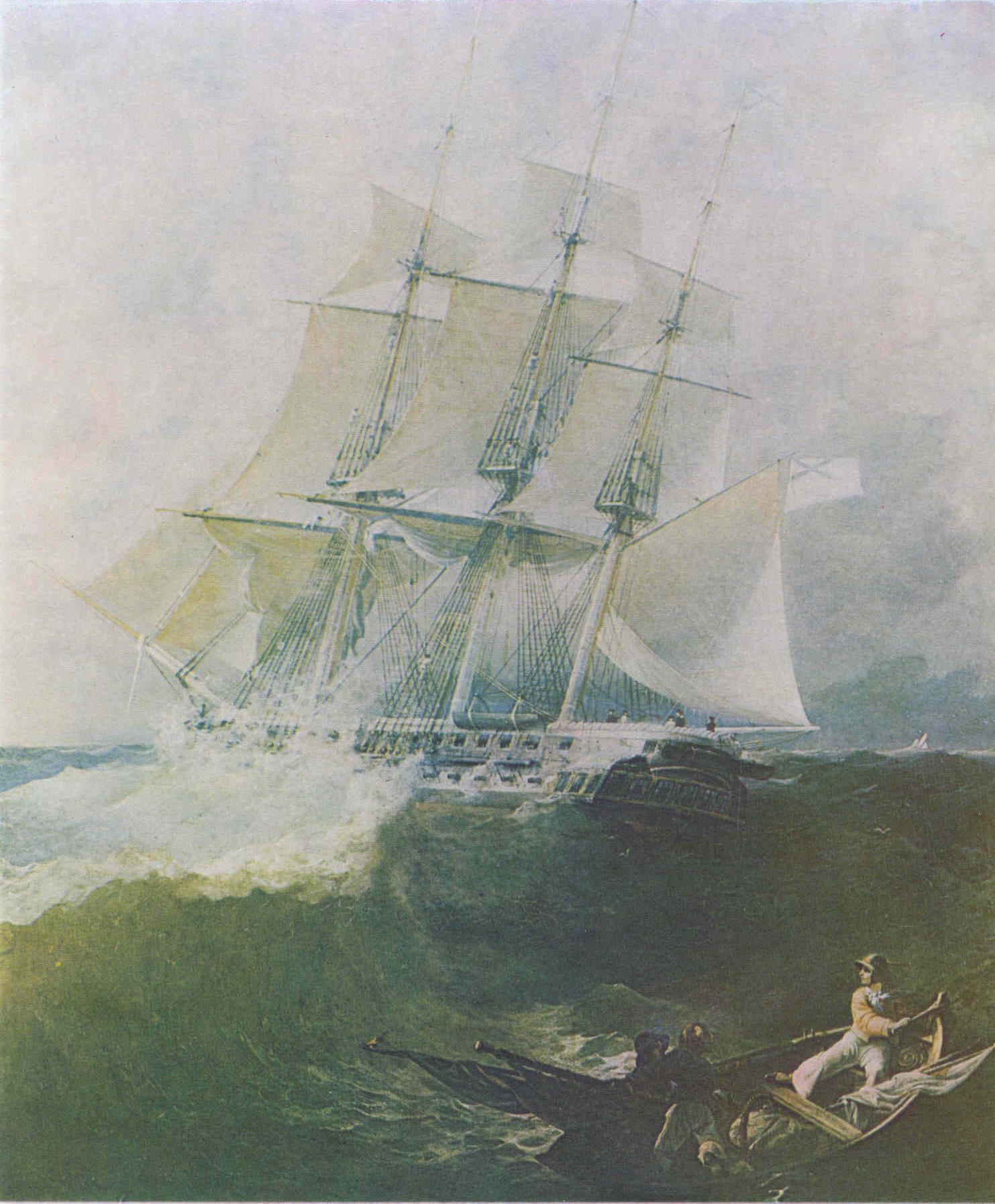
44-gun frigate Avrora (1835)

- Merkurii 44 ("Меркурий", 1820, A) – Visited Britain 1827, BU 1829
- Provornyi 44 ("Проворный", 1820) – Visited France 1824, served at the Mediterranean Sea 1827–1828, BU 1831
- Vestovoi 44 ("Вестовой", 1822, A) – Wrecked 1827
- Konstantin 44/48 ("Константин", 1824, A) – Visited Britain 1826, served at the Mediterranean Sea 1827–1830, BU 1848
- Aleksandra 44/54 ("Александра", 1826, A) – Served at the Aegean Sea 1828–1830, BU 1845
- Mariya 44/54 ("Мария", 1827, A) – Served at the Aegean Sea 1828–1830, hulked as depot 1847
- Ol‘ga 44/54 ("Ольга", 1827, A) - Served at the Aegean Sea 1828–1830, U 1849
- Kniaginia Lovitch 44/54 ("Княгиня Лович", 1828) – Served at the Aegean Sea 1828–1833, flagship of rear admiral Pyotr Rikord during the Civil conflict in Greece (1831–1833), transferred to the Black Sea Fleet 1833, hulked 1837
- Elisaveta 44/63 ("Елизавета", 1828) – Served at the Aegean Sea 1829–1831, hulked as depot 1838
- Ekaterina 44/56 ("Екатерина", 1828) – BU 1854
- Anna 44/54 ("Анна", 1829) – Served at the Aegean Sea 1831–1833, transferred to the Black Sea Fleet 1833, hulked 1838
- Prints Oranskii 44/54 ("Принц Оранский", 1829) – Renamed Korol‘ Niderlandskii ("Король Нидерландский") 1841, hulked 1854, BU c. 1858
- Neva 44/54 ("Нева", 1829) – Hulked as depot 1837
- Venus ("Венус") (ex-Skoryi ("Скорый") – renamed on slip) 44/64 (1829, A) – Hulked 1852
- Bellona 44/54 ("Беллона", 1830) – Hulked as depot 1837
- Yunona 44/54 ("Юнона", 1830) – Hulked as depot 1845
- Pomona 44/54 ("Помона", 1830) – BU 1848
- Tserera 44/54 ("Церера", 1830) – Hulked 1854, Sold for BU 1859
- Kastor 44/52 ("Кастор", 1831, A) – Voyaged to the Mediterranean Sea 1856–1857, decommissioned 1863, BU 1865
- Amfitrida 44/52 ("Амфитрида", 1832, A) – Scuttled to protect Kronstadt harbour 1859
- Prozerpina 44/56 ("Прозерпина", 1831) – BU 1855
- Diana 44/56 ("Диана", 1832) – Hulked as depot 1850, BU 1854
- Avrora or Aurora 44/56 ("Аврора", 1835) – Visited Britain 1844, served at the Northern Pacific 1853–1857, strongest Russian ship in Petropavlosk during the Petropavlosk Action (1854), decommissioned 1861
- Mel‘pomena 44/52 ("Мельпомена", 1836, A) - Last mentioned 1849
- Tsesarevitch ("Цесаревич") (ex-Ekaterina ("Екатерина") – renamed on slip) 44/58 (1841) – Hulked as depot 1858
- Tsesarevna ("Цесаревна") (ex-Bellona ("Беллона") – renamed on slip) 44/58 (1841) – BU 1858
- Konstantin 44/58 ("Константин, 1844, A) – Visited Britain 1844, BU 1860

==== Amfitrida-class (7 units) ====
- Amfitrida 44 ("Амфитрида". 1807) – Visited France 1810, damaged during flood in Kronstadt (1824), BU 1828
- Avtroil 44 ("Автроил", 1811) – Sold to Spain 1818, renamed Astrolabio, scrapped in 1820.
- Arkhipelag 44 ("Архипелаг", 1811) – Visited Britain in 1812–1814, France and Netherlands in 1814–1815, damaged during flood in Kronstadt (1824), BU 1828
- Argus 44 ("Аргус", 1813) – Visited France 1817, damaged during flood in Kronstadt (1824), BU 1828
- Diana 44 ("Диана", 1818, A) – Visited Britain 1827, BU 1830
- Avtroil 44 ("Автроил", 1819) – Hulked as depot 1827
- Liogkiy 44 ("Лёгкий", 1819) – Hulked as depot 1827

==== Kastor-class (2 units) ====
- Kastor 36 ("Кастор", 1807) – Served at the North Sea 1813, BU 1718
- Poluks 36 ("Полукс", 1807) – Wrecked 1809 (140 men lost)
- Venera 48 ("Венера", 1808) – Reconstruct to 2-deck 56-gun frigate 1810, Visited Britain 1812–1813, BU 1829
- Sveaborg 36 ("Свеаборг", 1808) – Served at the North Sea 1813–1814, damaged during flood in Kronstadt (1824), BU 1828
- Poluks 32 ("Полукс", 1812) – Served at the North Sea 1813, damaged during flood in Kronstadt (1824), BU 1828
- Rossiya 24 ("Россия", 1814) – First ship of Russian Guards Naval Depot, renamed Ekateringof ("Екатерингоф") 1827, hulked as depot 1831
- Neva 28 ("Нева", 1816) – BU 1830

==== Pomona-class (2 units) ====
- Pomona 24 ("Помона", 1817, A) – BU 1829
- Pomoschnyi 24 ("Помощный", 1821, A) – Wrecked 1829

==== Provornyi-class (8 units) ====
- Provornyi 36 ("Проворный", 1816, A) – Sold to Spain 1818, renamed Viva, scrapped in 1820.
- Pospeshnyi 36 ("Поспешный", 1816) – Sold to Spain 1818, renamed Pronta, sunk in Portobelo (Panamá) in 1820.
- Gektor 36 ("Гектор", 1817) – Damaged during flood in Kronstadt (1824), BU 1828
- Kreyser 36 ("Крейсер", 1821, A) – Sailed to "Russian America" 1822–1825, visited Britain 1827, BU 1831
- Aleksandr Nevskii 36 ("Александр Невский", 1821) – Converted to transport and renamed Wind-hound ("Винд-хунд") 1825, BU 1829
- Kastor 36 ("Кастор", 1823) – Served at the Mediterranean Sea 1827–1829, BU 1830
- Wind-hound ("Винд-хунд", 1823, A) – Damaged during flood in Kronstadt (1824), decommissioned 1826
- Elena 36 ("Елена", 1825, A) – Visited Britain 1826, served at the Mediterranean Sea 1827–1829, hulked 1835
- Aleksandr Nevskii 44/62 ("Александр Невский", ex- 74-gun ship, 1826, cut down as 44-gun frigate 1732) – BU 1847

==== Pallada-class (2 units) ====
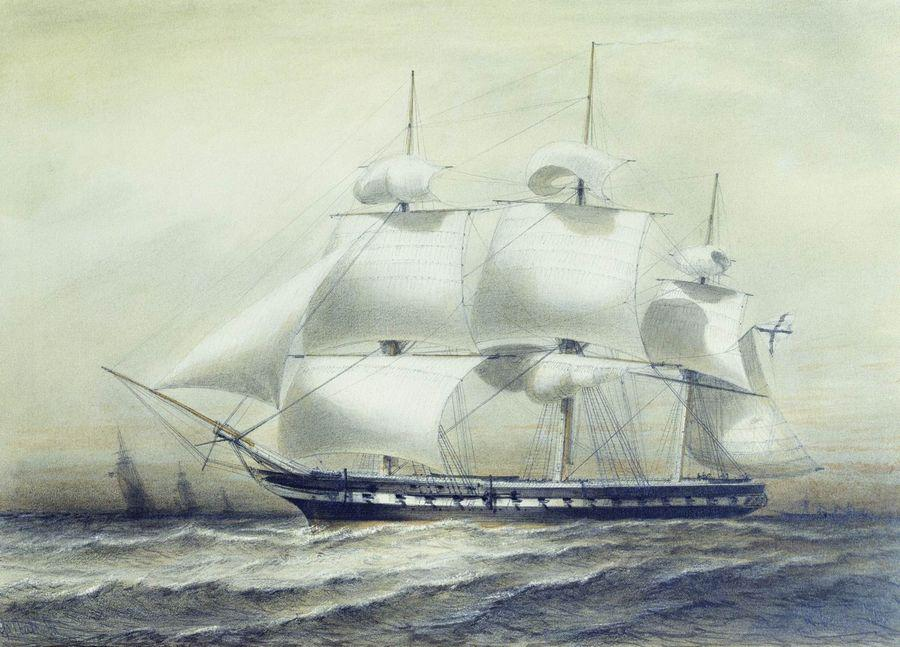
Frigate Pallada (1832).

Built according to improved drawings of HMS President (1800)

- Pallada 44/52 ("Паллада", 1832) – Visited Britain 1847 and Portugal 1849–1850, served at the Northern Pacific in 1852–1856, flagship of Japanese diplomatic mission of vice-admiral count Yevfimy Putyatin, scuttled to prevent capture in Emperor's Harbour 1856
- Diana 44/52 ("Диана", 1852, A) – Served at the Northern Pacific in 1853–1856 consisting of Japanese diplomatic mission of vice-admiral count Yevfimy Putyatin, severely damaged after the 1854 Ansei-Tōkai earthquake and tsunami, sunk in a storm in Shimoda Bay 1855
- Narva 58 ("Нарва", ex- 74-gun ship, 1846, cut down as frigate 1855) – Decommissioned 1863
- Borodino 58 ("Бородино", ex- 74-gun ship, 1850, cut down as frigate 1855) – Decommissioned 1863
- Vilagosh 58 ("Вилагош", ex- 74-gun ship, 1851, cut down as frigate 1855) – Decommissioned 1863
- Sysoi Velikii 58 ("Сысой Великий", ex- 74-gun ship, 1849, cut down as frigate 1855) – Decommissioned 1863

=== Frigates of the Azov Flotilla (1770–1783) of Catherine the Great ===
==== Pervyi-class (2 units) ====
The only two frigates, participated the Russo-Turkish War (1768–1774) consisting of Azov Flotilla

- Pervyi 32 ("Первый", 1771) – Wrecked 1775
- Vtoroi 32 ("Второй", 1771) – Transferred to the Black Sea Fleet 1783, BU 1783

==== Tretyi-class (2 units) ====
- Tretiy 58 ("Третий", 1773) – Burnt 1779
- Chetviortyi 58 ("Четвёртый", 1773) – Last mentioned 1778

==== Piatyi-class (3 units) ====
- Piatyi 42 ("Пятый", 1774) – Transferred to the Black Sea Fleet 1783, BU 1785
- Shestoi 42 ("Шестой", 1774) – Transferred to the Black Sea Fleet 1783, BU 1785
- Sed‘moi 42 ("Седьмой", 1777) - Transferred to the Black Sea Fleet and renamed Kherson 1783, converted to floating battery and renamed Vasilii Velikii ("Василий Великий") 1788, wrecked 1788

==== Vos‘moi-class (9 units) ====
- Vos‘moi 44 ("Восьмой", 1778) - Transferred to the Black Sea Fleet and renamed Ostoroznyi ("Осторожный") 1783, BU 1790
- Deviatyi 44 ("Девятый", 1779) – Transferred to the Black Sea Fleet and renamed Pospeshnyi ("Поспешный") 1783, decommissioned 1786, BU after 1790
- Desiatyi 44 ("Десятый", 1779) – Transferred to the Black Sea Fleet and renamed Krym 1783, lost at sea 1787
- Odinnadtsatyi 44 ("Одиннадцатый"Ю 1779) – Transferred to the Black Sea Fleet and renamed Khrabryi ("Храбрый") 1783, BU after 1788
- Dvenadtsatyi 44 ("Двенадцатый", 1782) – Transferred to the Black Sea Fleet and renamed Strela ("Стрела") 1783, rearmed and renamed as 40-gun frigate Ioann Voinstvennik ("Иоанн Воинственник") 1788, BU after 1792
- Trinadtsatyi 44 ("Тринадцатый", 1782) – Transferred to the Black Sea Fleet and renamed Pobeda 1783, rearmed and renamed as 40-gun frigate Matvei Evangelist ("Матвей Евангелист") 1788, BU after 1791

=== Frigates of the Black Sea Fleet (1783–1855) ===
==== Vos‘moi-class (last 3 units) ====
- Chetyrnadtsatyi 44 ("Четырнадцатый", 1783) – Renamed Perun ("Перун"), 1783, rearmed and renamed as 40-gun frigate Amvrosii Mediolanskii ("Амвросий Медиоланский") 1788, hulked as depot 1791
- Piatnadtsatyi 44 ("Пятнадцатый", 1783) – Renamed Liogkii ("Лёгкий") 1783, rearmed and renamed as 40-gun frigate Kirill Belozerskii ("Кирилл Белозерский") 1788, converted to floating crane 1791
- Shestnadtsatyii 44 ("Шестнадцатый", 1783) – Renamed Skoryi ("Скорый") 1783, rearmed and renamed as 40-gun frigate Fedot Muchenik ("Федот Мученик") 1788, last mentioned 1790
- Vestnik 40/32 ("Вестник", ex-merchant vessel, 1781, converted to 40-gun frigate 1783) – Renamed Arkhangel Gavriil ("Архангел Гавриил", 1788, BU after 1790
- Grigorii Bogoslov ("Григорий Богослов") (ex-merchant vessel Boristhen ("Бористен"), 1781, converted to frigate 1788) – BU after 1791
- Ioann Zlatoust ("Иоанн Златоуст") (ex-merchant vessel Taganrog ("Таганрог"), converted to frigate 1788) – damaged by ice and sunk in 1788/89
- Grigorii Velikiya Armenii 26 ("Григорий Великия Армении") (ex-merchant vessel Pchela ("Пчела"), 1782, converted to frigate 1788) – Last mentioned 1791
- Antonii ("Антоний") (ex-pink № 1, 1784, converted to frigate 1788) - Burnt 1791
- Feodosii ("Феодосий") (ex-pink № 2, 1784, converted to frigate 1788) - Last mentioned 1788
- Sergii Chudotvorets 20 ("Сергий Чудотворец") (ex-cutter № 1, converted to frigate 1788) - BU after 1802
- Nikolai Chudotvorets 20 ("Николай Чудотворец") (ex-cutter № 2, convert to frigate 1788) - Last mentioned 1790
- Sviatoi Georgii Pobedonosets 50/54 ("Святой Георгий Победоносец", 1785) – Classified as 50-gun ship 1788–1793, BU after 1800
- Taganrog 40 ("Таганрог", 1785) – BU after 1795

==== Kinburn-class (3 units) ====
- Kinburn 40 ("Кинбурн", 1786) – Renamed Pokrov Sviatoi Bogoroditsy ("Покров Святой Богородицы") 1788, hulked 1790
- Berislav 40 ("Берислав", 1786) – Renamed Luka Evangelist ("Лука Евангелист") 1788, BU 1790
- Fanagoriya 40 ("Фанагория", 1786) – Renamed Prepodobnyi Nestor ("Преподобный Нестор") 1788, BU after 1795

==== Apostol Andrei-class (2 units) ====
50-gun battlefrigates, 2-deckers

- Apostol Andrei 50 ("Апостол Андрей", 1786) – Classified as 50-gun ship 1789–1793, converted to floating crane 1800
- Aleksandr Nevskii 50 ("Александр Невский", 1787) – Classified as 50-gun ship 1789–1793, flagship of rear admiral count Nikolai Mordvinov in 1787 and rear admiral Fyodor Ushakov in 1790 during the Russo-Turkish War (1787–1792), voyaged to the Adriatic Sea 1799, last mentioned 1799

==== Piotr Apostol-class (6 units) ====
46-gun battlefrigates

- Piotr Apostol 46/44 ("Пётр Апостол", 1788) – Classified as 46-gun ship 1789–1793, BU after 1799
- Ioann Bogoslov 46/44 ("Иоанн Богослов", 1788) – Classified as 46-gun ship 1789–1793, burnt 1794
- Tsar‘ Konstantin 46/44 ("Царь Константин", 1788) - Classified as 46-gun ship 1789–1793, wrecked 1799 (399 men lost including rear admiral I. T. Ovtsyn)
- Fiodor Stratilat 46/44 ("Фёдор Стратилат", 1790) – Classified as 46-gun ship until 1793, wrecked 1799 (268 men lost)
- Soshestviye Sviatogo Dukha ("Сошествие Святого Духа") (ex-Sviataya Troitsa ("Святая Троица") – renamed on slip) 46/44 (1791) – Classified as 46-gun ship until 1793, served at the Adriatic Sea 1798–1802, last mentioned 1802
- Kazanskaya Bogoroditsa 46/44 ("Казанская Богородица", 1791) – Classified as 46-gun ship until 1793, served at the Adriatic Sea 1798–1802, last mentioned 1802
- Nikolai Belomorskii 20 ("Николай Беломорский")- ex-xebec, purchased in Eastern Mediterranean 1789, served in Aegean Sea 1789–1792, transferred to the Black Sea Fleet 1792, voyaged to the Adriatic Sea 1801 and 1804, BU after 1808
- Sviatoi Matvei 16 ("Святой Матвей") – ex-privateer corvette of Lambros Katsonis Flotilla on Russian service, served at the Aegean Sea 1790–1792, commissioned to the Black Sea Fleet as 16-gun frigate 1792, BU 1804
- Navarkhia ("Навархия") (also Vozneseniye Gospodne, "Преображение Господне") 46/40 (1790) – Classified as 46-gun ship until 1793, served at the Adriatic Sea 1798–1802, last mentioned 1802
- Sviatoi Nikolai 44/46/50 ("Святой Николай", 1790) – Classified as 46-gun ship until 1793, served at the Adriatic Sea 1798–1802, sold for BU in Naples 1802
- Grigorii Velikiya Armenii 60 ("Григорий Великия Армении", 1791) – Served at the Adriatic Sea 1798–1803, converted to hospital vessel in Corfu 1805, sold to France in Corfu 1809
- Ioann Zlatoust 32 ("Иоанн Златоуст", 1791) – Voyaged to the Adriatic Sea in 1800 & 1804, last mentioned 1815
- Pospeshnyi 32 ("Поспешный", 1793) – Voyaged to the Adriatic Sea 1799–1800, wrecked near Bosporus 1800
- Stchastlivyi 36 ("Счастливый", 1793) – Served at the Adriatic Sea 1798–1800, BU 1805
- Liogkii 26 ("Лёгкий", 1793) – Voyaged to the Adriatic Sea 1800, BU 1804
- Mikhail 50/48 ("Михаил", 1796) – Served at the Adriatic Sea 1798–1803 & 1804–1807, flagship of captain A. Sorokin in 1799, sold to France in Trieste 1809
- Nazaret 44 ("Назарет", 1800) – Served at the Adriatic Sea in 1802–1803 & 1805–1806, BU after 1813
- Krepkii 54 ("Крепкий", 1801) – Served at the Adriatic Sea 1804–1806, BU after 1812
- Liliya ("Лилия", 1806) – Last mentioned 1821

==== Voin-class (2 units) ====
- Voin 32 ("Воин", 1804) – Last mentioned 1821
- Afrika 32 ("Африка", 1811) – Last mentioned 1811
- Minerva 44 ("Минерва", 1811) – Converted to harbour vessel 1825

==== Vezul-class (2 units) ====
- Vezul 32 ("Везул", 1813) – Wrecked 1817
- Speshnyi 32 ("Спешный", 1813) – BU 1830
- Evstafii 44/48 ("Евстафий", 1817) – Last mentioned 1829
- Flora 44/48 ("Флора", 1818) – BU after 1835
- Pospeshnyi 44/52 ("Поспешный", 1821) – BU 1839
- Shtandart 44/60 ("Штандарт", 1824) – Visited Egypt 1832, Hulked as depot 1841
- Rafail 36/44 ("Рафаил", 1828) – Captured by Turkey in 1829 during the Russo-Turkish War (1828–1829) (the reason ship name "Rafail" was prohibited to use in the Russian Navy in future), renamed Fazlullah, destroyed by Russian ships at the Battle of Sinop 1853

==== Tenedos-class (6 units) ====
According to their designer, admiral Alexey Greig, this frigates only by a negligible margin inferiored to 74-gun ships of the line

- Tenedos 60 ("Тенедос", 1828) – Hulked 1842
- Erivan‘ 60 ("Эривань", 1829) - Hulked 1837
- Arkhipelag 60 ("Архипелаг", 1829) – Hulked 1838
- Varna 60 ("Варна", 1830) – Wrecked 1838
- Enos 60 ("Энос", 1831) – Hulked 1845
- Burgas 60 ("Бургас", 1832) – Hulked 1842
- Agatopol‘ 60 ("Агатополь", 1834) - BU 1853
- Brailov 44/46 ("Браилов", 1836) – BU 1851
- Flora 44 ("Флора", 1839) – Won an action with 3 Turkish steamers (1853), scuttled to protect the harbour in 1854 during the Siege of Sevastopol
- Mesemvriya 60 ("Месемврия", 1840) – Scuttled to protect the harbour in 1855 during the Siege of Sevastopol
- Sizopol‘ 60/54 ("Сизополь", 1841) - Scuttled to protect the harbour in 1854 during the Siege of Sevastopol
- Midiya 60 ("Мидия", 1843) – Scuttled to protect the harbour in 1855 during the Siege of Sevastopol
- Kagul 44 ("Кагул", 1843) – Converted to hospital ship 1854, scuttled to protect the harbour in 1855 during the Siege of Sevastopol
- Kovarna 52 ("Коварна", 1845) – Destroyed by coastal artillery fire during the Siege of Sevastopol 1855
- Kulevtchi 60 ("Кулевчи", 1847) – Scuttled in Sevastopol in 1855, when Russian troops abandoned the city

=== Frigates of the Caspian Flotilla ===
==== № 1-class (3 units) ====
- № 1 20 (1779) - BU 1789
- № 2 20 (1779) - BU 1786
- № 3 20 (1780) - BU 1787

==== Kavkaz-class (5 units) ====
- Kavkaz 20 ("Кавказ", 1784) – Bombed Baku in 1791, BU 1797
- Astrakhan‘ 20 ("Астрахань", 1784) - BU 1798
- Kizliar 20 ("Кизляр", 1785) – Last mentioned 1785
- № 1 20 (1798) - Bombed Baku to protect Russian merchantmen in 1799, flagship of lieutenant commander Egor Veselago during the Russo-Persian War (1803-1813), BU 1810
- № 2 20 (1798) - BU 1809
- Tsaritsyn 12 ("Царицын", 1795) (rowing) – BU 1808

== Rowing frigates ==
This type of sailing & rowing vessels was intended for the skerries of the Gulf of Finland. These vessels, except for the two Evangelist Mark-class vessels, belonged to the Baltic Rowing (Army) Fleet.

=== Evangelist Mark-class (2 units) ===
- Evangelist Mark 20/22 ("Евангелист Марк", 1773) – BU 1794
- Provornyi 20/22 ("Проворный", 1781) – BU 1789

=== Ekaterina-class (18 units) ===
- Ekaterina 38 ("Екатерина", 1790) – Burnt to prevent capture at the 2nd Battle of Rochensalm (1790), repaired by Swedes and commissioned as HMS Katarina, further future is unknown
- Aleksandr 38 ("Александр", 1790) – Lost at the 2nd Battle of Rochensalm (1790), repaired by Swedes and commissioned as HMS Alexander, further future is unknown
- Aleksandra 38 ("Александра", 1790) – BU 1804
- Elena 38 ("Елена", 1790) – BU 1802
- Konstantin 38 ("Константин", 1790) – Lost at the 2nd Battle of Rochensalm (1790), repaired by Swedes and commissioned as HMS Konstantin, further future is unknown
- Mariya 38 ("Мария", 1790) – Captured by Sweden at the 2nd Battle of Rochensalm (1790), overthrew a few hours after
- Nikolai 38 ("Николай", 1790) – Sank at the 2nd Battle of Rochensalm (1790), found by divers 1948
- Pavel 38 ("Павел", 1790) – BU 1804
- Aleksandr 38 ("Александр", 1792) – BU 1804
- Ekaterina 38 ("Екатерина", 1792) – BU 1804
- Elizaveta 38 ("Елизавета", 1794) – BU 1803
- Mariya 38 ("Мария", 1794) – Wrecked 1796
- Konstantin 38 ("Константин", 1796) – Visited Britain 1799–1800, BU 1808
- Nikolai 38 ("Николай", 1796) – Visited Britain 1799–1800, BU 1809
- Bogoyavleniye Gospodne 38 ("Богоявление Господне", 1798) – Withstood an action with two Swedish frigates near Vasa 1809, hulked 1810, BU 1816
- Emmanuil 38 ("Эммануил", 1796) – Transferred to the Baltic (Sail) Fleet as 24-gun frigate 1804, BU 1817
- Vifleem 38 ("Вифлеем") – BU on slip 1799
- Nazaret 38 ("Назарет") – BU on slip 1799

=== Hemmemas (6 units) ===
A hemmema (Russian pronunciation "gemam") was a Swedish design by Fredrik Henrik af Chapman. It was a type of small rowing frigate for archipelago warfare used by the Swedish archipelago fleet.

- Petergof 32 (" Петергоф", 1808) – BU 1822
- Bodryi 32 ("Бодрый", 1808) – Damaged during flood in Kronstadt (1824), BU 1829
- Neva 32 ("Нева", 1808) – BU 1829
- Sveaborg 32 ("Свеаборг", 1808) – BU 1822
- Torneo 32 ("Торнео", 1808) – BU 1824
- Mirnyi 32 ("Мирный", 1823) – BU after 1834

== Training frigates ==
Built special for naval training. Belonged to the Sea Cadet Corps' Squadron.

- Nadezhda 10 ("Надежда", 1766) (25 cadets) – BU 1774

=== Malyi-class (6 units) ===
95 naval cadets.

- Malyi 24 ("Малый", 1805) – BU after 1820
- Uraniya 24 ("Урания", 1820) – BU 1838
- Rossiya 24 ("Россия", 1825) – BU 1842
- Nadezhda 24 ("Надежда", 1828) – BU 1845
- Otvazhnost‘ 24 ("Отважность", 1834) - BU after 1858
- Postoyanstvo 24 ("Постоянство", 1834) – BU after 1858

=== Vernost‘-class (3 units) ===
75 naval cadets.

- Vernost‘ 24 ("Верность", 1834) - Hulked as floating barracks 1854, BU 1858
- Uspekh 24 ("Успех", 1839) – BU 1855
- Nadezhda 24 ("Надежда", 1845) – BU after 1858

== Prizes (frigates) ==
- Karlskron-Vapen 34 ("Карлскрон-вапен", ex-Swedish HMS Karlskrona Vapen, 1703, captured at the Battle of Osel Island 1719) – BU 1737
- Venker 30 ("Венкер", ex-Swedish HMS Vainqueur, 1720, captured at the Battle of Grengam 1720) – Never commissioned but kept as a memorial, BU 1738
- Dansk-Ern 18/24 ("Данск-Эрн", ex-Danish Svarta Örn, 1715, captured by Sweden in 1717 and renamed HMS Danska Örn, captured by Russians at the Battle of Grengam 1720) – memorial 1728, BU after 1737
- Kisken 22/32 ("Кискен", ex-Swedish HMS Kiskin, 1715, captured at the Battle of Grengam 1720)) – BU 1738
- Stor-Feniks 34/32 ("Стор-Феникс", ex-Swedish HMS Stora Fenix II (Fenix), 1708, captured at the Battle of Grengam 1720)) – BU after 1738
- Brilyant 30 ("Брильянт", ex-French Le Brillant, ?, captured during the Siege of Danzig (1734)) – BU after 1746
- Ul‘riksdal‘ 24 ("Ульриксдаль", ex-Swedish HMS Ulriksdal, 1738, heavily damaged in storm and captured near Reval in 1742 during the Russo-Swedish War (1741–1743)) – BU after 1773
- Arkhipelag 30 ("Архипелаг", ex-Turkish vessel ?, captured in Aegean Sea 1770, converted to Baltic Fleet's frigate) – Served at the Aegean Sea 1770–1775, transferred to the Azov Flotilla 1775, converted to transport vessel 1782, wrecked 1782
- Delos ("Делос", ex-Turkish vessel ?, captured in Aegean Sea 1770, converted to Baltic Fleet's frigate) – Served at the Aegean Sea 1770–1775, sold for BU in Naoussa 1775
- Zeya ("Зея", ex-Turkish vessel ?, captured in Aegean Sea 1770, converted to Baltic Fleet's frigate) – BU in Naoussa 1772
- Milo ("Мило", ex-Turkish vessel ?, captured in Aegean Sea 1770, converted to Baltic Fleet's frigate) – BU in Naoussa 1772
- Naktsiya 22 ("Накция", ex-Turkish vessel ?, captured in Aegean Sea 1770, converted to Baltic Fleet's frigate) – Served at the Aegean Sea 1770–1775, sold for BU in Naoussa 1775
- Tino ("Тино", ex-Turkish vessel ?, captured in Aegean Sea 1770, converted to Baltic Fleet's frigate) – Served at the Aegean Sea 1770–1775, transferred to the Azov Flotilla 1775, last mentioned 1775
- Andro ("Андро", ex-Turkish vessel ?, captured in Aegean Sea 1771, converted to Baltic Fleet's frigate) – BU in Naoussa 1772
- Mikono ("Миконо", ex-Turkish vessel ?, captured in Aegean Sea 1771, converted to Baltic Fleet's frigate) – BU in Naoussa 1772
- Minerva 32 ("Минерва", ex-Turkish vessel ?, captured in Aegean Sea 1771, converted to Baltic Fleet's frigate) – Served at the Aegean Sea 1771–1774, wrecked at the Baltic Sea 1774
- Santorin ("Санторин", ex-Turkish vessel ?, captured in Aegean Sea 1771, converted to Baltic Fleet's frigate) – Wrecked in Mytilene harbour and burnt to protect the capture 1771
- Sviatoi Mark ("Святой Марк", ex-Turkish galley Makroplea, captured at the Dnepr Liman in 1788, converted to frigate) – BU after 1800
- Avtroil 24 ("Автроил", ex-Swedish HMS af Trolle, 1767, captured at the First Battle of Rochensalm (1789)) – Flagship of vice-admiral T. Kozlianonov in the Battle of Vyborg Bay and 2nd Battle of Rochensalm (1790) (2nd flag), served at the Adriatic Sea 1805–1807, sold to France in Venice 1809
- Oden 38/28-gun hemmema ("Оден", ex-Swedish HMS Oden, 1764, captured at the First Battle of Rochensalm (1789), classified as hemmema) – Captured by Sweden at the 2nd Battle of Rochensalm (1790), re-captured by Russia in Sveaborg (1808) and as half-hemmama Oduen ("Одуен") commissioned to the Baltic Rowing Fleet, last mentioned 1808

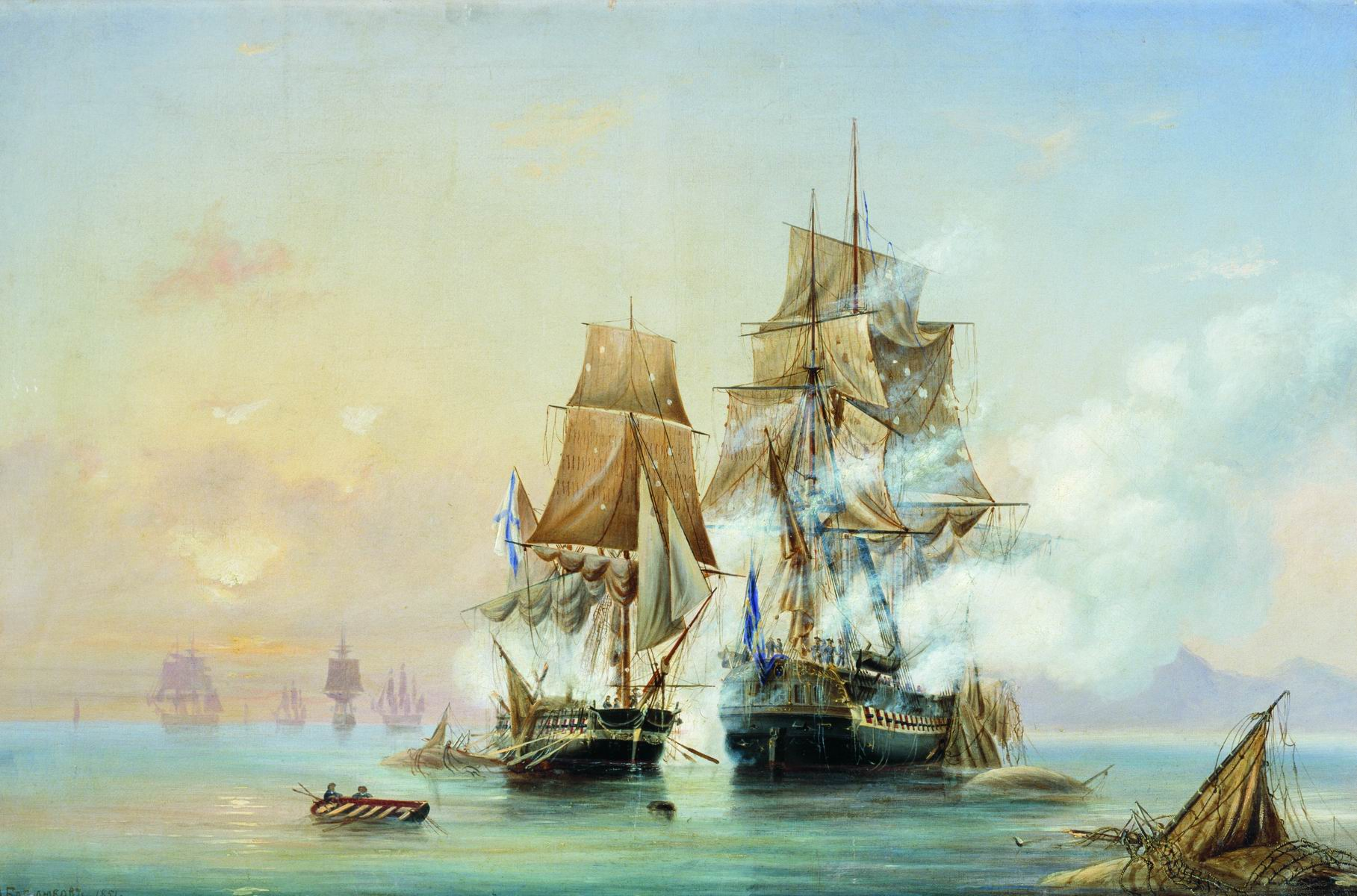
Capturing of Swedish 44-gun frigate Venus by Russian 22-gun cutter Merkuriy of June 1, 1789

- Venus ("Венус", ex-Swedish HMS Venus, 1783, captured in Oslofjord in 1789 during the Russo-Swedish War (1788–1790)) – Distinguished herself in Battle of Vyborg Bay under the command of captain Roman Crown, visited Holland 1793, visited Britain in 1793, 1795–1797 & 1799–1800, served at the Adriatic Sea in 1805–1807 and at the Aegean Sea in 1807, sold to Kingdom of Naples in Palermo to prevent capture 1807
- la Brune (ex-French, ?, captured during Corfu assault (1799) by admiral Fyodor Ushakov's Russo-Turkish Squadron) – Delivered to Turkey, further fate is unknown
- Gel‘gomar 26-gun hemmema ("Гельгомар", ex-Swedish HMS Hjalmar, 1790, captured in Sveaborg 1808, commissioned to Baltic Rowing Fleet) – BU 1829
- Stor-Byorn 26-gun hemmema ("Стор-Бьорн", ex-Swedish HMS Styrbjörn, 1790, captured in Sveaborg 1808, commissioned to Baltic Rowing Fleet) – Flagship of lieutenant commander Ivan Novokshenov at the Battle of Jungfrusund (1808) during the Russo-Swedish War (1808–1809), hulked as floating barracks
- Magubei-Subhan ("Магубей-Субхан", ex-Turkish Mahubey Subham, captured near Penderaklia in 1811 during the Russo-Turkish War (1806–1812)) – BU after 1818

== Bibliography ==
- Veselago F. F. Spisok russkikh voyennykh sudov s 1668 po 1860 god. – Tipographia Morskogo Vedomstva, Saint Petersburg, 1872 (List of Russian naval ships from 1668 to 1860)
- Chernyshev A. A. Rossiyskiy parusnyi flot. Spravochnik. T. I. – Voyenizdat, Moskva, 1997 (Russian Sailing Fleet. Reference-book)
- Russian Warships in the Age of Sail, 1696–1860: Design, Construction, Careers and Fates. John Tredrea and Eduard Sozaev. Seaforth Publishing, 2010. ISBN 978-1-84832-058-1.
- Boyevaya letopis‘ russkogo flota. Khronika vazhneishikh sobytii voyennoi istorii russkogo flota s IX veka po 1917 god. - Voyenizdat, Moskva, 1948. (Combat Annales of the Russian Navy. Chronicle of the Most Important Events of the Russian Navy History from the 9th century up to 1917)
- Mitrofanov V. P., Mitrofanov P. S. Shkoly pod parusami. Uchebnyi parusnyi flot XVIII–XX vekov. – Sudostroyeniye, Leningrad, 1989. (Schools under the Sail. Training Sail Fleet in XVIII–XX cc.)
- Information of Swedish warships by Jan-Erik Karlsson
