= Senyavin =

Senyavin (Russian: Сенявин) (also commonly spelled as Sinyavin) is a Russian noble family (dvoryans), famous for its Imperial Russian Navy officers.

== People ==
- Aleksey Senyavin (1716–1797), Russian admiral
- Dmitry Senyavin, Russian admiral who ranks among the greatest seamen of the Napoleonic Wars
- Ivan Akimovich Senyavin (died 1726), Russian rear admiral, head of the port of Astrakhan
- Ivan Grigoryevich Senyavin (1801–1851), Russian statesman and senator
- Lev Senyavin (1805–1861), Russian statesman and senator
- Naum Senyavin, Russian vice admiral of the Imperial Russian Navy
- Nikolai Senyavin, Russian vice admiral of the Imperial Russian Navy

== Other uses ==
- Russian battleship Admiral Senyavin
- Admiral Senyavin class of battleships
- Senyavin Islands, a group of islands which belong to the Federated States of Micronesia
- Senyavin Strait, a strait in the Bering Sea
