= Konon Zotov =

Russian admiral

- Born: 1690
- Died: November 21, 1742 (aged 51–52)
- Father: Nikita Zotov
- Relatives: Ivan Zotov (Brother)

Konon Nikitich Zotov (Russian: Конон Никитич Зотов) was a Russian rear admiral. He was the son of Nikita Zotov. He was highly valued by Peter the Great. He was also an eminent author of textbooks on shipbuilding and navigation.

== Biography ==
Konon Zotov was born in 1690. He was the son of Nikita Zotov, tutor of Peter the Great.

Zotov began his studies in the Navy Cadet Corps and was also a student at the Kyiv Collegium. In 1704, he went to England to deepen his knowledge. In 1712, Zotov returned to Russia and was immediately promoted to lieutenant. He sailed under the command of Naoum Seniavine in the Gulf of Finland. In 1713 he was commissioned a lieutenant in the Baltic fleet and in 1714 dispatched to Pernau to bring home a newly purchased warship. Later that year he translated on Peter's orders the French naval ordinance of 1689.

In 1715, promoted to Captain lieutenant, Zotov was sent to France to study the French fleet and admiralty's regulation. Before he left, Tsar ordered him to find and translate books related to navy. He also bought paintings and tapestries for a total amount of 147,000 livres. On 23 December 1715, the Tsar wrote to him to look for a historical painter. Upon his return from France, Zotov was promoted to the rank of captain of the 3rd rank.

In 1719, Zotov participated in the Battle of Ösel Island alongside Naum Sinyaven against a Swedish squadron and captured a Swedish frigate, which earned him the promotion of captain of the 2nd rank. In 1720, Zotov was commissioned to draft the regulations for the fleet. He was also sent to Copenhagen to gather naval intelligence. In 1721 he was appointed controller of the Board of the Admiralty.

In 1724, Zotov submitted to the Tsar the first Russian book on naval tactics and practice Conversation between the admiral and the captain about the crew or the complete teaching of how to steer the ship in all cases ( St. Petersburg, 1724, reprinted 1816), where the questions and answers explain essential information on maritime matters, navigation, ship's volition, etc. His next work was a book titled Hunting the Enemy.

In 1726, he was given command of the ship of the line Panteleimon-Victoria, one of the largest in the Baltic, and also compiled the regulations of the lower admiralty court (commercial maritime code). In 1738 he translated the Dutch nautical instructions for the Baltic Sea Fleet with a detailed sea atlas called Maritime Illumination dedicated to Empress Elizabeth Petrovna.

He later rejoined the Admiralty College, where he served, ultimately as general-ekipazhmeister with the rank of rear admiral, until his death. He died on November 10, 1742 (21 November in the Gregorian calendar).
