= Yakov Turgenev =

Russian court jester

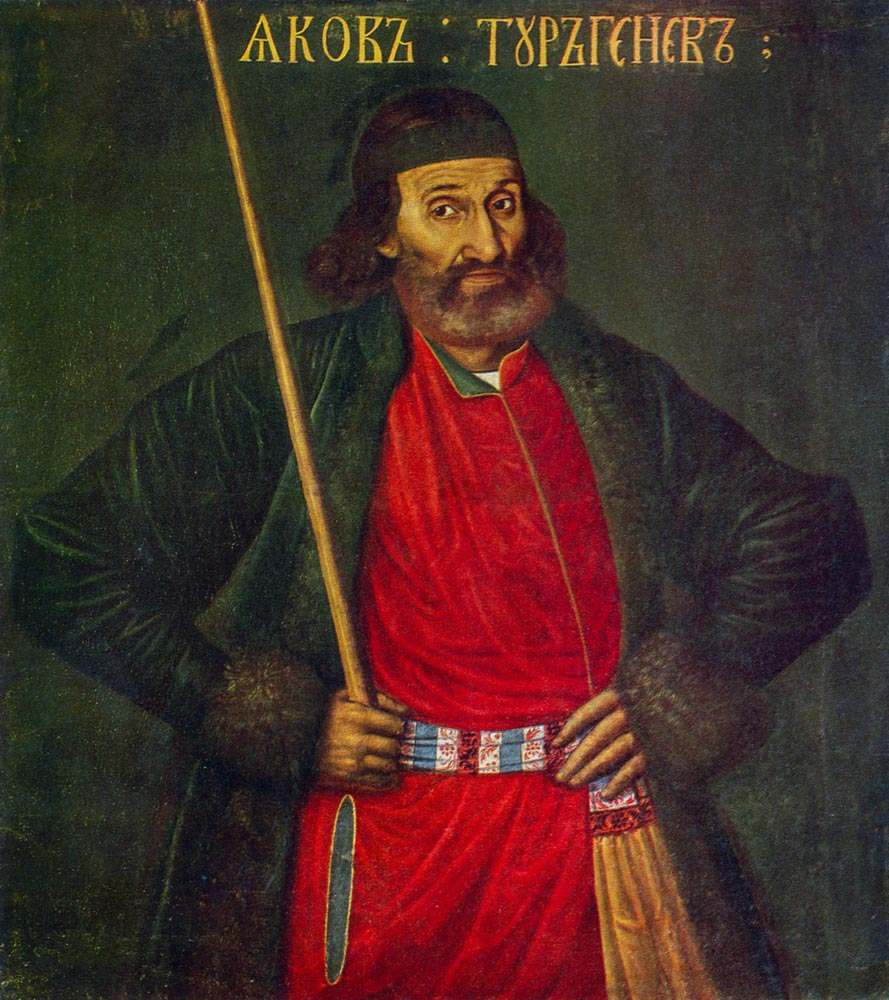

Yakov Fyodorovich Turgenev (Russian: Яков Фёдорович Тургенев) was a court jester to Peter I of Russia, Anatoly Demidov and a Kiev colonel.

== Early life ==
Yakov Turgenev was born in the 17th century in the Russian Empire. His father was Fyodor Vasilievich Turgenev. He had seven grandfathers:

- Peter Nikitich Turgenev
- Gregory Nikitich Turgenev
- Boris Nikitich Turgenev
- Vasily Nikitich Turgenev
- Osip Fedorovich Turgenev
- Vasily Fedorovich Turgenev
- Andrey F. Turgenev

=== Children ===
- Logwin Turgenev — his only son

== Career ==
In 1671 he joined the service of the Reitarska system. In 1683, he was invited to the estate in Vorotynsky County. In 1694, he commanded a company in the Kozhuhovskaya campaign.

In 1700 Peter I ordered Turgenev to hold a wedding parody that was a parody of traditional customs. Ivan Fedorovich Romodanovsky portrayed the king and the queen was played by Ivan Buturlin. At the wedding Turgenev lampooned the boyars, following Peter's speech about cutting the boyars' beards.

== Death ==
Yakov Turgenev died at age 45 during a cruel joke of The All-Joking, All-Drunken Synod of Fools and Jesters, having drunken himself to death.

== Sources ==
- Transfiguration series. Portraits jesters. Author unknown.
