= List of ship launches in 1734 =

The list of ship launches in 1734 includes a chronological list of some ships launched in 1734.

Date	Ship	Class	Builder	Location	Country	Notes
25 January	Beaufort	East Indiaman	John Perry	Blackwall	Great Britain	For British East India Company.
12 March	Wager	East Indiaman	John Buxton	Rotherhithe	Great Britain	For British East India Company.
6 May	Le Bourbon	East Indiaman	Gilles Cambry	Lorient	Kingdom of France	For Compagnie des Indes.
9 May	Dryade	Corvette	Blaise Geslain	Le Havre	Kingdom of France	For French Navy.
May	Chestnaia	Galley		Tavrov	Russia	For Don Military Flotilla.
May	Dobraia	Galley		Tavrov	Russia	For Don Military Flotilla.
May	Khvalnaia	Galley		Tavrov	Russia	For Don Military Flotilla.
May	Laskovaia	Galley		Tavrov	Russia	For Don Military Flotilla.
May	Prevoskhoditelnaia	Galley		Tavrov	Russia	For Don Military Flotilla.
May	Priyatelnaya	Galley		Tavrov	Russia	For Don Military Flotilla.
May	Razumnaia	Galley		Tavrov	Russia	For Don Military Flotilla.
May	Siiatelnaia	Galley		Tavrov	Russia	For Don Military Flotilla.
May	Sklonnaia	Galley		Tavrov	Russia	For Don Military Flotilla.
May	Terpelivaia	Galley		Tavrov	Russia	For Don Military Flotilla.
May	Uchtivaia	Galley		Tavrov	Russia	For Don Military Flotilla.
May	Vedraia	Galley		Tavrov	Russia	For Don Military Flotilla.
May	Zabavnaia	Galley		Tavrov	Russia	For Don Military Flotilla.
May	Zadornaia	Galley		Tavrov	Russia	For Don Military Flotilla.
1 June	Le Phenix	East Indiaman	Gilles Cambry	Lorient	Kingdom of France	For Compagnie des Indes.
July	Blaahejren	Corvette			Denmark–Norway	For Royal Danish Navy.
5 September	Prince of Orange	Third rate	Richard Stacey	Deptford Dockyard	Great Britain	For Royal Navy.
22 December	Borée	Third rate	François Coulomb	Toulon	Kingdom of France	For French Navy.
December	Scarborough	East Indiaman	Buxton	Rotherhithe	Great Britain	For British East India Company.
Unknown date	Asia	Fourth rate	Juan de Acosta	Havana	(Spain) Cuba	For Spanish Navy.
Unknown date	Naïade	Corvette		Le Havre	Kingdom of France	For French Navy.
Unknown date	Salamandre	Bomb vessel		Brest	Kingdom of France	For French Navy.
Unknown date	Middelburg	Fourth rate	Thomas Davis	Amsterdam	Dutch Republic	For Dutch Navy.
