= Battle of Kerch Strait =

Battle of Kerch Strait may refer to:

- Battle of Kerch Strait (1774)
- Battle of Kerch Strait (1790)
- 2018 Kerch Strait incident
