= Battle of Kerch =

Battle of Kerch can refer to:

- Battle of Kerch Strait (1774)
- Battle of Kerch Strait (1790)
- Battle of the Kerch Peninsula (1941-1942)
