= Vinius (surname) =

Vinius is a surname. Notable people with the surname include:

- Titus Vinius (12–69), Roman general
- Andrew Vinius (1641–1717), Russian statesman
