= List of ship launches in 1736 =

The list of ship launches in 1736 includes a chronological list of some ships launched in 1736.

Date	Ship	Class	Builder	Location	Country	Notes
21 January	America	Fourth rate	Juan de Acosta	Havana	(Spain) Cuba	For Spanish Navy.
31 March	Weymouth	Fourth rate	Peirson Lock	Weymouth	Great Britain	For Royal Navy.
14 June	Jersey	Fourth rate	Peirson Lock	Plymouth Dockyard	Great Britain	For Royal Navy.
20 June	Kennington	Sixth rate	Richard Stacey	Deptford Dockyard	Great Britain	For Royal Navy.
30 June	Eltham	Fifth rate	Richard Stacey	Deptford Dockyard	Great Britain	For Royal Navy.
1 July	Augusta	Fourth rate		Deptford Dockyard	Great Britain	For Royal Navy.
27 August	Superb	Fourth rate	John Hayward	Woolwich Dockyard	Great Britain	For Royal Navy.
13 September	Fyen	Fourth rate		Copenhagen	Denmark–Norway	For Dano-Norwegian Navy.
13 September	Laland	Brigantine		Copenhagen	Denmark–Norway	For private owner.
13 September	Langelandr	Brigantine		Copenhagen	Denmark–Norway	For private owner.
15 September	Patronne	Galley	Jean Reynoir	Marseille	Kingdom of France	For French Navy.
19 October	Dragon	Fourth rate	John Hayward	Woolwich Dockyard	Great Britain	For Royal Navy.
31 October	Astrakhan	Pyotr II-class ship of the line	G. A. Okunev	Saint Petersburg	Russia	For Imperial Russian Navy.
31 October	Azov	Pyotr II-class ship of the line	I. Ramburg	Saint Petersburg	Russia	For Imperial Russian Navy.
18 December	Schellag	East Indiaman	Hendrik Raas	Middelburg	Dutch Republic	For Dutch East India Company.
Unknown date	Amur	Galley		Tavrov	Russia	For Don Military Flotilla.
Unknown date	Apollo	Galley		Tavrov	Russia	For Don Military Flotilla.
Unknown date	Assendelft	Fourth rate	Charles Bentam	Amsterdam	Dutch Republic	For Dutch Navy.
Unknown date	Brak	Unrated full-rigged ship	Charles Bentam	Amsterdam	Dutch Republic	For Dutch Navy.
Unknown date	Diana	Galley		Tavrov	Russia	For Don Military Flotilla.
Unknown date	Drake	Grab		Bombay	India	For British East India Company.
Unknown date	Elena	Galley		Tavrov	Russia	For Don Military Flotilla.
Unknown date	Galera Balbi	Galley			Republic of Venice	For Venetian Navy.
Unknown date	Galera Donà	Galley			Republic of Venice	For Venetian Navy.
Unknown date	Galera Gritti	Galley			Republic of Venice	For Venetian Navy.
Unknown date	Galera Soranzo	Galley			Republic of Venice	For Venetian Navy.
Unknown date	Gektor	Galley		Tavrov	Russia	For Don Military Flotilla.
Unknown date	Haarlem	Third rate	Charles Bentam	Amsterdam	Dutch Republic	For Dutch Navy.
Unknown date	Kavaler Sviatoi Alexander	Galley		Tavrov	Russia	For Don Military Flotilla.
Unknown date	Kavaler Sviatoi Andrei	Galley		Tavrov	Russia	For Don Military Flotilla.
Unknown date	Korona	Galley		Tavrov	Russia	For Don Military Flotilla.
Unknown date	Louve	Catboat		Rochefort	Kingdom of France	For French Navy.
Unknown date	Ours	Catboat		Rochefort, Charente-Maritime	Kingdom of France	For French Navy.
Unknown date	Madonna dei Miracoli e San Francesco di Paola	Full-rigged ship			Republic of Venice	For private owner.
Unknown date	Minerva	Galley		Tavrov	Russia	For Don Military Flotilla.
Unknown date	Monplezir	Galley		Tavrov	Russia	For Don Military Flotilla.
Unknown date	Moris	Galley		Tavrov	Russia	For Don Military Flotilla.
Unknown date	Palyulos	Galley		Tavrov	Russia	For Don Military Flotilla.
Unknown date	Paris	Galley		Tavrov	Russia	For Don Military Flotilla.
Unknown date	Plato	Galley		Tavrov	Russia	For Don Military Flotilla.
Unknown date	Success	Schooner		Bombay	India	For British East India Company.
Unknown date	Sviataia Anna	Galley		Tavrov	Russia	For Don Military Flotilla.
Unknown date	Telemakus	Galley		Tavrov	Russia	For Don Military Flotilla.
Unknown date	Üç Kantarlı	Second rate		Constantinople	Ottoman Empire	For Ottoman Navy.
Unknown date	Uliss	Galley		Tavrov	Russia	For Don Military Flotilla.
Unknown date	Venus	Galley		Tavrov	Russia	For Don Military Flotilla.
Unknown date	Windhond	Sixth rate	Charles Bentam	Amsterdam	Dutch Republic	For Dutch Navy.
Unknown date	Yanos	Galley		Tavrov	Russia	For Don Military Flotilla.
Unknown date	Zolotoe Iabloko	Galley		Tavrov	Russia	For Don Military Flotilla.
