= Lindsey Hughes =

British historian (1949–2007)

Lindsey Audrey Jennifer Hughes (4 May 1949 – 26 April 2007) was a British historian who studied seventeenth- and eighteenth-century Russia, especially the reign of Peter the Great. She wrote biographies of Peter and his predecessor Sophia Alekseyevna, as well as a more general work, Russia in the Age of Peter the Great. She also wrote prolifically on art history.

== Biography ==
Lindsey Hughes was born 4 May 1949. She joined the School of Slavonic and East European Studies (which later joined University College London) in 1987, became a reader in 1992 and a professor of Russian history in 1997.

Hughes wrote two books on Peter the Great. The New York Times called Russia in the Age of Peter the Great (1998) "a scholar's compilation, so organized -- with its full index and bibliography, lengthy chronology of events and topical arrangement of chapters and sections -- as to facilitate ready reference, the whole attractively printed with an absolute minimum of gaffes, all as befits the leading British authority on the subject and her distinguished publisher."

In a review of her book Peter the Great: A Biography (2002), a review in Publishers Weekly said that the book "will likely become a standard for scholars and students who want a short but comprehensive account of Peter the Great." Writing for The Daily Telegraph, Orlando Figes says, "In her splendid new biography, Lindsey Hughes... brings us closer to the true face of the Tsar. In the preface she modestly describes the book as a small companion to her panoramic social history, Russia in the Age of Peter the Great (1998); and in places where evidence about his life is thin, there is unavoidably some cut-and-paste from it. Yet the effect is always to enrich and clarify her picture of this fascinating Tsar."

Hughes died of cancer, aged 57, on 26 April 2007.

== Works ==
- Russia and the West. The Life of a 17th-century Westernizer, Prince Vasily Vasil'evich Golitsyn (1643 – 1714) (Newtonville, Mass.: Oriental Research Partners 1984 (Russian Biographies Series vol 14))
- Sophia, Regent of Russia 1657 – 1704 (New Haven, Conn.: Yale University Press, 1990)
- Russia in the Age of Peter the Great (New Haven, Conn. Yale University Press, 1998)
- Peter the Great: A Biography (New Haven, Conn.: Yale University Press, 2002)
- The Romanovs : ruling Russia, 1613–1917 (London; New York: Hambledon Continuum, 2008)
