= Battle of Ösel Island =

1719 naval battle during the Great Northern War

Coordinates: 58.4167°N 22.5000°E

- Part of the Great Northern War
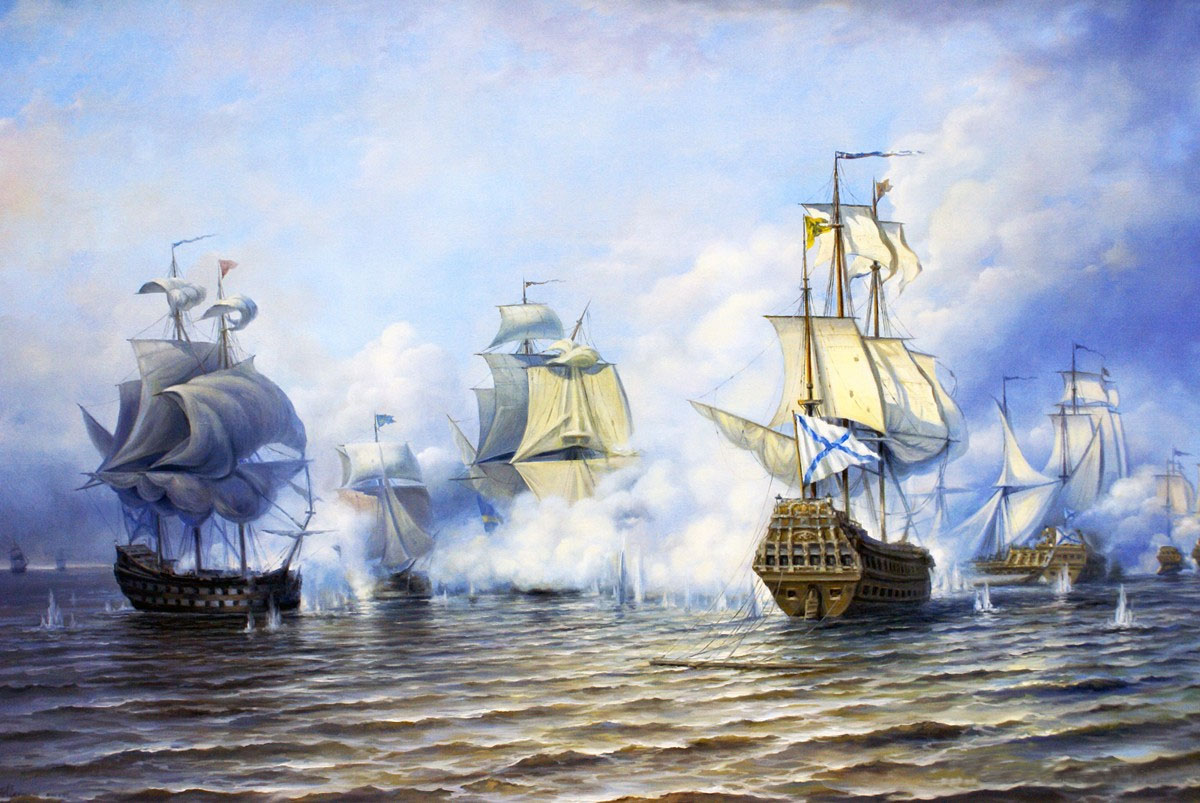
- Aleksey Bogolyubov. Battle of Oesel
Date	24 May 1719 (O.S.); 4 June 1719 (N.S.)
Location	near Saaremaa
Result	Russian victory

Belligerents
(yes) Swedish Empire	Tsardom of Russia

Commanders and leaders
Anton Johan Wrangel	Naum Senyavin

Strength
1 ship of the line 1 frigate 1 brigantine	6 ships of the line 1 smaller boat

Casualties and losses
3 ships captured 451 killed, wounded and captured	18

The Battle of Ösel (Note: also Osel and Oesel) Island took place on 4 June 1719 (N.S.), during the Great Northern War. It was fought near the island of Saaremaa (Ösel).

It led to a victory for the Russian captain Naum Senyavin, whose forces captured three enemy vessels, sustaining as few as eighteen casualties. It was the first Russian naval victory which did not involve ramming or boarding actions.

== Battle ==
Five months after Charles XII of Sweden died at Fredrikshald, a Russian squadron of seven warships assumed the offensive and Captains Naum Sinyaven and Konon Zotov attacked Commodore Anton Johan Wrangel near Ösel Island.

The Russian ships engaged in convoying galleys and transports, which waged the campaign along the Swedish skerries, landing troops on the islands and the sea coast. The raid by the Russian forces bore a clearly expressed punitive- demonstrative character.

The Swedish flotilla of three vessels was defeated. All three Swedish ships were captured at the cost of 18 Russian casualties. The Swedish flagship Wachtmeister (1681) and a frigate were captured in heavy fighting.

== Ships involved ==
=== Russian Empire ===
- Devonshire 52
- Portsmouth 52
- Raphail 52
- Uriil 52
- Varachail 52
- Hyagudiil 52
- Natalia 18

=== Swedish Empire ===
- Wachtmeister 52 - Captured
- Karlskrona Vapen 30 - Captured
- Bernhardus 10 - Captured
