= Andrew Vinius =

Russian statesman (1641–1717)

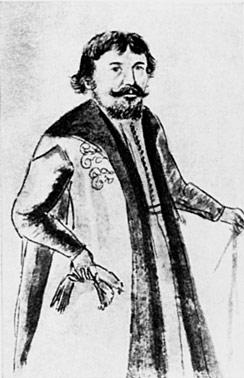
- Born: 1641
- Died: 1717 (aged 75–76)
- Occupation: Statesman
- Father: Andrey Denisovich Vinius

Andrew Vinius (Russian: Андрей Андреевич Виниус, romanized: Andrey Andreyevich Vinius; 1641–1717) was a Russian statesman of Dutch descent. He was a friend of Peter the Great and taught him European languages. He was a member of Peter's close-knit group of friends who organized themselves into the Jolly Company and The All-Joking, All-Drunken Synod of Fools and Jesters.

== Life ==
Vinius was the son of Dutch merchant Andrey Denisovich Vinius, who in 1627, associated with Isaac Massa and went to Russia as a grain trader. In 1628, he married Geertruid van Rijn. In 1632, during the time of Michael of Russia, he settled in Russia to found a water-powered ironworks in Tula, and in Serpukhov. Then he seems to have forced his wife to become either Greek Orthodox, or Russian Orthodox. Their son Andrew was raised to speak, besides Dutch, also Russian and German; he knew French, Polish and Latin too, which he later taught to Peter the Great. Around 1664, Vinius married an aristocratic Russian woman. He became the translator of his second cousin Nicolaas Witsen in 1665, visiting the country in the company of Jacob Boreel. Witsen became his life long friend with their common interest in cartography.

Vinius, who lived in the German Suburb with most of the other foreigners of Moscow, served in the Ministry of Foreign Affairs. Between 1672 and 1674 he travelled as a diplomat to London, Paris and Madrid. He then headed, together with his brother, to the Post Office, becoming the first Russian postmaster in 1675. So he was able to secretly send maps and all kinds of antique objects to Witsen.

Vinius taught the young Tsarevich Peter Dutch (and Latin?). He often corresponded with Peter, on matters ranging from war games and military strategy to their drunken parties as part of the Drunken Synod. Vinius was also the one who, after the Azov campaigns, arranged the parade into Moscow under a pagan arch that bewildered many Muscovites.

During the Great Northern War, after the Battle of Narva, Russian artillery was reduced to almost nothing. Peter appointed Vinius to the post of Inspector of Artillery and ordered him to produce more cannons. Upon the Tsar's order and against the wishes of many Russians, Vinius melted down many of the church bells of Russia, and even ordered beating-by-knout of the iron founders who were working too slowly. By melting a quarter of the church bells in Russia, eight months after the end of the Battle of Narva, Vinius managed to produce hundreds of cannons to send to the Russian army. Despite his old age, on Peter's command, he also went into Siberia to look for potential new mines, and ended up establishing several ironworks beyond the Ural Mountains. In 1700 and in 1706, he came to the Dutch Republic. Vinius had lost all of his land and goods, because of a conflict with Alexander Danilovich Menshikov. Vinius tried to connect the Greek- or Russian Orthodox and Dutch Reformed church. In 1709, Vinius was back in Moscow and received back his property. In 1712, his house burned down; his wife died in the fire.

== Bibliography ==
- Denzel, Markus A. (2004). Denzel, Markus A. (ed.). From commercial communication to commercial integration: Middle Ages to 19th century. Vol. 100. International Economic History Association, Universidad de San Andrés, Academia Nacional de la Historia (Argentina). Steiner. ISBN 978-3-515-08473-4.
- Jones, Maurice Bethell (2005). Peter Called the Great. Kessinger Publishing. ISBN 978-1-4179-9769-5.
- Massie, Robert K. (October 1981). Peter the Great: His Life and World. New York City: Ballantine Books. ISBN 0-345-29806-3.
- Olearius, Adam; Baron, Samuel H. (1967). Samuel H., Baron (ed.). The Travels of Olearius in Seventeenth-Century Russia. Stanford University Press. ISBN 978-0-8047-0219-5.
- Marion Peters, De wijze koopman. Het wereldwijde onderzoek van Nicolaes Witsen (1641-1717), burgemeester en VOC-bewindhebber van Amsterdam (Amsterdam 2010) [Transl.: "Mercator Sapiens. The Worldwide Investigations of Nicolaes Witsen, Amsterdam Mayor and Boardmember of the East India Company"]
- Seymour, Henry Danby (1855). Russia on the Black Sea and Sea of Azof: Being a Narrative of Travels in the Crimea and Bordering Provinces; with Notices of the Naval, Military, and Commercial Resources of Those Countries (3 ed.). London: John Murray.
- Solovʹev, Sergeĭ Mikhaĭlovich (1976). History of Russia. Vol. 28. Academic International Press. ISBN 978-0-87569-269-2.
