= The All-Joking, All-Drunken Synod of Fools and Jesters =

Club founded by Peter I of Russia

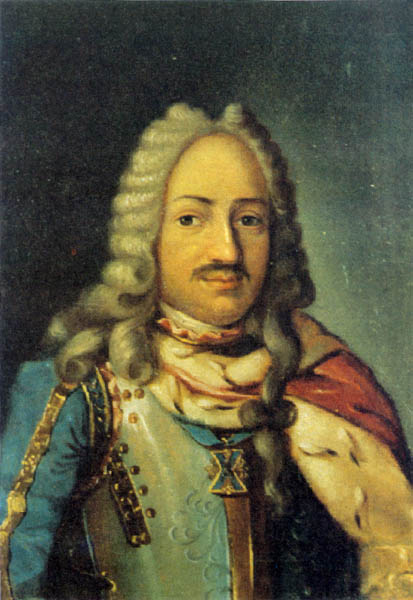
Franz Lefort, a member of the Synod

The All-Joking, All-Drunken Synod of Fools and Jesters (Note: The group is also known by various similarly-phrased titles.) (1692–1725) (Note: Robert K. Massie says, "The Drunken Synod, created when Peter was eighteen, continued its tipsy existence until the end of the Tsar's reign[.]" Massie 1981, p. 120. Peter died in 1725. Massie 1981, p. 845.) was a club founded by Peter I of Russia. The group included many of Peter's closest friends, and its activities centered mostly around drinking and reveling. The group was not without controversies; some of its parodies against the Russian Orthodox Church in particular were heavily criticized.

== The Jolly Company ==
As a teenager and young adult, Peter I of Russia had a large group of friends and followers. Some were childhood friends who had been with him since throughout his stay at Preobrazhenskoye or before, such as Nikita Zotov and Fyodor Romodanovsky; others were older patriotic men from respected families, such as Prince Michael Cherkassky, Prince Peter Prozorovsky, and Fedor Golovin; and some others were foreigners, such as Patrick Gordon and Franz Lefort, whose company Peter enjoyed. Together, the "cohesive group" often wandered the countryside and interrupted noblemen, asking for food and shelter for the night. Known as the "Jolly Company", it had anywhere from 80 to 200 members. In addition to the vast varieties of food, games, and events at the parties the Jolly Company held, there were also substantial amounts of alcoholic beverages.

In time, the Jolly Company held more and more parties within Moscow itself, often within the home of Franz Lefort. Lefort, however, had limited funds, and he could not often afford to host the Tsar. To assist Lefort, Peter first built Lefort a large dining hall, and when that grew to be too small, he built him a fully furnished stone mansion with a banquet hall that could hold 1,500 men. The hall would become "a kind of clubhouse" for the Jolly Company, even when Peter or Lefort were absent.

== Transformation into the "Synod" ==
The Jolly Company slowly "proceeded to more organized buffoonery and masquerades" as Peter gave many of the men titles that they addressed each other by, often for ridiculous reasons. For example, a boyar named Ivan Buturlin was forever known as "The Polish King" because he played the enemy in a mock battle at Preobrazhenskoye, while Fyodor Romodanovsky was first known as "King of Pressburg" and then as "Prince-Caesar". Many years later, Peter would address Romodanovsky as "Your Majesty" and even presented him as the Tsar to defeated military opponents.

The Jolly Company eventually formed a group known as The All-Joking, All-Drunken Synod of Fools and Jesters, which had a "Prince-Pope", a college of cardinals, bishops, archimandrites, priests and deacons. Deacon Peter created several rituals, ceremonies, and commandments for the group, which involved primarily heavy drinking requirements, and was the leader of the group, despite his lowly title. The group ended up including every man of power within the Tsar's government, and even real clergymen as well.

In January 1695, just three years after the election of Nikita Zotov as "Prince-Pope", Peter refused to partake in a traditional Russian Orthodox ceremony of having holy water sprinkled over his head during the Epiphany Ceremony. Instead, Peter and the Synod celebrated their own version of the Russian folk custom of sviatki, with partying, drinking, and even eroticism. Peter even specifically designed Zotov's election and the celebration to conflict with the traditional Church celebration.

== Mocking of the Russian Orthodox Church ==
Peter's creation of this group was not without controversy, both at the time and in the eyes of historians. Peter formed the Drunken Synod when he was just eighteen and let it continue until the end of his life. The mock-Synod angered many Orthodox Russians; many even believed because of it that Peter was the Antichrist. Robert K. Massie says that this quickly changed after "Peter quickly steered the parody to a safer mimicry of the Roman Catholic Church", which did not bother as many Russians. Robin Milner-Gulland notes that the Synod has been seen in various lights – as an imitation of Hellfire Clubs, a physical manifestation of Peter's drive at modernizing Russia or of Peter's partial seizures, or simply as a way for Peter and his friends to enjoy themselves.
