= Alexei Senyavin =

Admiral of the Imperial Russian Navy

Alexei Naumovich Senyavin
- Алексей Наумович Сенявин
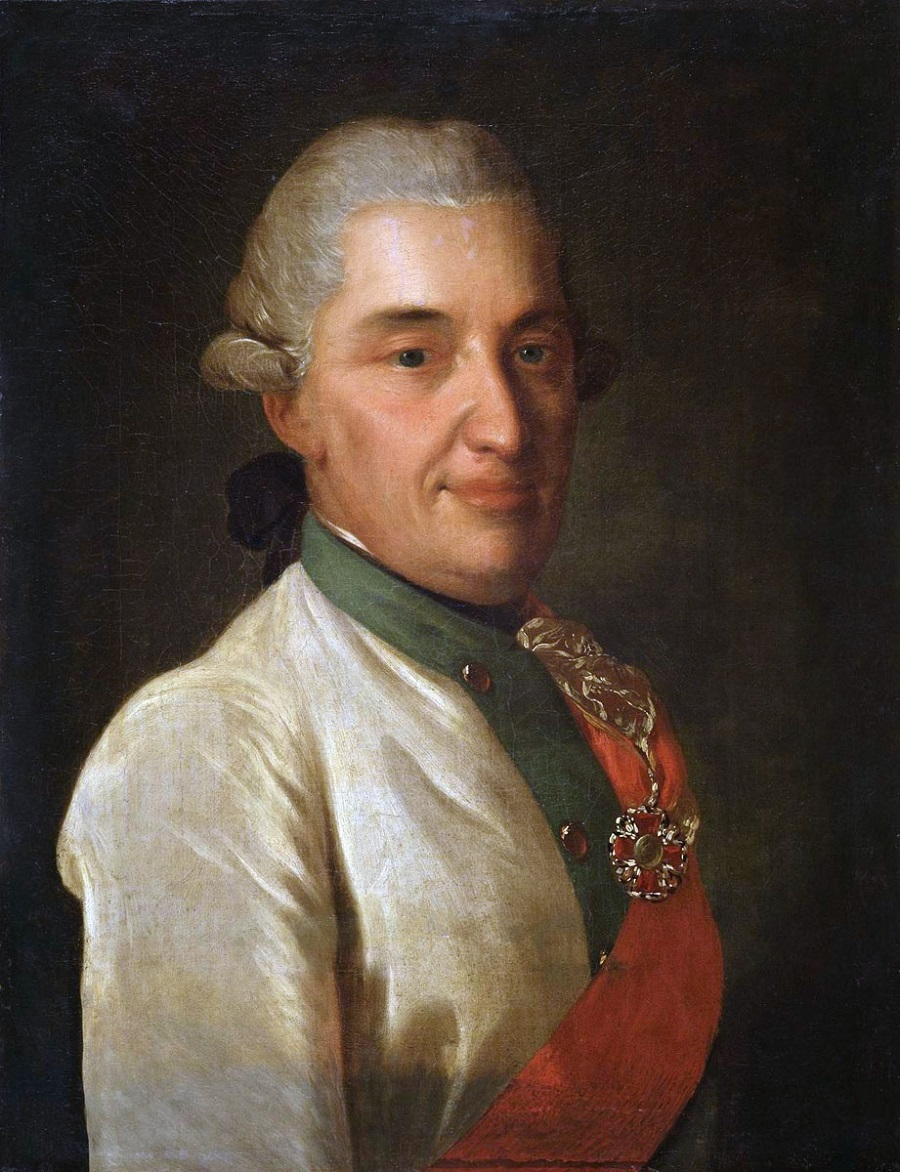
- Born: October 5, 1716
- Died: August 10, 1797 (aged 80); St. Petersburg, Saint Petersburg Governorate, Russian Empire
- Other name: Sinyavin
- Relatives: Naum Senyavin (father); Dmitry Senyavin
- Military career
- Allegiance: Russian Empire
- Branch: Imperial Russian Navy
- Service years: 1734 to 1788
- Rank: Admiral
- Commands: Don Military Flotilla, Azov Military Flotilla
- Conflicts: Russo-Turkish War (1735–1739); Russo-Swedish War; Seven Years' War; Siege of Kolberg; Russo-Turkish War (1768–1774); Battle of the Kerch Strait
- Awards: Order of St. Andrew, Order of St. Vladimir, Order of St. Alexander Nevsky, Order of St. Anna

Alexei Naumovich Senyavin (also spelled Sinyavin; Russian: Алексей Наумович Сенявин; 5 October 1716 – 10 August 1797) was an admiral of the Imperial Russian Navy, son of Naum Senyavin.

== Early career ==
Senyavin began his career in the navy in 1734 as a warrant officer. Serving in the Dnieper Flotilla, he took part in the Russo-Turkish War of 1735-1739. In 1739, Alexei Senyavin was transferred to the Baltic Fleet. At the height of the Seven Years' War, Senyavin commanded a battleship during the blockade of Kolberg (1760), where he distinguished himself. Alexei Senyavin retired from the navy in 1762 as a captain, 1st rank.

== Later career ==
Senyavin's later career in the navy coincided with the reign of Catherine the Great. In 1766, he was called out for service yet again and promoted to the rank of rear admiral two years later. Due to Russia's ongoing preparations for the war against the Turks, the empress entrusted Alexei Senyavin with the construction of different ships at the dockyards along the Don River, which would be able to reach the Sea of Azov and the Black Sea. Thus, Senyavin was made responsible for re-establishing the Don Military Flotilla, which was supposed to interoperate with the Russian ground forces along the Crimean coastline. Senyavin had to come up with a certain type of ships, which could navigate in shallow waters and meet combat requirements, at the same time. Alexei Senyavin managed to build a flotilla by 1771 and then sent it to Taganrog to assist the Russian troops in occupying the Crimea. In 1773, he was put in charge of this flotilla and succeeded in fighting off the Turks at sea, finally blocking their access to the Sea of Azov by capturing Yenikale and Kerch. In 1774, Senyavin rebuffed the attack of the Turkish fleet in the Strait of Kerch, making it retire with losses. Owing in large part to the actions of the Don Military Flotilla under Senyavin's command, Russia signed a favourable Treaty of Küçük Kaynarca with Turkey, regaining Azov and Taganrog and gaining Kerch and Yenikale. Thus, Catherine II made Peter the Great's dream a reality – Russia finally got its first direct access to the Black Sea.

== Honors ==
For his excellent service and achievements, Alexei Senyavin was first promoted to the rank of vice admiral (1769) and then admiral (1775). He was also awarded the Order of St. Anna and Order of St. Alexander Nevsky. In 1788, Alexei Senyavin retired from the navy due to his illness. Upon his recovery in 1794, he was asked to join the Admiralty Board.
