= Battle of Kerch Strait (1774) =

1774 naval battle of the Russo-Turkish War (1768–1774)

These battles took place during the Russo-Turkish War, 1768–1774, on 20 June and 9 July (Old Style) 1774 south of Kerch, Russian Empire.

On 20 June an Ottoman force of 5 ships of the line, 9 frigates and 26 galleys and xebecs surprised a Russian force, under Vice-Admiral Senyavin (great-uncle of Admiral Dmitry Senyavin), of 3 frigates, 4 16-gun vessels, 2 bombs and 3 small craft and tried to cut it off. The Russians anchored just outside the Kerch Strait and sailed toward Kerch the next day. Vasily Chichagov took part in this action.

On 9 July, the Ottomans, needing to destroy the Russian ships so their land army could cross the Kerch Strait, attacked, but abandoned the effort after it was found that the Russian bombs had a greater range. The Ottoman force that day consisted of 6 battleships, 7 frigates, 1 bomb and 17 galleys and xebecs.
