= Don Military Flotilla =

The Don Military Flotilla (Russian: Донская военная флотилия) was established in 1723 in Tavrov for countering Turkish vessels in the Sea of Azov. By 1735, the Russians had built 15 prams (flat-bottom artillery sailing ships), some 60 galleys and other ships. Under the command of Rear Admiral Pyotr Bredal, the Don Military Flotilla participated in the Russo-Turkish War of 1735-1739, capturing of Azov, supporting the Russian ground forces in the Crimea etc. In 1739, the Don Military Flotilla was disbanded.

At the beginning of the Russo-Turkish War of 1768-1774, the Don Military Flotilla was re-established and, under the command of Rear Admiral Alexei Senyavin, successfully interoperated with the ground forces in the Crimea, participated in the capturing of Kerch and Yenikale (1771), and rebuffed the attacks of the Turkish landing forces in the Crimea. In 1783, the Don Military Flotilla was disbanded due to the establishment of the Black Sea Fleet.

The Soviet Don Military Flotilla existed in March–August 1919, assisting the troops of the Southern Front in their struggle with the White Guards along the Don River. Pyotr Dello and then B.F.Korsak commanded the Soviet Don Military Flotilla.

In 1941, a Separate Don Squadron was detailed from the Don Military Flotilla, which would take part in the defense of the Don estuary from the German Army together with the 9th and 56th Armies.
