= Naum Senyavin =

First Russian Vice Admiral (1680-1738)

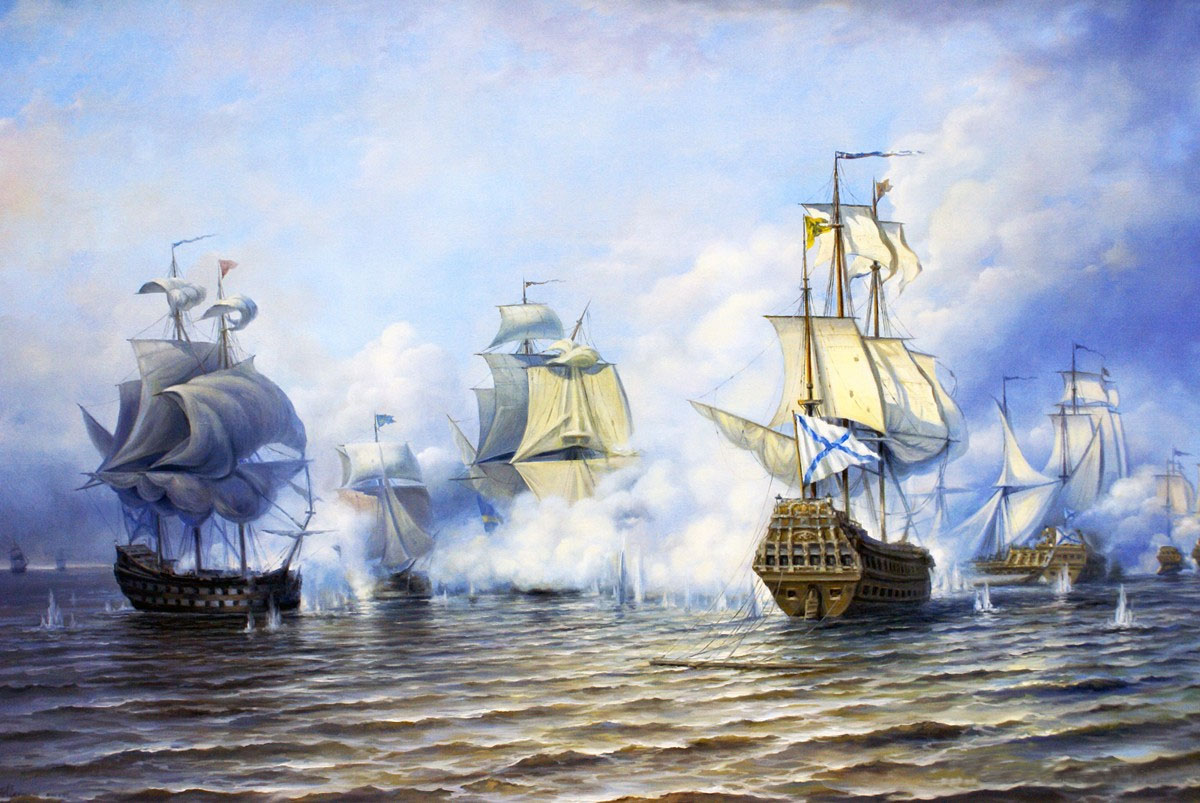
Battle of oesel.

Naum Akimovich Senyavin or Sinyavin (Russian: Наум Акимович Сенявин; c. 1680 – June 4 [O.S. May 24] 1738) was Vice Admiral (1727) of the Imperial Russian Navy. He was Russia's first Vice Admiral. He was the father of Alexey Naumovich Senyavin.

== Biography ==
In 1698, Naum Senyavin began his military career as a soldier of the Preobrazhensky regiment. He became a sailor under the Captain Peter Mikhailov and was then was promoted to the rank of non-commissioned officer. Naum Senyavin first distinguished himself during the Great Northern War.

In 1713, he was appointed commander of a battleship. In 1716, when António de Vieira was in the Danish capital, he witnessed the poor treatment given by Naum Senyavin to his sailors and informed the Russian court of what had happened.

In 1719, as a squadron commander, Senyavin fought Swedish forces during the Battle of Ösel and captured three ships. In 1721, he became a member of the Admiralty Board (Адмиралтейств-коллегия). In 1728–1732, Senyavin commanded a galley fleet. In September 1737, he was appointed commander of the Dnieper Flotilla during the Russo-Turkish War of 1735-1739. He build the shipyard below the Dniper rapids near Khortytsya island.

Peter the Great gave some lands close to Saint Petersburg to Senyavin, and the estate became known as the selo of Sinyavino. Currently it is an urban-type settlement in Kirovsky District of Leningrad Oblast, Russia.

In 1738, an epidemic of plague broke out and Senyavin died of this disease at the end of May 1738.
