= Siege of Coron (1770) =

Military conflict

- Part of the Orlov revolt and the Russo-Turkish War (1768–1774)
Date	February – June 1770
Location	Koroni, Messenia, Peloponnese, Ottoman Empire (now Greece)
Result	Ottoman victory

Belligerents
(Russia) Russian Empire; Greek rebels	Ottoman Empire

Commanders and leaders
Grigory Spiridov; Local Greek leaders	Unknown Ottoman commander

Strength
Several hundred Russian marines and sailors ~1,000–2,000 Greek irregulars	Several thousand Ottoman soldiers and Albanian mercenaries

Casualties and losses
Heavy; many killed or captured	Unknown

The Siege of Coron (Greek: Πολιορκία της Κορώνης) was a military engagement that took place between February and June 1770, during the Orlov Revolt. It was fought between the Russian Empire and local Greek rebels against the Ottoman Empire in the town of Coron, in the southwestern Peloponnese. The siege ended with an Ottoman victory, marking one of the key failures of the Orlov expedition in the Morea.

== Background ==
In early 1770, as part of Russia's effort to foment rebellion within the Ottoman Empire during the Russo-Turkish War, agents led by Count Alexey Orlov and Admiral Grigory Spiridov landed in the Peloponnese to encourage a Greek uprising. The local population, particularly in Mani and Messenia, responded enthusiastically, and several coastal fortresses, including Coron and Modon, became initial targets of the combined Russo-Greek forces. Coron was a strategically vital Ottoman port, controlling access to the southern Ionian Sea, and also served as a key supply point for Ottoman garrisons in the Morea.

== Siege ==
Following the arrival of Russian ships under Spiridov, a small contingent of Russian marines joined Greek irregulars to besiege the Ottoman garrison in Coron. The town was initially captured after a short assault, but the Russian and Greek forces lacked sufficient artillery and manpower to defend it effectively.

Ottoman reinforcements soon arrived from Tripolitsa and Modon, beginning a counter-siege in April 1770. After several months of bombardment and dwindling supplies, the defenders capitulated in June 1770. The surviving Greek and Russian troops either evacuated the town by sea or were captured. The Ottomans subsequently retook the town and re-established control over southern Messenia.

== Aftermath ==
The fall of Coron, together with the failure of the simultaneous Siege of Modon, signaled the collapse of the Orlov-backed rebellion in the Peloponnese. Although the Russian fleet later achieved a major victory at the Battle of Chesma, it could not reverse the situation on land. The revolt was eventually crushed, and the Peloponnese was subjected to widespread reprisals by Ottoman and Albanian troops.

Coron would remain under Ottoman control until the Greek War of Independence.

== See also ==
- Orlov Revolt
- Battle of Chesma
- Russo–Turkish War (1768–1774)
