= Battle of Bodrum =

Battle of Bodrum (1773)
- Part of the Russo-Turkish War (1768–1774)
Date	10–18 August 1773
Location	Bodrum, Kos, Ottoman Empire
Result	Ottoman victory

Belligerents
Ottoman Empire	Russian Empire

Commanders and leaders
(Ottoman Empire) Osman Pasha	Grigory Spiridov; Admiral Elmanov

Strength
5,000	4,000

Casualties and losses
Light	2,000

Battle of Bodrum (1773), was one of the battles of the Russo-Turkish War (1768–1774). The Russian fleet under the command of Admiral Elmanov landed in Bodrum on 10 August 1773 and in Kos on 17 August, where the Russian troops were repelled by the Turkish garrisons with heavy losses.

== Background ==
After the Chesma victory in 1770, the Russian navy continued its operations freely in the Aegean Sea without being threatened by the Ottoman navy, but the attacks they launched first on Lemnos (1770) and then on Lesbos (1771) were defeated by the Ottoman forces that Cezayirli Gazi Hasan Pasha was able to muster. The Russian navy, which was operating on the coasts of Syria and Egypt in 1772, focused on the Aegean Sea again under the command of Admiral Spiridov in 1773. Within this framework, Admiral Spiridov tasked Admiral Elmanov with 4 galleons and a considerable number of soldiers to destroy the Ottoman concentrations in Bodrum and Kos.

== Battle ==
On August 10, 1773, Admiral Elmanov bombarded Bodrum Castle at around 19:00 and landed 1,000 soldiers, then an additional 1,500 at around 04:00. However, the plundering operation was defeated by the attack of the Turkish troops, and the Russian troops suffered losses. He quickly boarded ships and left Bodrum.

Admiral Elmanov, who was defeated in Bodrum, attacked the island of Kos on August 17. After bombarding the island's castle, he landed nearly 1,500 soldiers. However, Admiral Elmanov, not counting the 5,000-man garrison on the island (including the militia), sent two more regiments and seven mortars to reinforce his weak forces, but was defeated by the Turkish attack on 18 August and withdrew from the island with heavy losses. The Russian army left behind thousands of dead, seven cannons, 10 tons of gunpowder and a large amount of siege equipment as it retreated.
