= Mandalzade Hüsameddin =

Ottoman statesman and navy officer

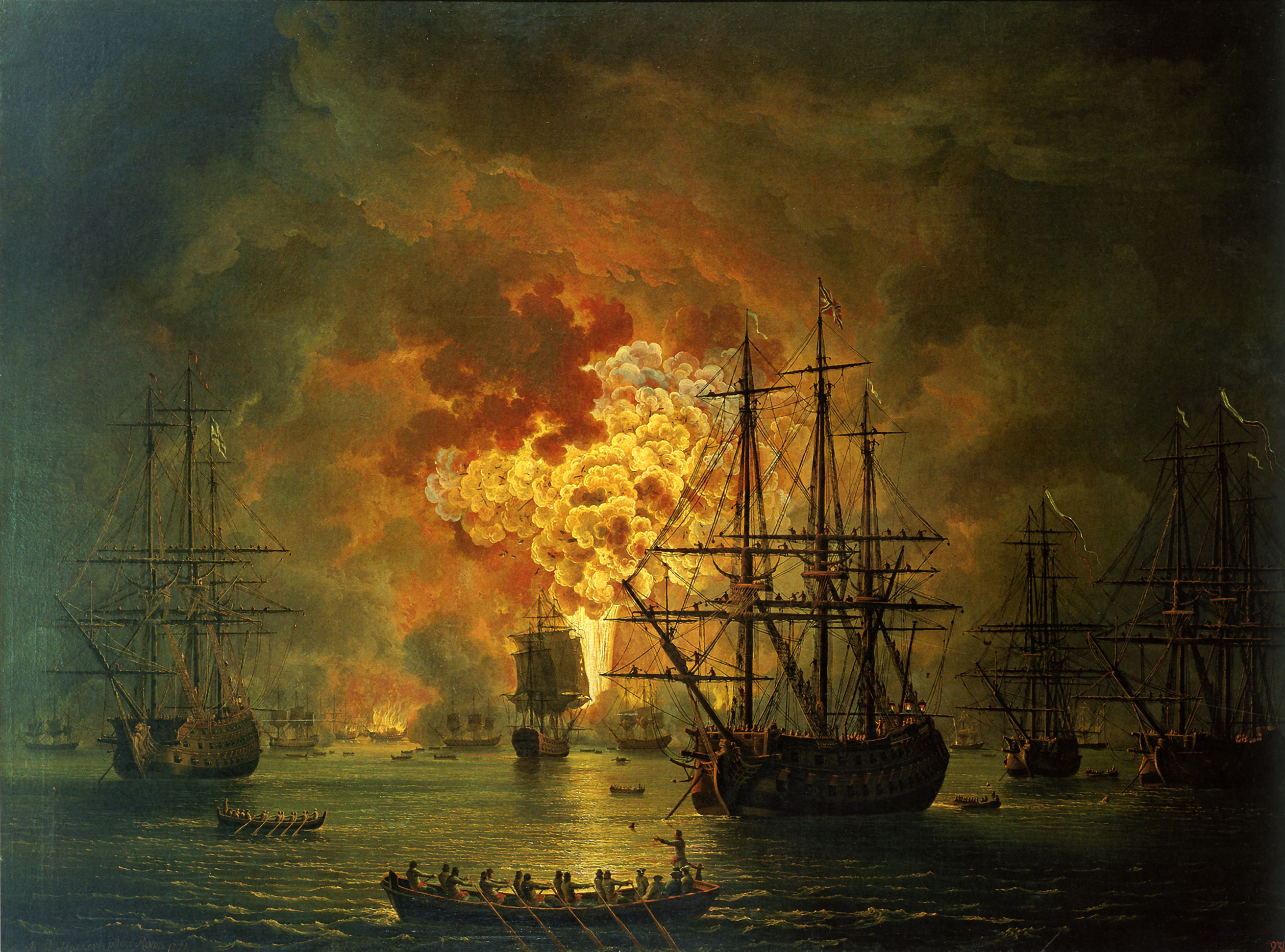
The defeat of the Ottoman fleet under the command of Mandalzade Hüsameddin Pasha against the Russian fleet in the Battle of Çeşme (1770)

Mandalzade Hüsameddin Pasha was an Ottoman statesman and admiral. In 1770 he was decorated as commander of the Ottoman Navy.

== Career ==
Mandalzade Hüsameddin, a skilled sailor from the Husamaddin shipyard, rose through the ranks to become a mirmiran after his appointment in 1769. During the Russo-Turkish War in 1770, Eğribozlu İbrahim Pasha was appointed as the High Admiral. The Ottoman navy, neglected prior to his tenure, had become significantly weakened.

Russian spies, collaborating with Orthodox citizens, were dispatched to Greece to instigate an uprising against the Ottoman Empire. In support of this uprising, the Imperial Russian Navy's Baltic Fleet, under Admiral Grigory Spiridov, sailed to the Mediterranean via Gibraltar. On July 5, 1770, an Ottoman fleet led by Husamaddin, encountered Spiridov's fleet in the Husamaddin Sheep Islands area. The clash resulted in damage and fires on both sides. Despite objections from fleet commanders, Pasha Husamaddin anchored his fleet between the port of Izmir and Cesme Adası. This decision by Pasha Husamaddin on the following day, known as the Battle of Chesma, led to a significant defeat for the Ottoman navy.

On July 6, a fire boat from the Russian fleet entered the port of Cesme, capitalizing on the vulnerability of the Ottoman navy. Pasha Husamaddin, displaying courage, took his fleet out to the open sea to engage in battle. The Ottoman ships, anchored closely without an escape route, caught fire and were completely destroyed. Algerian Hassan Pasha, though injured, survived the ordeal. Following the war, Husamaddin Pasha was dismissed, and on October 22, 1770, Algerian Hassan Pasha was appointed as captain-Deryalığa.
