= Orloff chicken =

Breed of chicken

Orloff
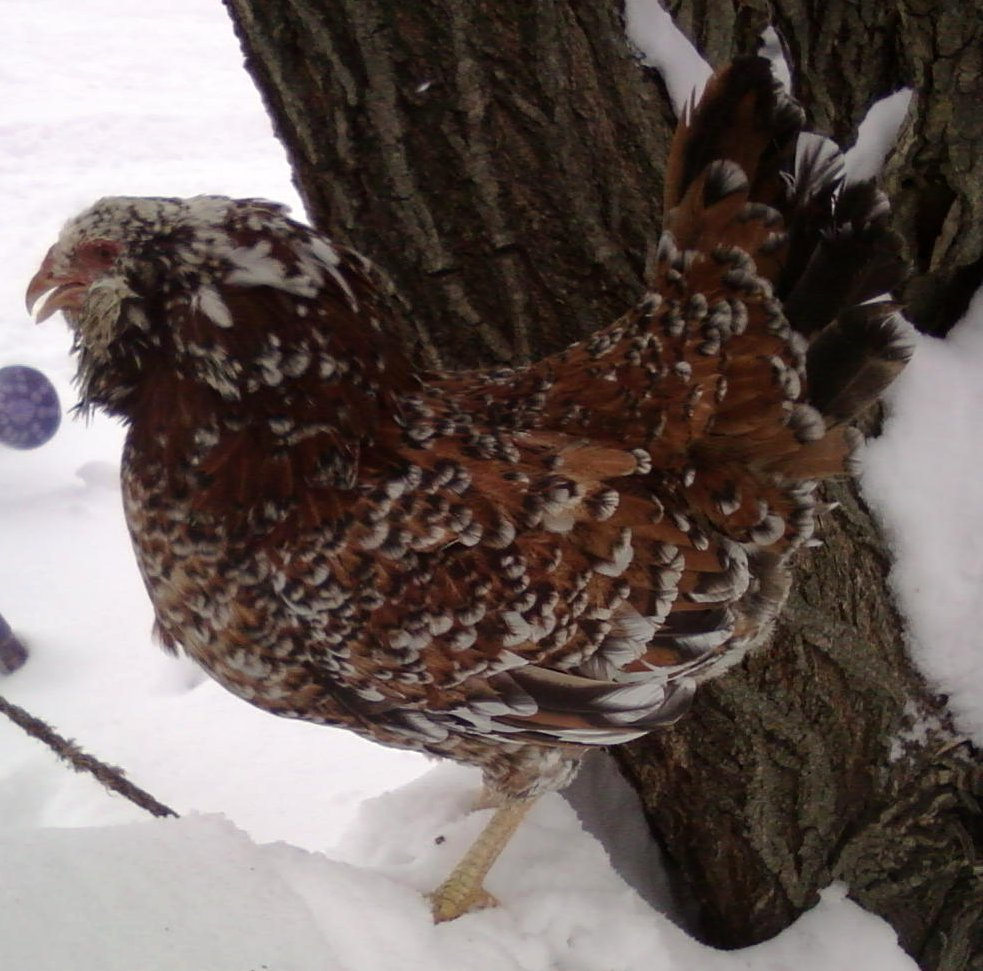
- Spangled Russian Orloff
- Conservation status: critical
- Other names: Russian Orloff; Russian
- Country of origin: Persia; Russia

Traits
- Weight: Male: 3.6 kg (7.9 lb); Female: 3 kg (6.6 lb)
- Skin color: yellow
- Egg color: light brown
- Comb type: walnut

Classification
- PCGB: rare soft feather: heavy
- Chicken; Gallus gallus domesticus

The Orloff is a breed of chicken named after Alexei Grigoryevich Orlov, a Russian Count. Reflecting this origin, it is sometimes called the Russian Orloff or simply Russian.

== Origin ==
For most of its history, the Orloff was considered to be a product of Russia and Orlov, but modern research has discovered that the breed first appeared in Persia, and was distributed across Europe and Asia by the 17th century. However, Count Orlov was a key promoter of the breed in the 19th century, and the breed became known in the West following his efforts.

== History ==
It was not until 1884 that the first Orloff chickens were imported to Central Europe from the Russian Empire. In some sources they are also called "Orloff fighters" (lat. Gallus dom. pugnax, barbatus). A reddish-brown cock and five hens of the same color reached the Saxon professor Friedrich Zürn (1835-1900) in Leipzig. A yellowish, slightly white speckled cock with two hens as well as two white hens came again into the possession of Baron Ludwig von Villa-Secca Navarro d'Andrade (1822-1894) to Vienna-Ottakring. Baron Villa-Secca was at that time vice-president of the Club of German and Austrian-Hungarian Poultry Breeders (today's Bund Deutscher Rassegeflügelzüchter; BDRG).

Orloffs were first introduced to Great Britain in the 1920s, and were also refined a good deal in Germany; Germans created the first miniaturized bantam Orloff by 1925. The breed was once included in the American Poultry Association's breed standard, the Standard of Perfection, but it was removed due a lack of interest from breeders. In the 21st century, the Orloff remains a rare breed in the West. The Livestock Conservancy lists the breed as critically endangered. In Russia, Irina G. Moiseyeva and other researchers have been devoting significant efforts to the genetic study and preservation of the Orloff breed in recent decades.

== Description ==
The Orloff is a tall, well-feathered chicken with a somewhat game-like appearance. The head and neck are very thickly feathered. They appear in several recognized color varieties: Black, White, Spangled, Black-tailed Red, Mahogany, and Cuckoo. Their plumage, combined with their tiny walnut comb, small earlobes and minuscule wattles, makes the Orloff a very cold-hardy breed. Males generally weigh 3.6 kilograms (7.9 lb) and hens about 3 kg (6.6 lb). Orloffs are primarily suited to meat production, but hens are reasonable layers of light brown eggs and do not usually go broody. In general temperament, they are known to be relatively calm birds.

== See also ==
- Orlov Trotter, a horse breed named after the same Russian family
