= Battle of Chesma =

1770 battle of the Russo-Turkish war

- Part of the Russo-Turkish War of 1768–1774
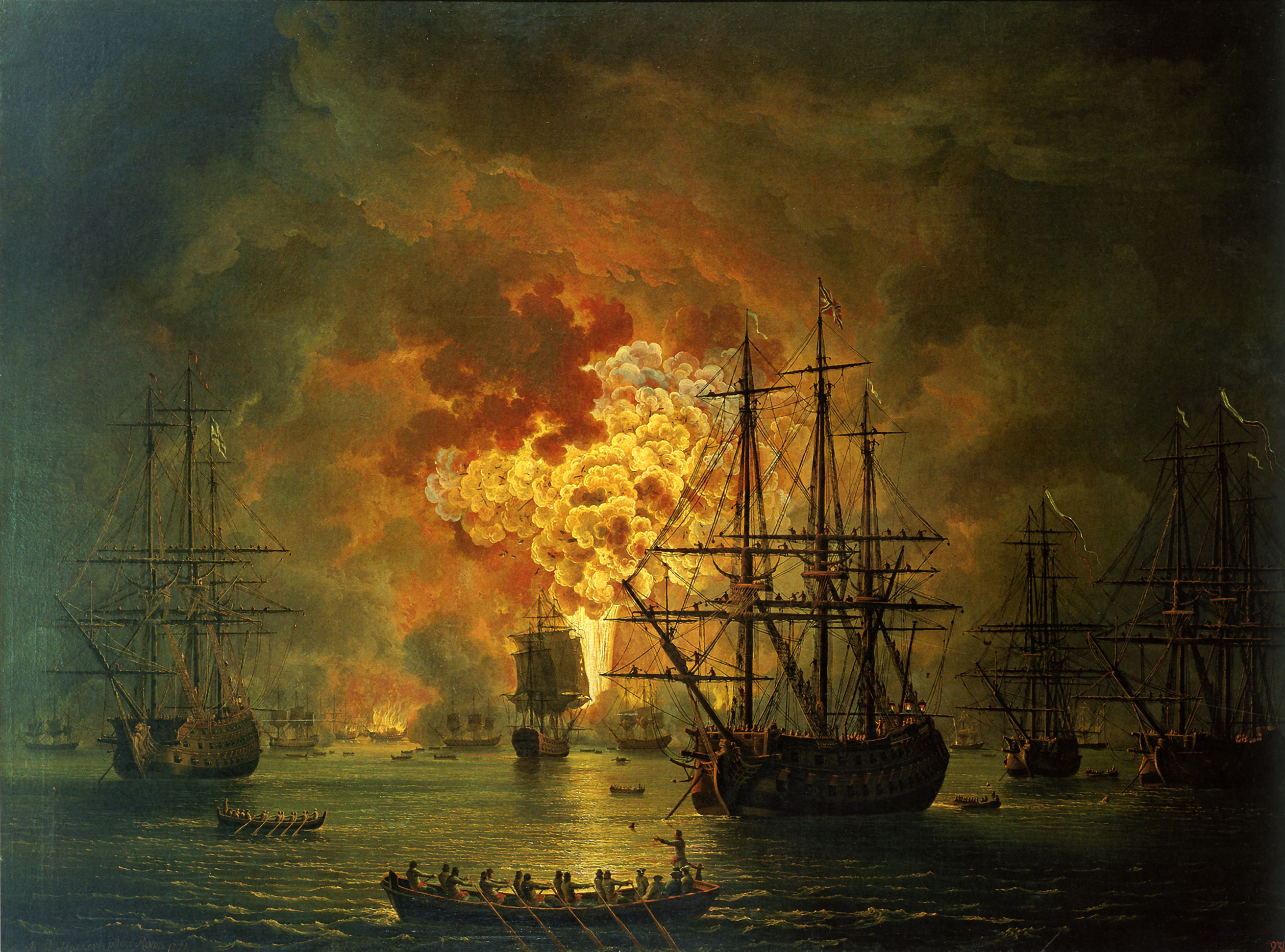
- The destruction of the Turkish fleet at the Battle of Chesme; Jacob Philipp Hackert, 1771
Date	5–7 July 1770 (Note: O.S. 24–26 June)
Location	Off Çeşme, Aegean Sea 38°19′48″N 26°17′24″E
Result	Russian victory

Belligerents
Russian Empire	Ottoman Empire

Commanders and leaders
Alexey Orlov (Note: He became commander-in-chief after Elphinstone's quarrel with Spiridov and ensured coordination between all commanders.); Grigory Spiridov; Samuel Greig (Note: He was, among other things, Alexey Orlov's adviser on naval operations, in which Orlov had little knowledge.); John Elphinstone	(Ottoman Empire) Hüsameddin Pasha; (Ottoman Empire) Gazi Hasan Pasha; (Ottoman Empire) Cafer Bey

Strength
9 ships of the line, 3 frigates, 1 bomb vessels, 4 fireships, 4 supply ships	16 ships of the line, 6 frigates, 6 xebecs, 13 galleys, 32 small craft, 1,300 guns

Casualties and losses
1 ship of the line 4 fire ships 534–661 killed 40 wounded	16 ships of the line 6 frigates and escort vessels 13 galleys 32 smaller vessels at least 11,000 men killed
- Location of the battle site in the Aegean Sea

The Battle of Chesma (also known as the Battle of Chesme, Battle of Cheshme or Battle of Cesme Bay) took place on 5–7 July 1770 in and near Çeşme, in the area between the western tip of Anatolia and the island of Chios, which was the site of a number of past naval battles between the Ottoman Empire and the Republic of Venice. It was a part of the Orlov revolt of 1770, a precursor to the later Greek War of Independence (1821–1829), and the first of a number of disastrous fleet battles for the Ottomans against Russia. Today it is commemorated as a Day of Military Honour in Russia.

== Prelude ==
A war between Russians and Ottomans had broken out in 1768, and Russia sent several squadrons from the Baltic Sea to the Mediterranean Sea to draw Ottoman attention away from their Black Sea fleet, then only six ships of the line strong. Two Russian squadrons, commanded by Admiral Grigory Spiridov and Rear Admiral John Elphinstone, a British captain who had risen to the rank of rear admiral in Russia, (Note: In 1768 he entered the Russian service and was sent with a small squadron from Kronstadt to help Admiral Spiridov.) combined under the overall command of General-in-Chief Count Alexei Orlov, supreme commander of the Russian Fleet, and went to look for the Ottoman fleet. Orlov's naval adviser was Captain-Commander Greig.

On 5 July 1770, they came across it, anchored in line just north of Çeşme Bay, western Anatolia. The Russian fleet was said to include 4 battleships, 2 frigates, 1 bomb vessel and 4 fire-ships. The Ottoman fleet contained about 14 ships of the line, perhaps 6 frigates, 6 xebecs, 13 galleys and 32 small craft, with about 1,300 guns in total. About 10 of the ships of the line, of 70–100 guns, were in the Ottoman main line with a further 6 or so in the second, arranged so that they could fire through the gaps in the first line. Behind that were the frigates, xebecs, etc. The fleet was commanded by Kapudan Pasha Mandalzade Hüsameddin, in the fourth ship from the front (north end) of the line, with Hasan Pasha in the first ship, Real Mustafa, and Cafer Bey in the seventh. Two further ships of the line, probably small, had left this fleet for Mytilene the previous evening.

After settling on a plan of attack, the Russian battle line (see Table 1) sailed towards the south end of the Ottoman line and then turned north, coming alongside the Ottomans, with the tail end coming into action last (Elphinstone had wanted to approach the northern end first, then follow the wind along the Ottoman line, attacking their ships one by one, which was the method used by Nelson at the Battle of the Nile in 1798).

== Battle ==
The Ottomans opened fire at about 11:45 a.m., followed by the Russians slightly later. Three of the Russian ships of the line had trouble staying in position; Evropa turned around and came back behind Rostislav, Tri Svyatitelya circled the second Ottoman vessel before coming back into the Russian line, being attacked in error by Tri Ierarcha as she did so, and Sviatoi Ianuarii turned around before coming back into the line.

Based on the plan proposed by G. A. Spiridov, the Russian fleet attacked the Ottoman van from a short distance (50–70 metres). Spiridov, in Sviatoi Evstafii, had a close-range battle with Hasan Pasha in Real Mustafa, before the latter was suddenly seen to be on fire. Her mainmast came down and landed on Sviatoi Evstafii's deck, causing the Russian ship to blow up immediately. Real Mustafa blew up as well after a 2-hour battle.

According to Elphinstone, who claimed the Russians were almost useless, Spiridov and Count Feodor Orlov (brother of the commander), had left Sviatoi Evstafii before the fighting became close-range. Spiridov ended up on Tri Svyatitelya. Sviatoi Evstafii's captain, Kruse, survived too. At about 2:00 p.m. the fighting ended, as the Ottomans cut their cables and moved south into the bay, forming themselves into a defensive line of eight ships of the line, a second line, and the rest beyond.

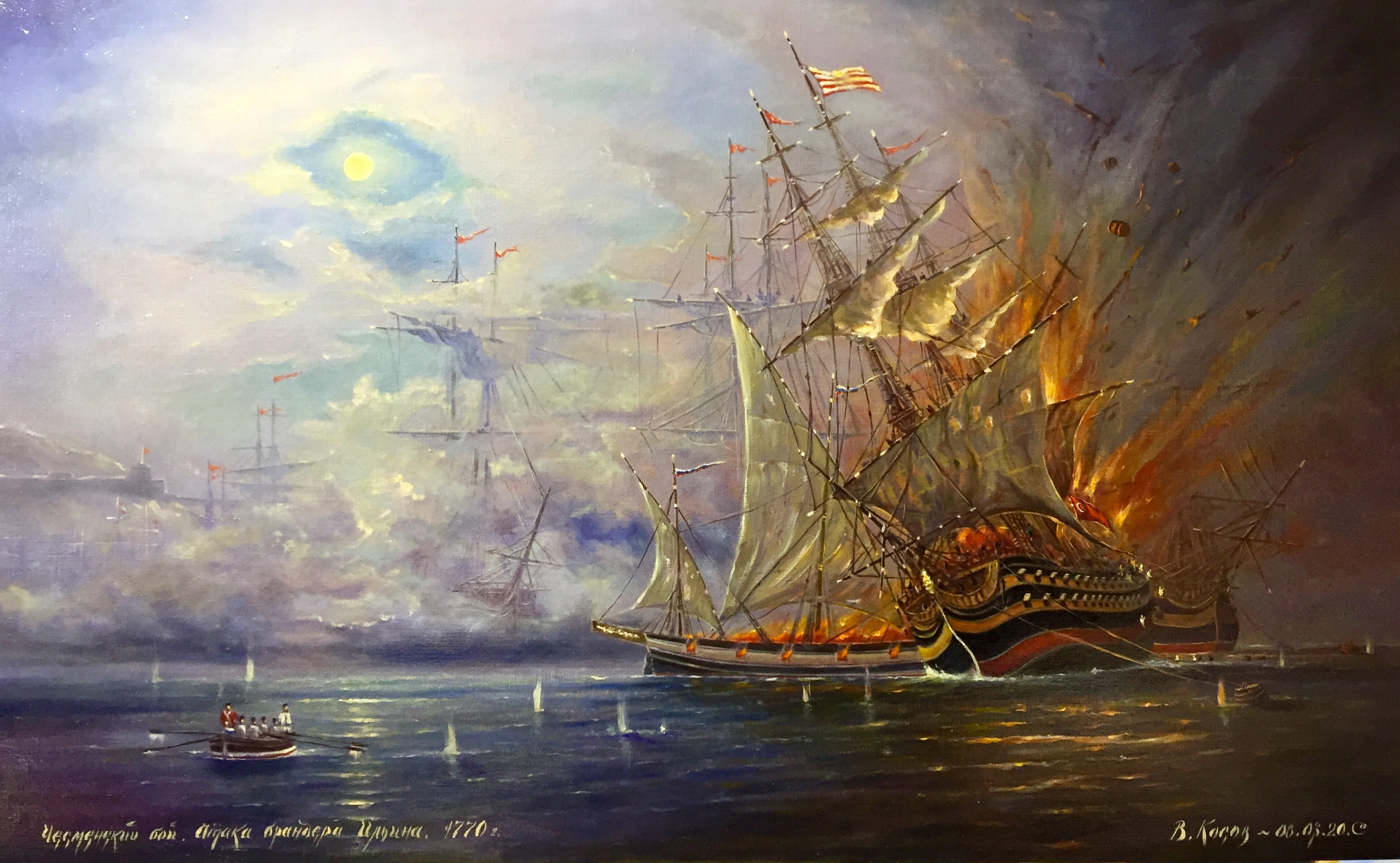
Vladimir Kosov. Chesma battle of 1770

On 6 July, the Russians bombarded the Ottoman ships and land positions. At about 12:30 a.m. on the morning of 7 July, Orlov, acting on Spiridov's plan, sent Samuel Greig (who transferred to Rostislav) to attack with Evropa, Rostislav and Ne Tron Menya forming a south–north line facing the Ottomans, and with Saratov in reserve, Nadezhda attacking the batteries at the eastern side of the bay entrance, Afrika attacking the batteries on the western side, and Grom near Afrika. At about 1:30 a.m. or earlier (times were about 90 minutes earlier, according to Elphinstone), fire from Grom and/or Ne tron menya caused an Ottoman ship of the line to blow up after her main topsail caught fire, and the fire quickly spread to other ships of the line. By 2:00 a.m., two Ottoman ships of the line had blown up and more were on fire, and Greig sent in three fireships (the fourth, seeing the danger, stayed out), which contributed in a small way to the burning of almost the entire Ottoman fleet: fireship commanded by Lieutenant D. S. Ilyin set fire to another ship of the line and consequently the fire continued to spread among various vessels. At about 4:00 a.m., boats were sent in to save two ships of the line which were not burning, but one of these caught fire while it was being towed. The other, Semend-i Bahri 60, survived and was captured along with five galleys. Fighting ended at about 8:00 a.m. Russian casualties on 5 July were 14 killed, plus 636 killed in Sviatoi Evstafii, and about 30 wounded, and on 7 July 11 killed. Ottoman casualties were much higher. Hüsameddin, Hasan Pasha and Cafer Bey survived. Hüsameddin was removed from his position, which was given to Cafer Bey. This was the only significant fleet action during the entire conflict.

Battle line	Guns	Type
Evropa ^{(a)}	66	Battleship (ship of the line)
Sviatoi Evstafii ^{(b)}	68	Battleship; blew up
Tri Svyatitelya	66	Battleship
Sviatoi Ianuarii	66	Battleship
Tri Ierarcha ^{(c)}	66	Battleship
Rostislav	68	Battleship
Ne Tron Menya	66	Battleship
Svyatoslav ^{(d)}	84	Battleship
Saratov	66	Battleship
Other ships	Guns	Type
Grom	12	Bomb ship
Sv. Nikolai	26/38?	Frigate
Afrika	32	Frigate
Nadezhda	32	Frigate
Sv. Pavel ^{(e)}	8	Pink (store ship)
Potchtalyon ^{(e)}	14	Despatch vessel
Graf Tchernyshev ^{(f)}	22	Armed merchantman
Graf Panin ^{(f)}	18	Armed merchantman
Graf Orlov ^{(f)}	18	Armed merchantman
? (captain Dugdale)		Fireship; sunk
? (captain Mackenzie)		Fireship; expended
? (captain Ilyin)		Fireship; expended
? (captain Gagarin)		Fireship
Table 1: Russian ships. Battleships (ships of the line) are listed in the order they came into action. Orlov's squadron in pink, Spiridov's in blue and Elphinstone's in yellow. Notes: (a) captain Klokatchev; (b) Spiridov's flagship, captain Kruse; (c) Orlov's flagship, captain Greig; (d) Elphinstone's flagship; (e) One or both of these were present; (f) Hired British ships that were supporting the fleet

== Significance ==
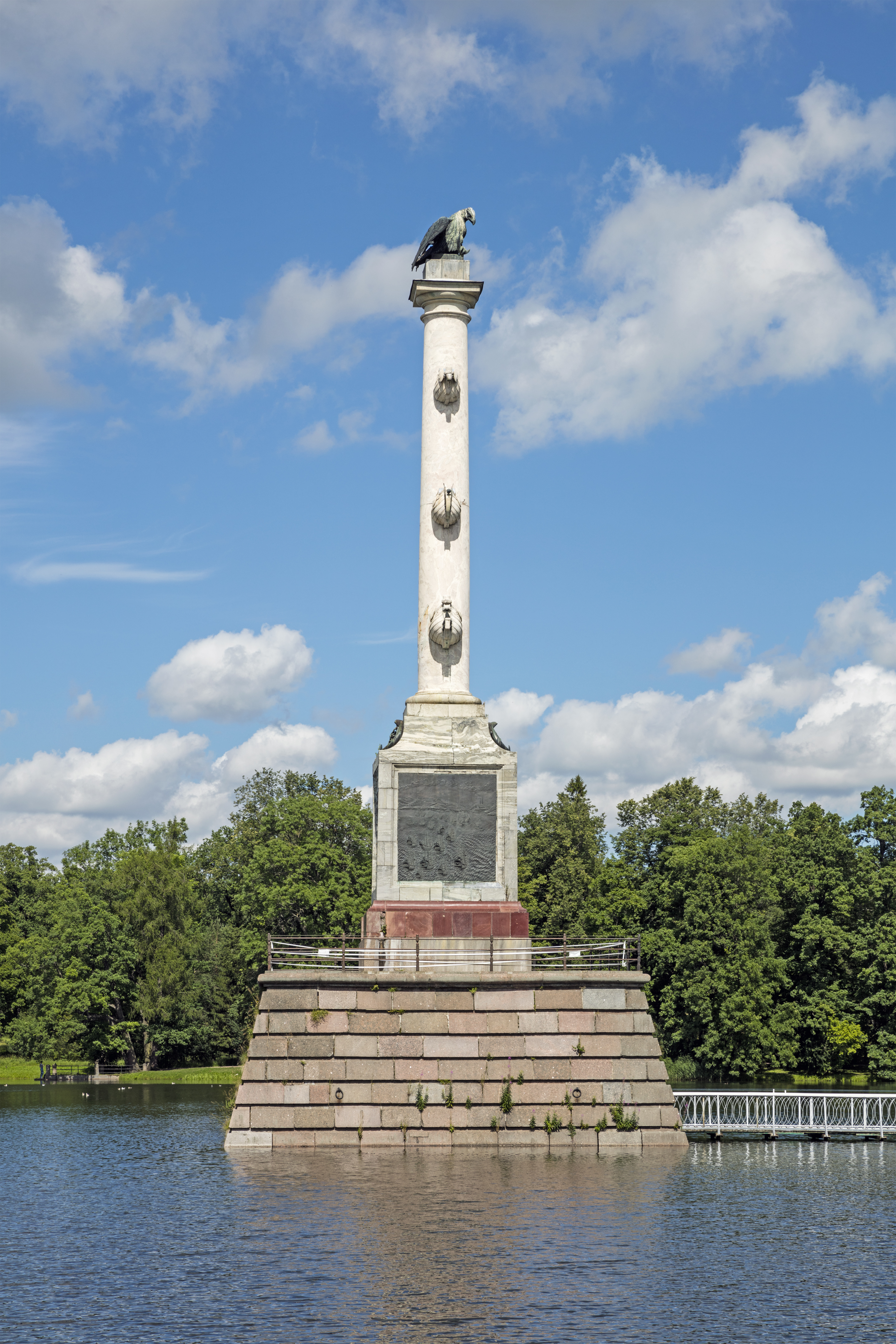
Chesma Column

The Battle of Cheshme was fought on the same day as the land Battle of Larga. It was the greatest naval defeat suffered by Ottomans since the Battle of Lepanto (1571). This battle inspired great confidence in the Russian fleet and allowed the Russians to control the Aegean Sea for some time. The defeat of the Ottoman fleet also sped up rebellions by minority groups in the Ottoman Empire, especially the Orthodox Christian nations in the Balkan peninsula, who helped the Russian army in defeating the Ottoman Empire.

After this naval victory, the Russian fleet stayed in the Aegean for the following five years. It returned to Çeşme twice more during this time to bombard it. Historians still debate the rationale for the Russian military focus on this small fort town while there were many other more strategic targets along the Aegean coast.

Due to the Ottoman defeat, fanatical Muslim groups proceeded to massacre c. 1,500 local Greeks in nearby Smyrna.

Catherine the Great commissioned four monuments to commemorate the victory: Chesma Palace and Church of Saint John at Chesme Palace in St Petersburg (1774–1777), Chesma Obelisk in Gatchina (1775), and Chesma Column in Tsarskoe Selo (1778).

=== Other depictions ===
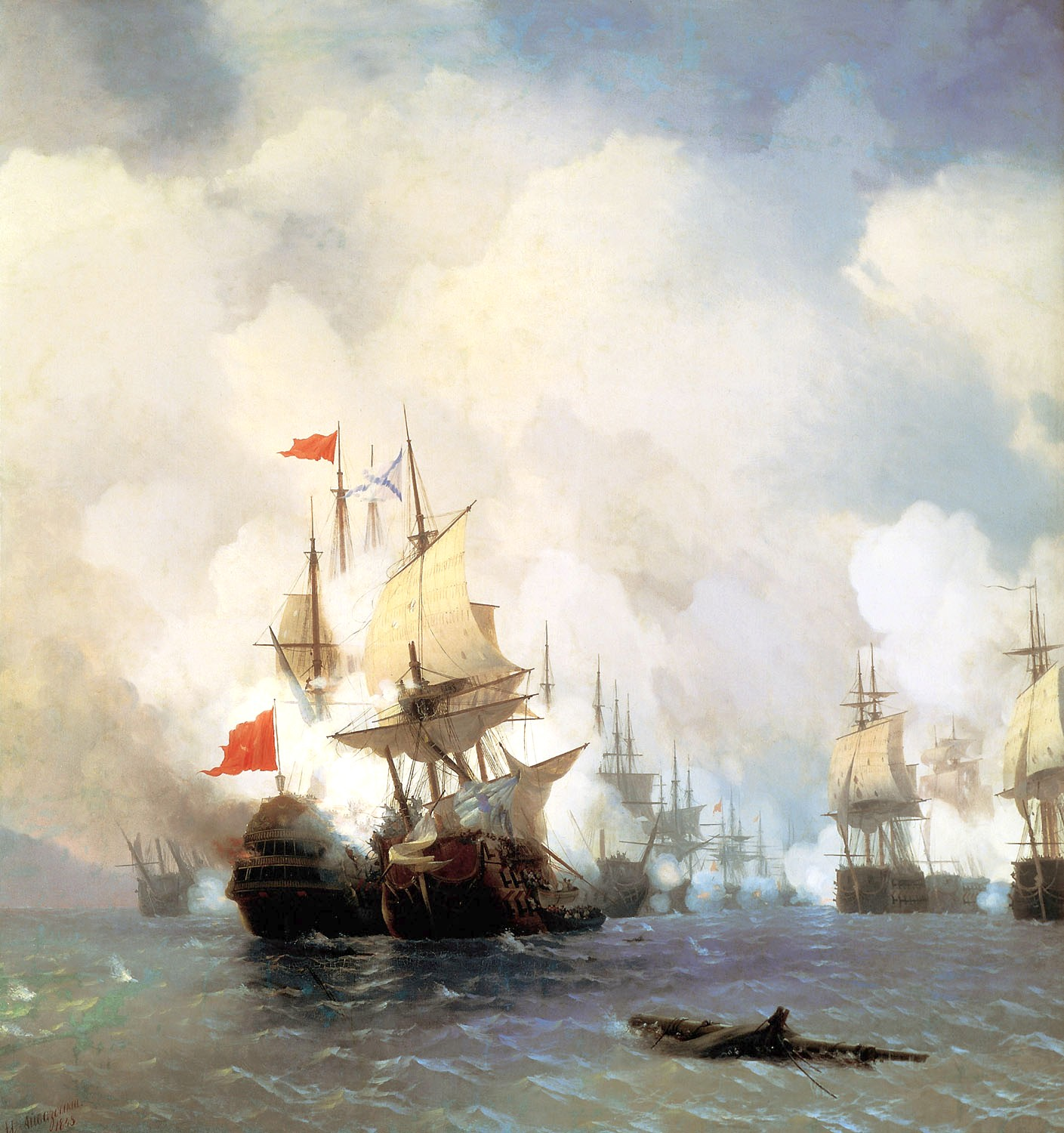
Combat in the Chios Strait by Ivan Aivazovsky

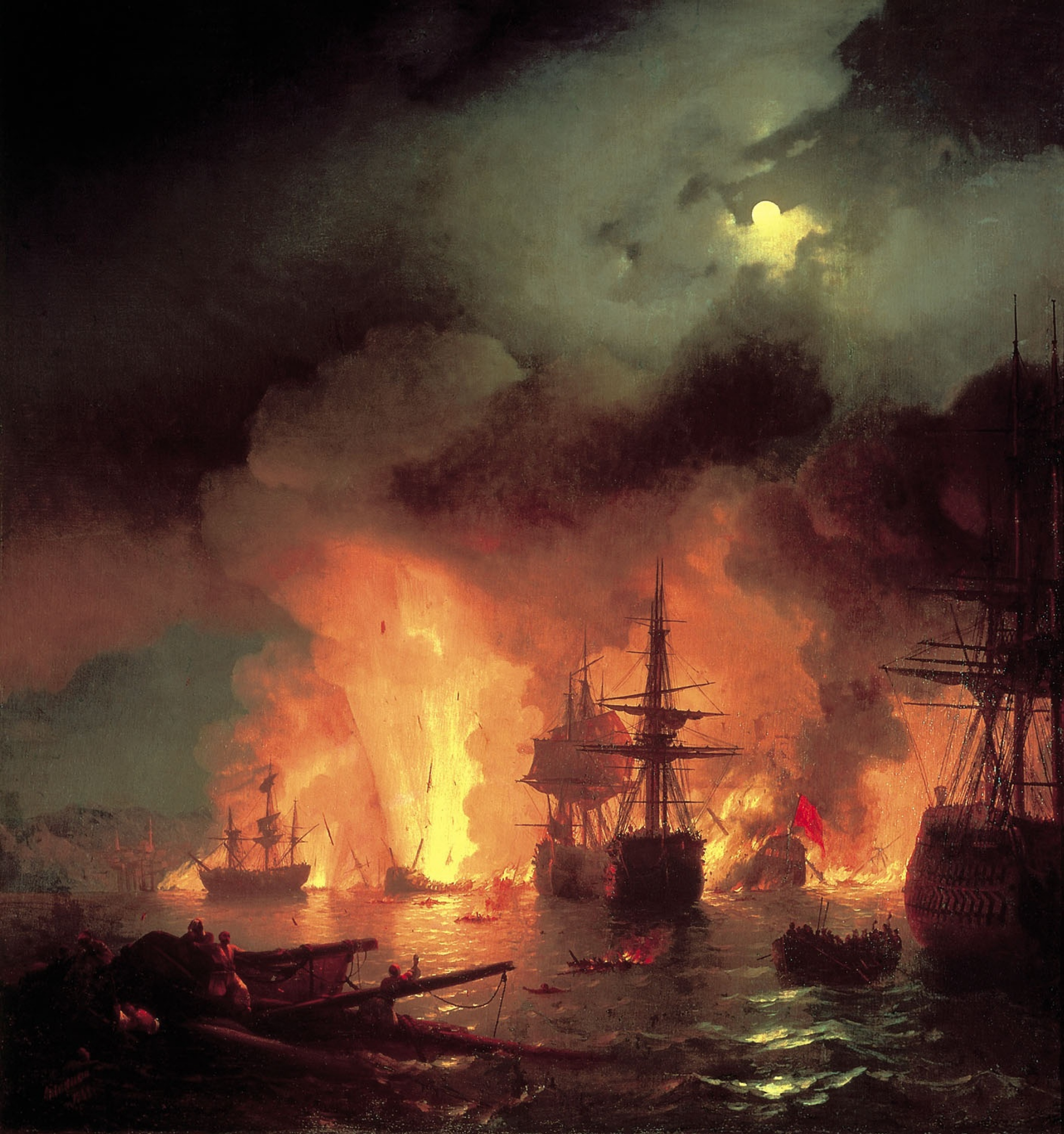
Battle of Chesma at Night by Ivan Aivazovsky

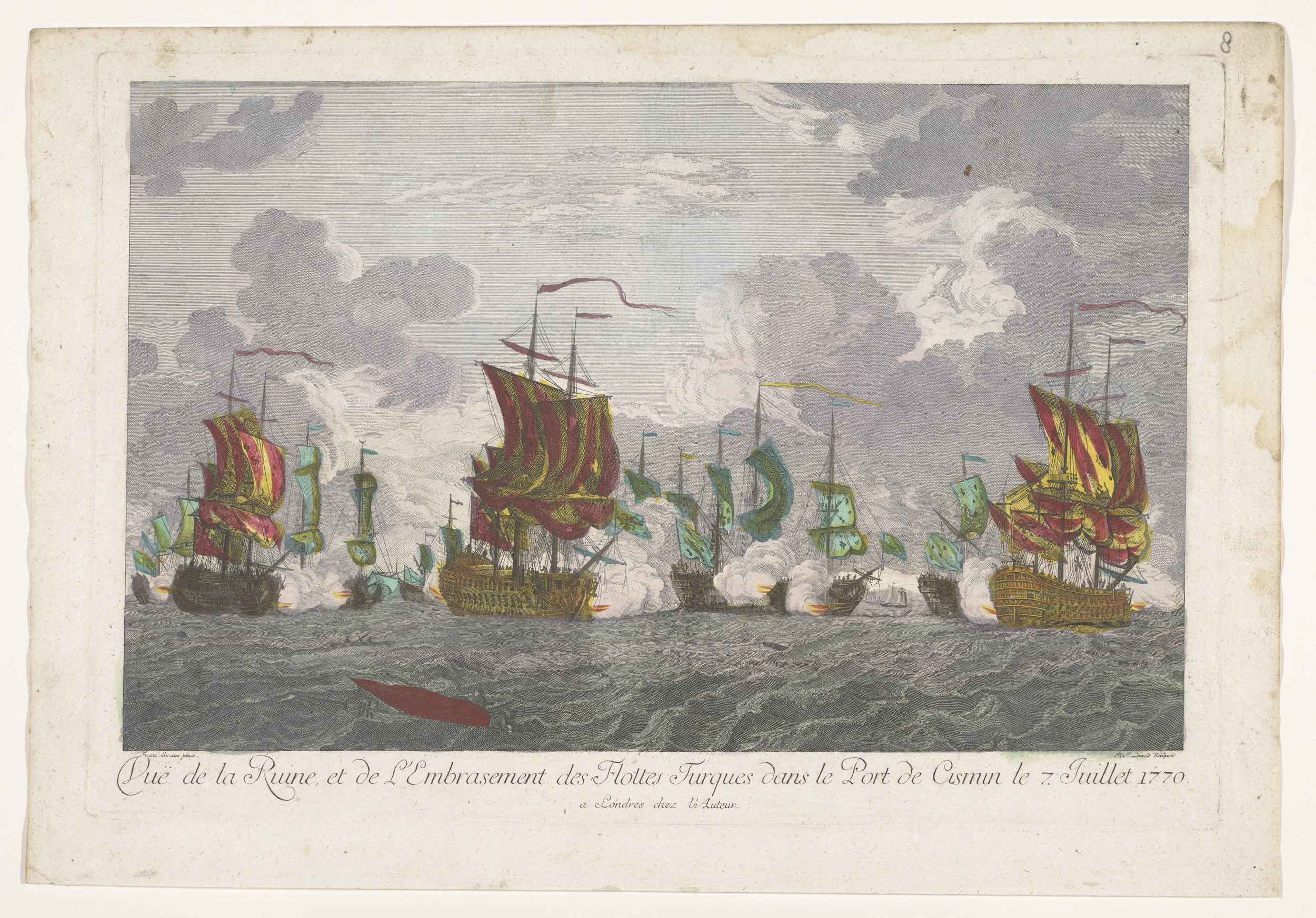
Dutch watercolor of the second half of the XVIII century

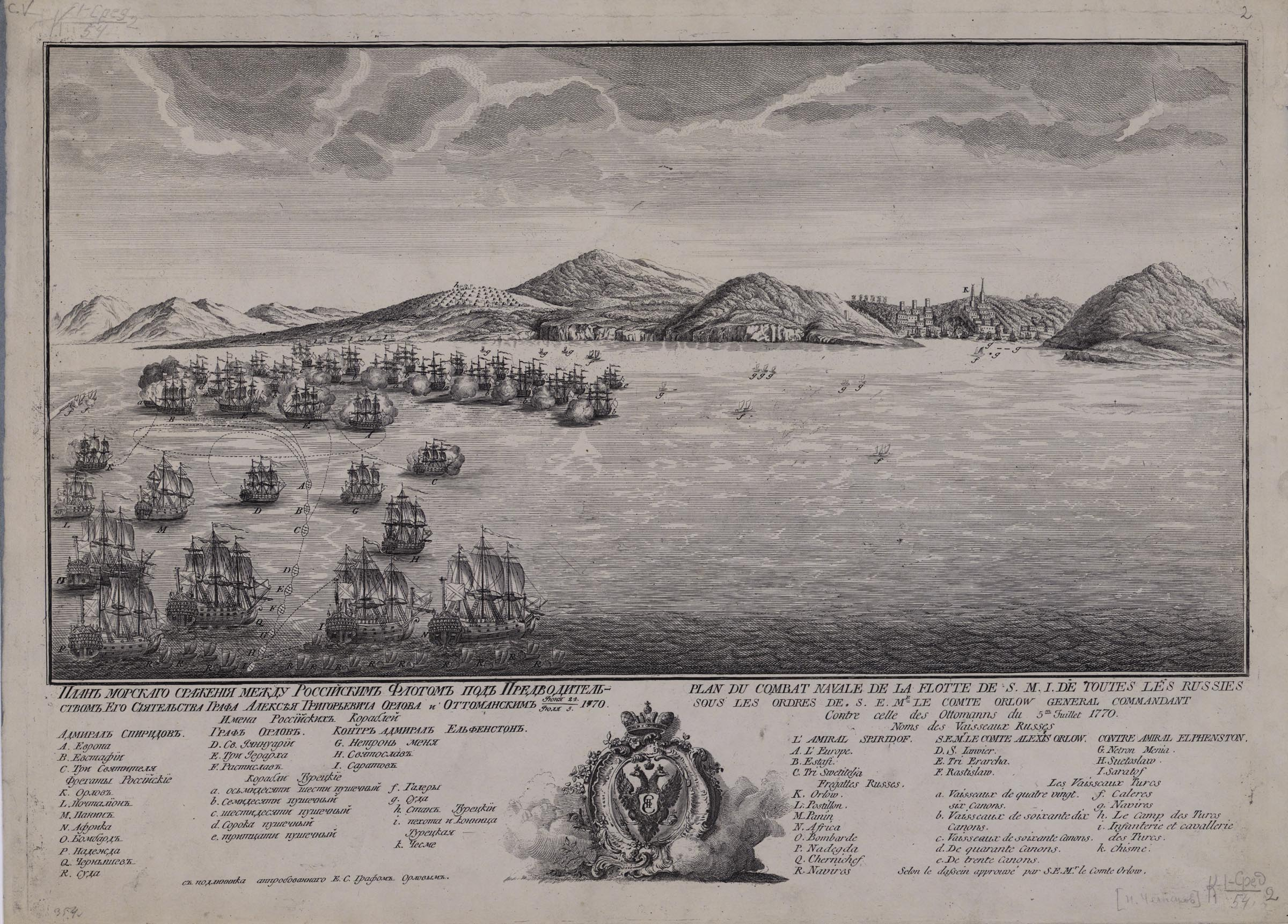
Battle plan for July 5 (in the Chios Strait)

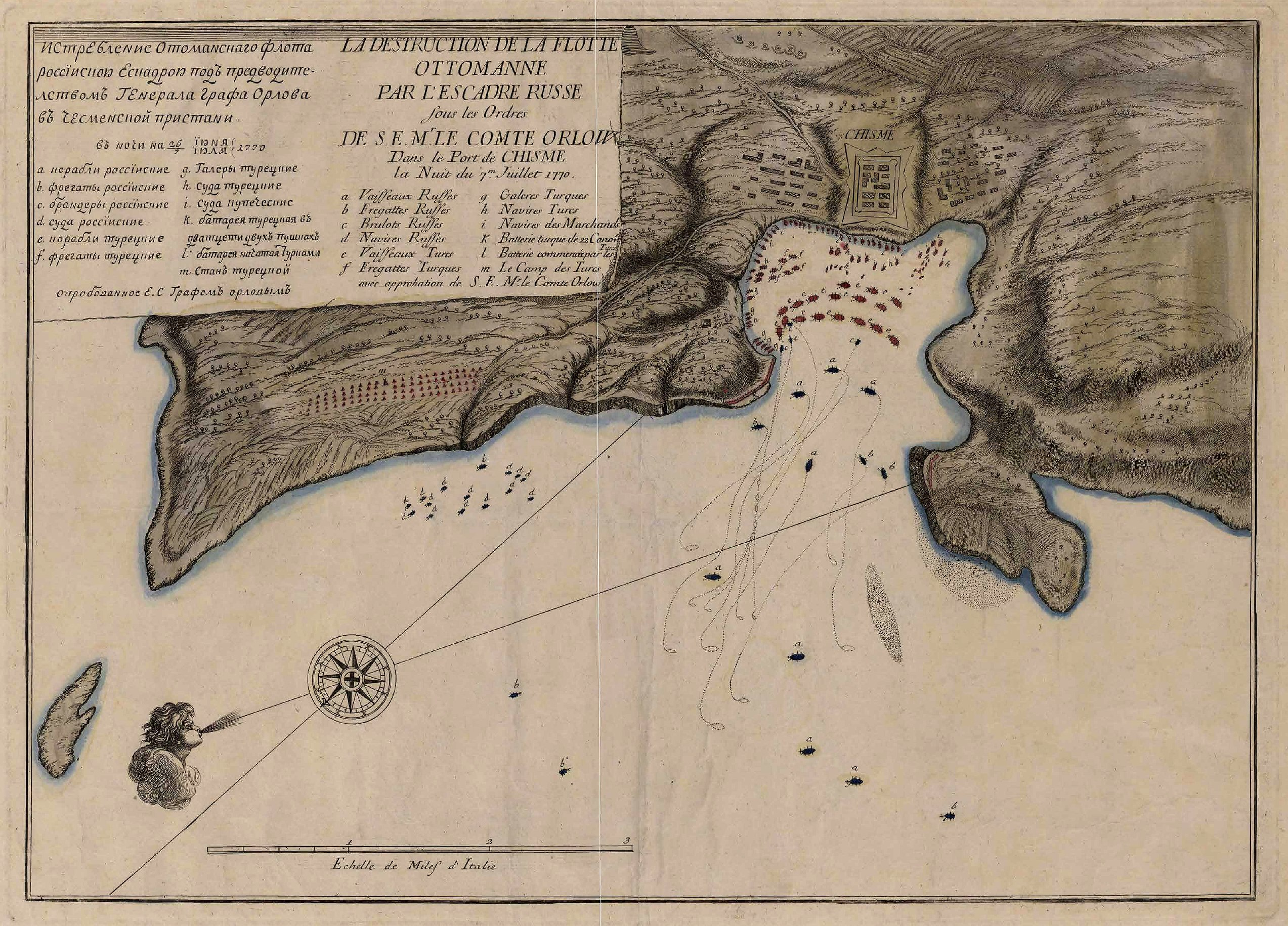
Battle plan for July 7 (in the Çeşme Bay)

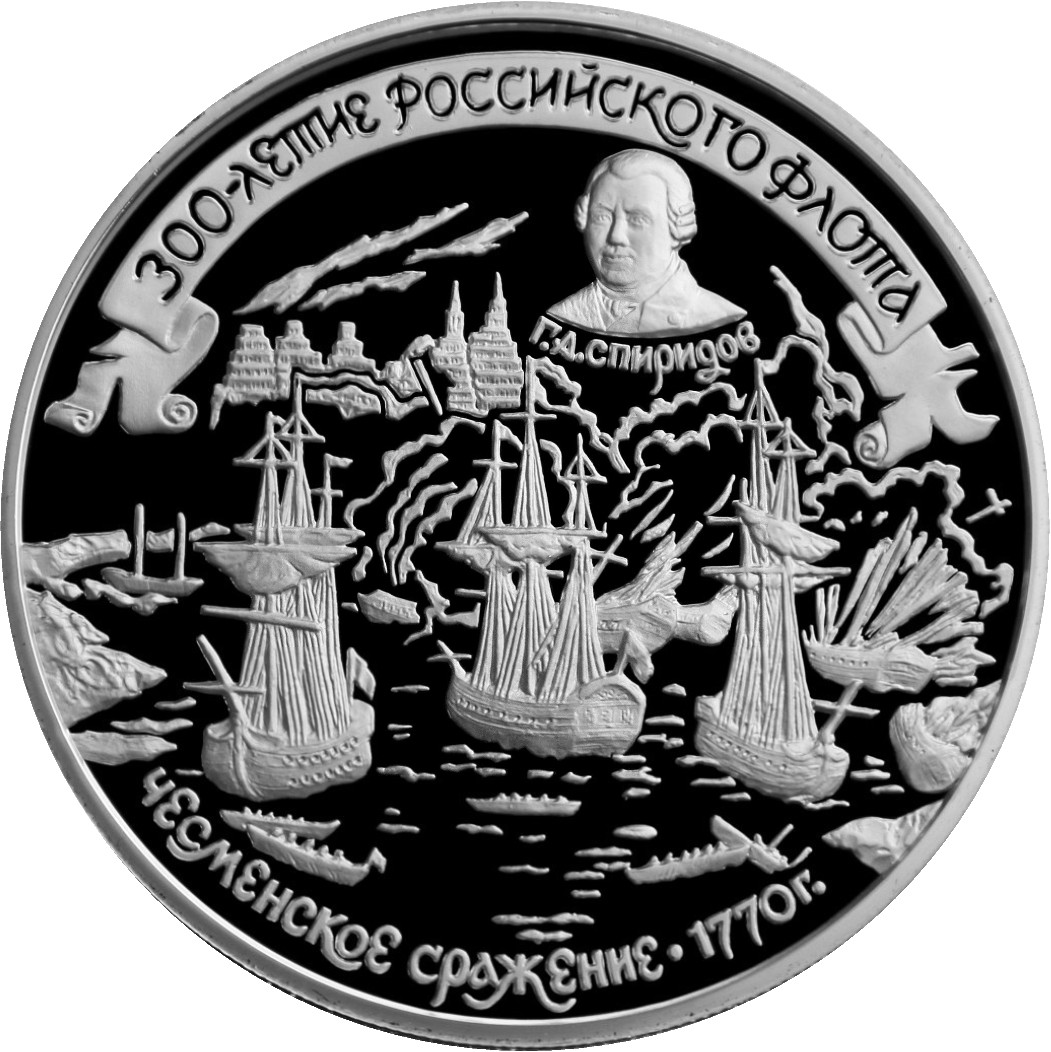
Russian silver coin
300th anniversary of the Russian Navy
G. A. Spiridov
- Battle of Chesma
- 1770

== See also ==
- Timeline of Ottoman history
- Action of 27 May 1770
- Action of 6 November 1772
- Action of 4 July 1773
- Action of 3 September 1773
- Action of 20 June 1774

== Bibliography ==
- Anderson, R. C. (1952). Naval Wars in the Levant 1559–1853. Princeton: Princeton University Press.
- İsipek, Ali Rıza ve Oğuz Aydemir (2006) 1770 Çeşme Deniz Savaşı: 1768–1774 Osmanlı-Rus Savaşları, Istanbul: Denizler Kitabevi, ISBN 975-00051-4-7 (in Turkish)
- Isipek Ali Rıza and Aydemir Oguz (2010) Battle of Çesme 1770. 1768–1774 Ottoman–Russian Wars, Istanbul, Denizler Kitabevi, ISBN 978-9944-264-27-3
- Velichko, Konstantin; Novitsky, Vasily; Schwartz, Alexey von; Apushkin, Vladimir; Schoultz, Gustav von (1912). Военная энциклопедия Сытина [Sytin Military Encyclopedia] (in Russian). Vol. VIII: Гимры – Двигатели судовые. Moscow: Типография Т-ва И. Д. Сытина.
- Arsenyev, Konstantin; Petrushevsky, Fyodor (1904). Brockhaus and Efron Encyclopedic Dictionary (in Russian). Vol. 80. Электровозбудительная сила – Эрготин. Friedrich A. Brockhaus (Leipzig), Ilya A. Yefron (St. Petersburg). p. 690.
- Polovtsov, Alexander (1912). Russian Biographical Dictionary. Vol. 24: Щапов – Юшневский. St. Petersburg: Типография Главного Управления Уделов. pp. 225–226.
- Tashlykov, S. L. (2017). "ЧЕСМЕНСКОЕ СРАЖЕНИЕ 1770". Great Russian Encyclopedia. Electronic version.
