= Samuel Greig =

British-born Russian naval officer (1735–1788)

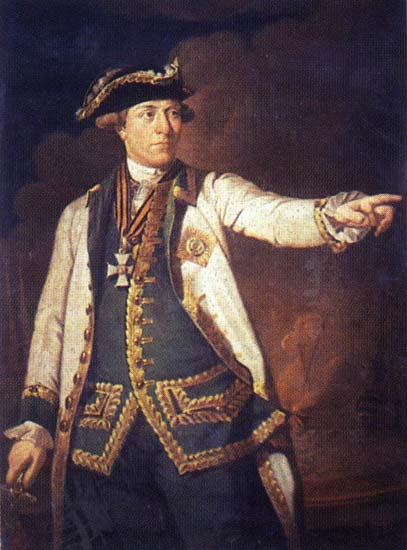
- Portrait by Ivan Argunov, 1773
- Born: Samuel Greig; 30 November 1735; Inverkeithing, Scotland
- Died: 26 October 1788 (aged 52); Reval, Russian Empire
- Burial place: St. Mary's Cathedral, Tallinn
- Relatives: Aleksey Greig (son); Samuil Greig (grandson)
- Military career
- Allegiance: Great Britain; Russia
- Branch: Royal Navy; Imperial Russian Navy
- Service years: 1758–1764 (Britain); 1764–1788 (Russia)
- Rank: Lieutenant (Britain); Admiral (Russia)
- Commands: Trekh Ierarkhov; Pobeda; Sviatoi Velikomuchenik Isidor
- Conflicts: Seven Years' War; Capture of Gorée; Le Havre raid; Battle of Quiberon Bay; Siege of Havana; Russo-Turkish War (1768–1774); Orlov revolt; Siege of Modon (1770); Battle of Chesma; Siege of Lemnos (1770); Bombardment of Negropont (Note: 1771; today Chalcis.); Blockade of the Dardanelles; Siege of the Mytilene Fortress (Note: At the siege that took place in 1771, Greig burned two Turkish warships under construction and a galley.); Assault on the Chesma Fortress (Note: Greig, commanding a detachment of ships, made a successful attack on the fortress of Chesma in 1772, where he burned the suburb with magazine.); Russo-Swedish War; Battle of Hogland; Blockade of Sveaborg (Note: During the naval blockade of the Swedish fleet at Sveaborg Greig took and burned the ship Gustav-Adolf.)
- Awards: Order of Saint George 2nd class Order of Saint Anna; Order of Saint Alexander Nevsky; Order of Saint Vladimir 1st class Order of Saint Andrew

Samuel Greig, also known as Samuil Karlovich Greig (Russian: Самуил Карлович Грейг; 30 November 1735 – 26 October 1788), was a Scottish-born Russian naval officer who served in the Seven Years' War, Russo-Turkish War and Russo-Swedish War. His son Aleksey Greig also served in the Imperial Russian Navy.

== Early life ==
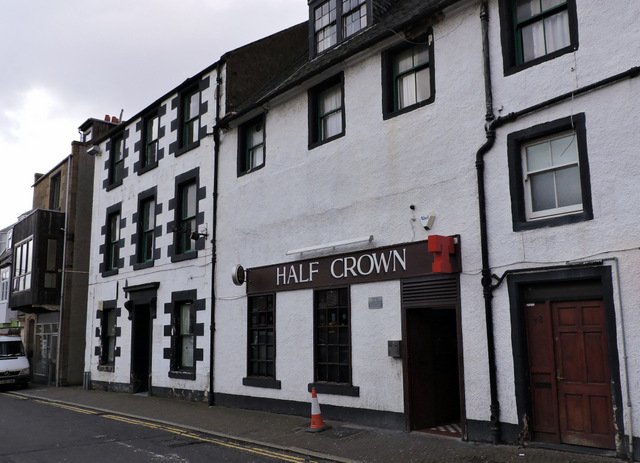
The Half Crown, Inverkeithing, former residence of Samuel Grieg.

Samuel Greig was born on 30 November 1735 in the burgh of Inverkeithing in Fife. Initially he worked as a seaman on his father's ships, then entered the Royal Navy before 1758 as a master's mate. He participated in the capture of Gorée in 1758, the Battle of Quiberon Bay in 1759 and the siege of Havana in 1762. Greig was promoted to acting lieutenant in 1761, though the Royal Navy took several years to confirm this rank.

When Catherine II of Russia became Empress in 1762 the Imperial Russian Navy needed revamping, and the court of Russia requested the government of Great Britain to send out some skilled British naval officers to improve Russian capabilities; Lieutenant Greig was selected as one of them. He entered the Russian service in 1764; his superior abilities there soon attracted the notice of the Russian government, and he was speedily promoted to the rank of captain.

== Family ==
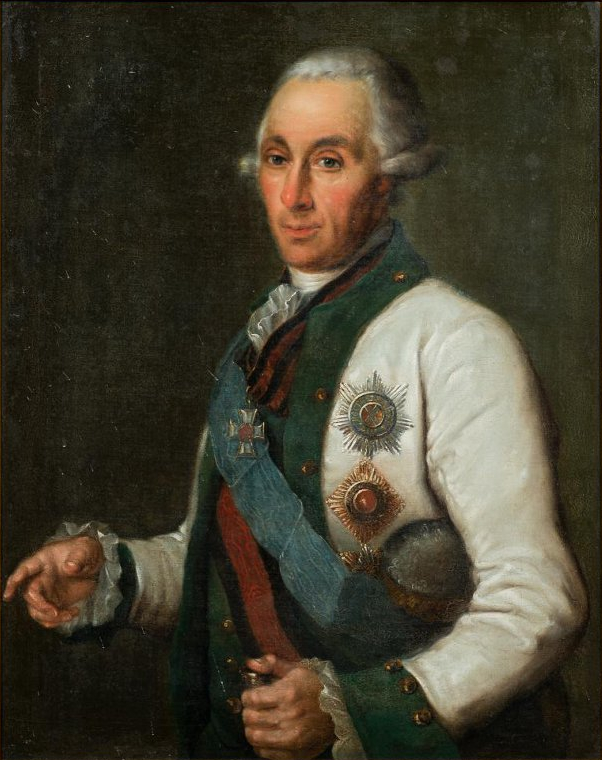
Portrait by Dmitry Levitzky, 18th century

Samuel Greig married Sarah (1752–1793), daughter of Alexander Cook. Their union would give rise to children and grandchildren who later married into the Russian and German nobility.

He was father to Aleksey Greig, admiral of the Imperial Russian Navy, who would go on to have his own spectacular career in the Russian Navy. Aleksey Greig would become a privy counsellor and knight of all the Imperial Russian Orders.

Greig was father-in-law to Scottish science writer and polymath, Mary Somerville who was a distant cousin of his. Somerville had married Greig's fourth son, Captain Samuil Samuilovich Greig (1778–1807), who was the Russian Consul in London. They had two sons before Greig died in 1807, one of whom, Woronzow Greig (1805–1865) became a barrister and scientist.

Another son, Ivan Samuilovich Greig (1776–1802), traveled to China but was never heard of again.

His grandson Samuil Alexeyvich Greig (1827–1887) was the Russian Minister of Finance 1877–80. A general-lieutenant, he took part in the defence of Sebastopol during the Crimea War. He is buried in Smolenskoe Lutheran Cemetery in St. Petersburg.

== The Battle of Chesma ==
When some time after the war broke out between the Russians and the Turks, Captain Greig was sent in 1770 under the command of Count Alexey Orlov and Admiral Grigory Spiridov, with a fleet to the Mediterranean. The Turkish fleet of around 15 ships of the line plus frigates and galleys which they met near Chesma Bay, western Turkey, was much superior to the Russian force of 9 ships of the line and 3 frigates. After a severe and sanguinary but indecisive battle, the Turkish fleet retired during the night close into Chesma Bay, where they were protected by batteries on land. Notwithstanding the formidable position which the enemy had taken up, the Russian admiral determined to pursue, and if possible destroy these by means of his fire-ships.

At one o’clock in the morning, Captain Greig bore down upon the enemy with his fire ships and succeeded in totally destroying the Turkish fleet. Captain Greig, on this occasion assisted by another British officer, a Lieutenant Drysdale, who acted under him, set the match to the fire ships with his own hands. This perilous duty performed, he and Drysdale leaped overboard and swam to their own boats, under a tremendous fire from the Turks, and at the imminent hazard besides of being destroyed by the explosion of their own fire ships. Following up this success, the Russian fleet now attacked the town and batteries on shore, and by nine o’clock in the morning there was scarcely a vestige remaining of the town, fortifications, or fleet. For this important service, Captain Greig, who had been appointed commodore on his being placed in command of the fire-ships, was immediately promoted by Count Orlov to the rank of admiral, an appointment which was confirmed by an express from the Empress of Russia.

A peace was soon afterward concluded between the two powers, but this circumstance did not lessen the importance of Admiral Greig's services to the government by which he was employed. He continued indefatigable in his exertions in improving the Russian fleet, remodeling its code of discipline, and by his example infusing a spirit into every department of its economy, which finally made it one of the most formidable marines in Europe. These important services were fully appreciated by the empress, who rewarded them by promoting Greig to the high rank of admiral of the Russian Empire, and governor of Kronstadt. In 1782 he was elected a Fellow of the Royal Society.

== Battle of Hogland ==
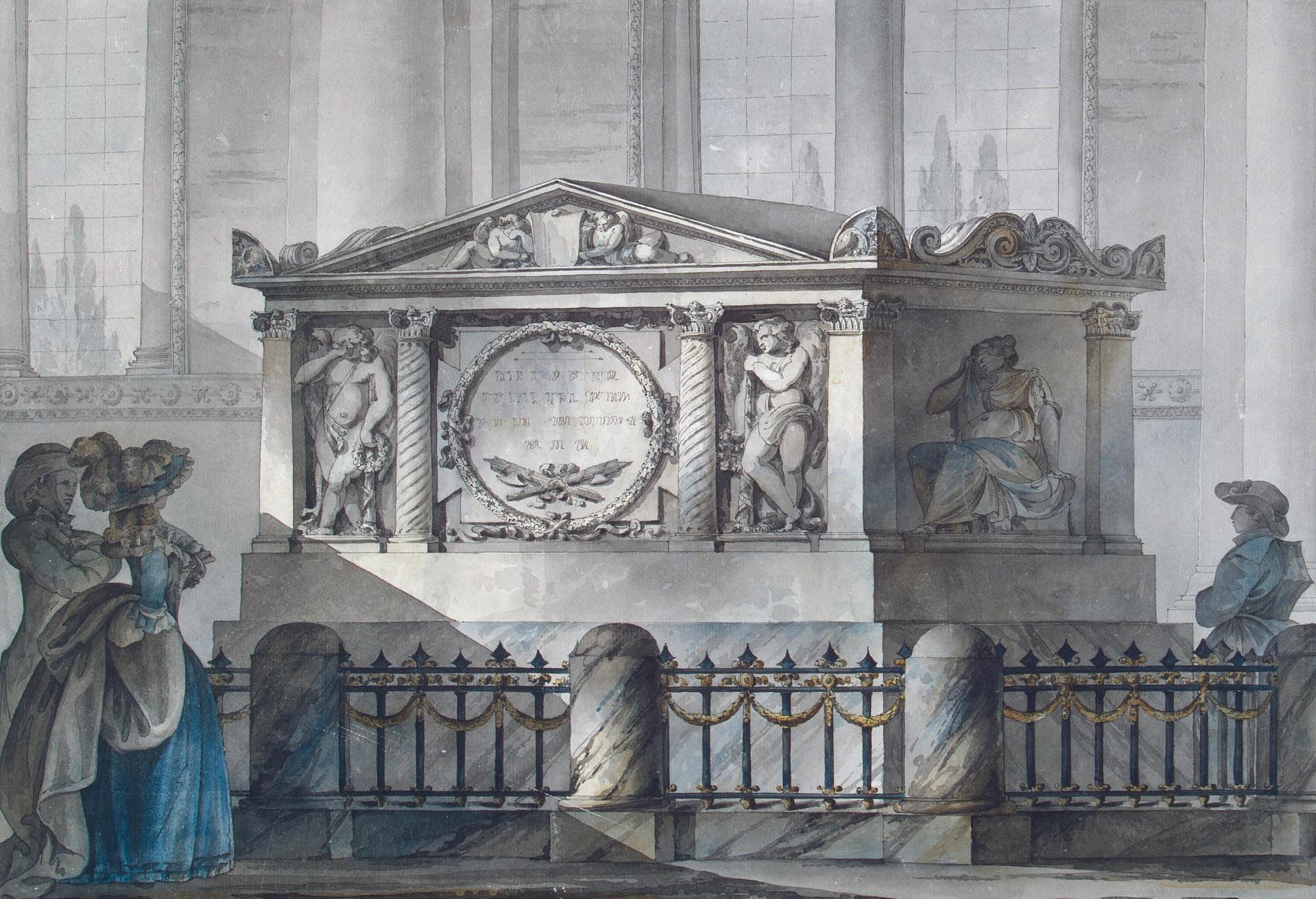
Greig's tomb, designed by Giacomo Quarenghi

Admiral Greig was then swept away by the Russo-Swedish War that broke out in the summer of 1788. He fought an inconclusive battle against the Swedish navy during the Battle of Hogland and he then went to the Swedish fortress of Sveaborg, which he put under a blockade. He was however attacked by a violent fever, and having been carried to Reval, died on 26 October 1788, on board of his own ship, Rostislav, after a few days' illness, in the 53rd year of his life. As soon as the empress heard of his illness, she, in the utmost anxiety about a life so valuable to herself and her empire, instantly sent for her first physician, Dr Rogerson, and ordered him to proceed immediately to Revel and to do every thing in his power for the admiral's recovery. Dr Rogerson obeyed, but all his skill was unavailing.

The admiral’s funeral was held at Tallinn Cathedral and was conducted with full state honors. In the days preceding the ceremony, his body lay in state at the Admiralty hall. It was later transported to the cathedral on a funeral bier drawn by six horses and accompanied by a public procession that included members of the nobility, clergy, and naval and military officers. Troops formed an escort, while bells tolled and cannon were fired from the ramparts and fleet. The ceremony reflected the high regard in which he was held. Empress Catherine II of Russia commissioned the architect Giacomo Quarenghi to design Greig’s tomb.

== Honours ==
In 1864, Greigia is a genus of the botanical family Bromeliaceae is named after him, by Eduard August von Regel (a director of the St Petersburg Botanical Garden). Then in 1873, Regel named a species of Tulip after him, Tulipa greigii. Due to Greig once being president of the Russian Horticultural Society.

== Family ==
His eldest son Samuel Greig married Mary Fairfax, daughter of Sir William George Fairfax, who later married Dr William Somerville and became famous in her own right as Mary Somerville.

== Sources ==
- This article incorporates text from Biographical Dictionary of Eminent Scotsmen originally edited by Robert Chambers and published by Blackie and Son of Glasgow, Edinburgh, and London in 1856. This work is in the public domain.
- Velichko, Konstantin; Novitsky, Vasily; Schwartz, Alexey von; Apushkin, Vladimir; Schoultz, Gustav von (1912). Военная энциклопедия Сытина [Sytin Military Encyclopedia] (in Russian). Vol. VIII: Гимры – Двигатели судовые. Moscow: Типография Т-ва И. Д. Сытина.
- "Грейг, адмиралы и государственные деятели" . Brockhaus and Efron Encyclopedic Dictionary (in Russian). 1906.
