= Action of 3 September 1773 =

1773 naval battle of the Russo-Turkish War (1768–1774)

This minor battle took place on 3 September 1773 between Russia and the Ottoman Empire during the Russo-Turkish War (1768–1774). Alternative source (Chernyshev): Cruising as part of a squadron under Kinsbergen, on August 23 and September 5 twice spotted an Ottoman force, but apparently the Ottoman force did not engage.

== Ships involved ==
=== Russia ===
Frigate (1 of 2 "numbered" frigates built on Sea of Azov, 32 guns, 160 crew)

Vtoroy 32, F.V.Neyelov

Small 2 masted warships (3 of a series of 7 built on Sea of Azov; 14*14 pounder guns, 2 howitzers, 128 crew)

Azov 16 S.M.Retyunskiy
Zhurzha 16 S.A.Tokmachev
Modon 16 P.D.Chvostov

Other

? (gunboat)
? (fireship)

=== Ottoman Empire ===
3 battleships
4 frigates
3 xebecs
8 others which didn't take part
