= Action of 4 July 1773 =

1773 naval battle of the Russo-Turkish War (1768–1774)

- Part of Russo-Turkish War (1768–1774)
Location	Black Sea

Belligerents
(Russia) Russian Empire	Ottoman Empire

Commanders and leaders
Jan Hendrik van Kinsbergen	

Strength
2 small vessels	4 ships

The action of 4 July 1773 was an engagement of the first Russo-Turkish War (1768–74), between naval units of Russian Empire and the Ottoman Empire.

This indecisive battle took place on 4 July 1773 between 2 small Russian vessels under Jan Hendrik van Kinsbergen and 4 Ottoman ships.

== Ships involved ==
Russian Empire

- Taganrog 16
- Koron 16

Ottoman Empire

- ? 52
- ? 52
- ? 52
- ? 24 (xebec)
