= The Half Crown, Inverkeithing =

The Half Crown
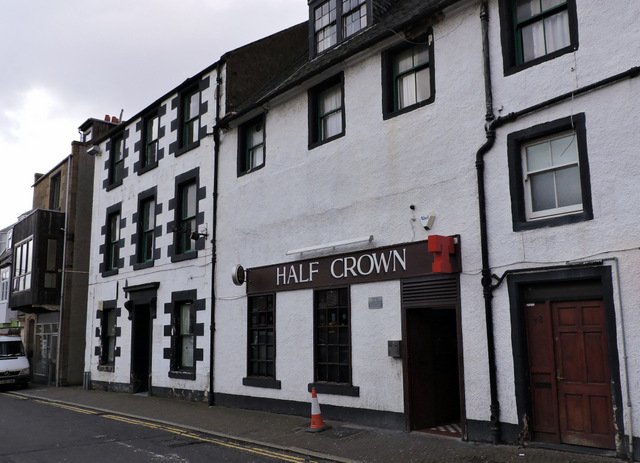
- The Half Crown, 2015.

- Shown in Fife
- 56°01′49″N 3°23′52″W
- Location: High Street, [Inverkeithing]

History
- Built: Circa 1670 - 1680

Listed Building – Category C(S)
- Designated: 19/12/1979
- Part of: 34, 36, 38, 40 HIGH STREET
- Reference no.: LB35098

The Half Crown is a public house in Inverkeithing in Fife, Scotland. The building dates from 1670 - 1680, and is notable as the former residence of Samuel Greig. The building was formerly the Royal Hotel.

== History ==
Circa 1670 to 1680, the building housing the Half Crown was constructed. The building was known for its "massive staircase" and "characteristic buttressed chimneys".

In the early 18th century, Samuel Greig lived his early life in the building. In 1763, Russia requested Britain for officers to help in the remodelling of naval armaments. Greig was sent and would become known as the 'father of the Russian Navy'; serving in the Seven Years' War, Russo-Turkish War and Russo-Swedish War. He was awarded the Order of St George by Catherine the Great, and received a state funeral after his death in 1788. A commemorative plaque to him graces the wall of the pub.

The building was formerly used as The Royal Hotel, which incorporated much of 34 - 40 High Street.

The interior features a well, first mentioned in plans from the 19th century, which has been converted into a coffee table.

== Photographs ==
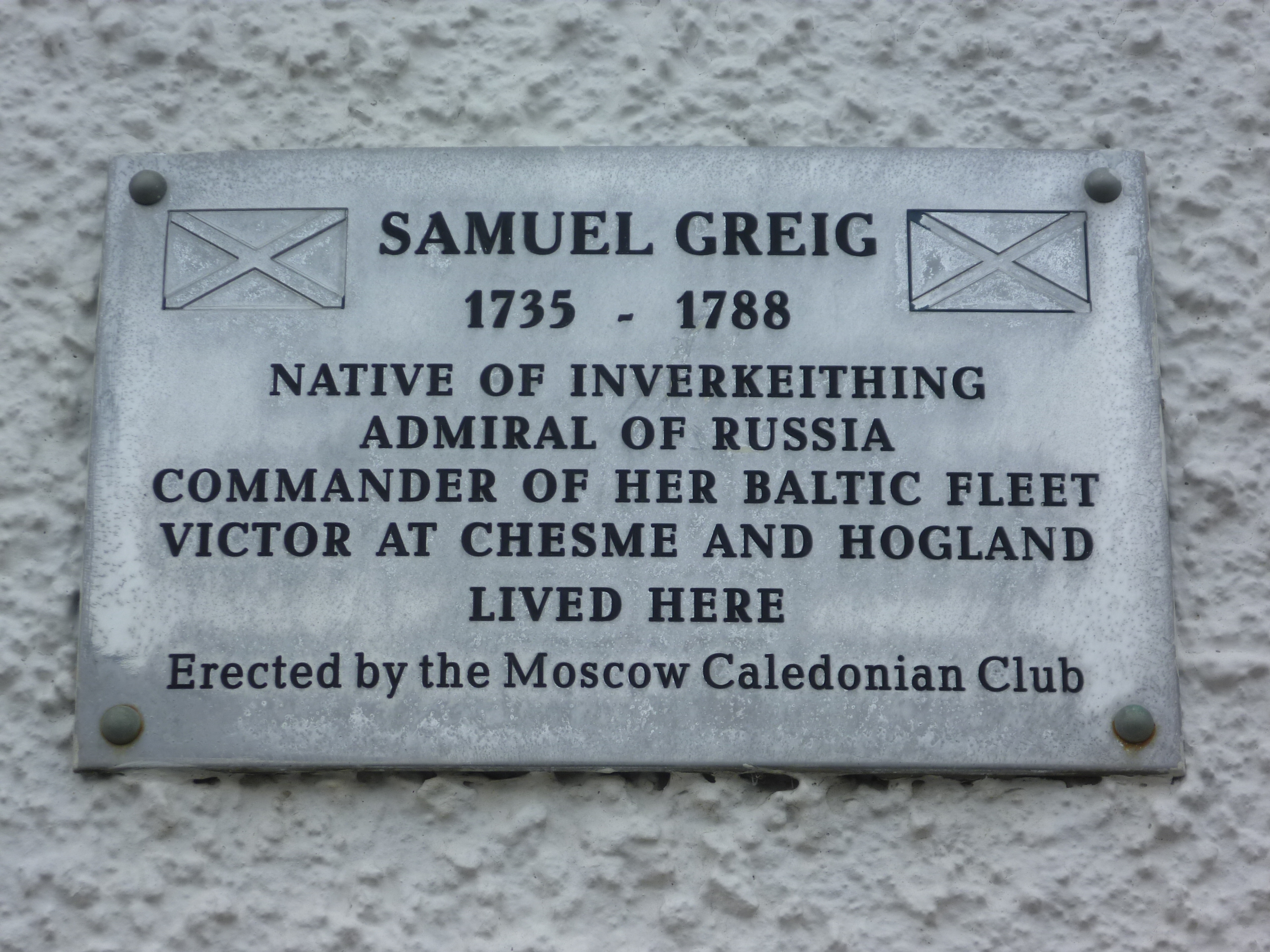
The Half Crown Samuel Grieg plaque.

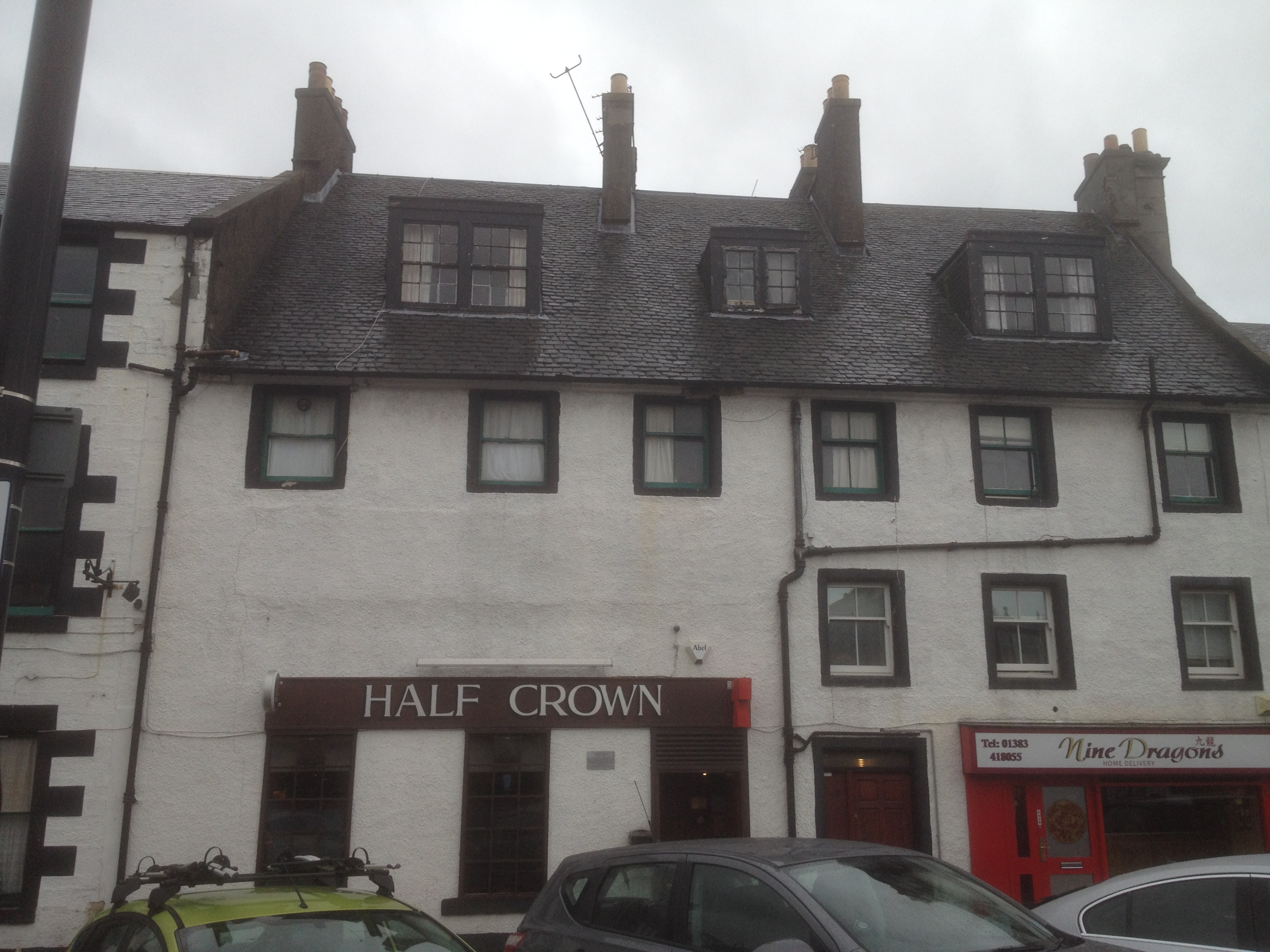
The Half Crown pub as part of 34 - 40 High St.
