= Alexei Grigoryevich Orlov =

Russian military officer and statesman (1737–1808)

Count Alexei Grigoryevich Orlov Chesmensky
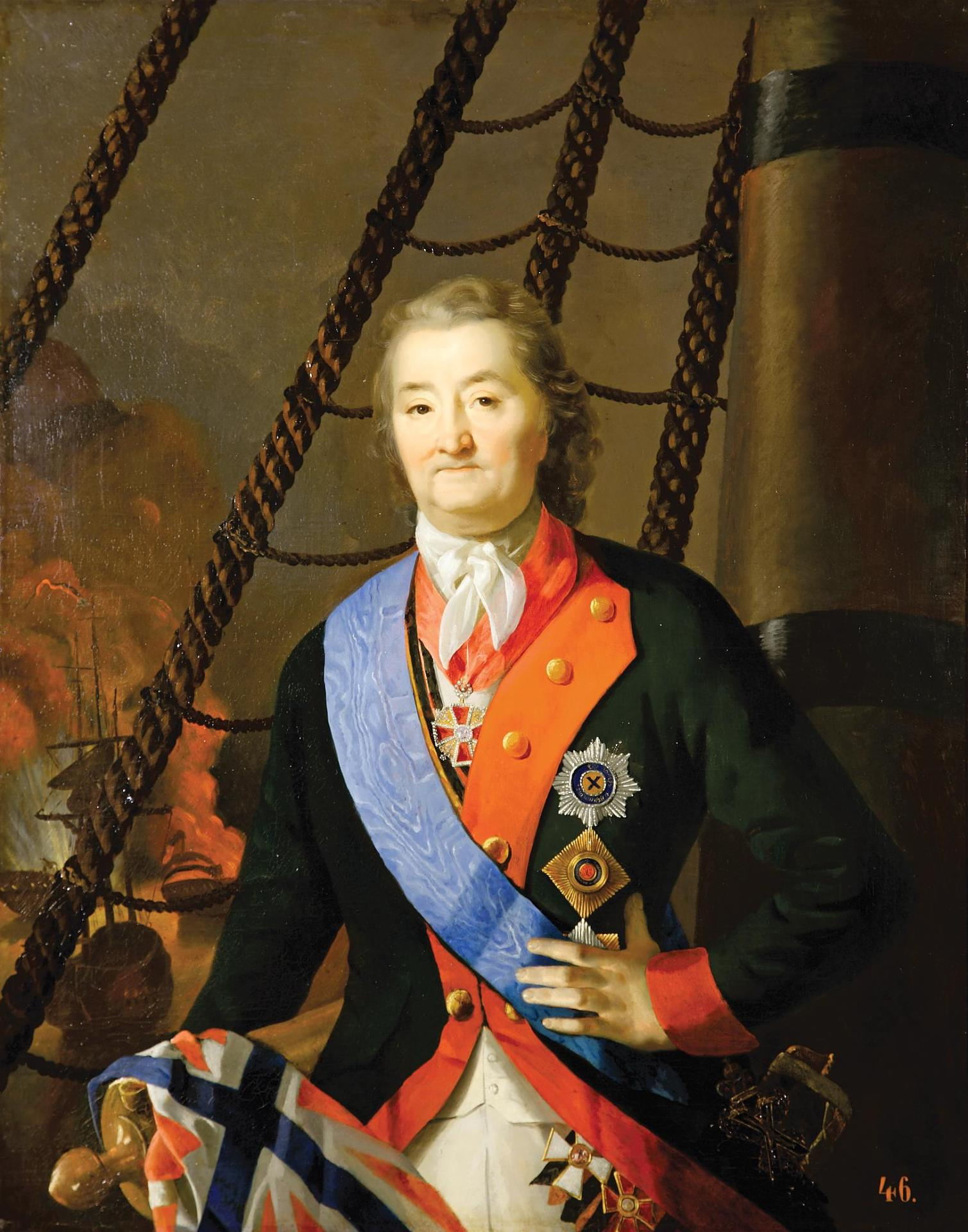
- 1850 portrait of Orlov
- Born: 5 October [O.S. 24 September] 1737; Lyutkino, Russia
- Died: 5 January 1808 [O.S. 24 December 1807] (aged 70); Moscow, Russia
- Education: First Cadet Corps
- Children: Anna Orlova-Chesmenskaya
- Relatives: House of Orlov; Grigory Grigoryevich Orlov (brother)
- Military career
- Allegiance: Russia
- Branch: Imperial Russian Army; Imperial Russian Navy
- Service years: 1749–1775
- Rank: General-in-Chief (Russian Army); General Admiral (Russian Navy)
- Units: Semyonovsky Life Guards Regiment; Preobrazhensky Life Guards Regiment
- Commands: Baltic Fleet
- Known for: Government work, diplomacy, horse breeding.
- Conflicts: Seven Years' War; Russo-Turkish War (1768–1774); Orlov revolt; Battle of Chesma; Napoleonic Wars
- Awards: Order of St. Andrew; Order of St. George

Count Alexei Grigoryevich Orlov-Chesmensky (Russian: Алексей Григорьевич Орлов-Чесменский; 5 October [O.S. 24 September] 1737 – 5 January 1808 [O.S. 24 December 1807]) was a Russian military officer and statesman who rose to prominence during the reign of Catherine the Great. His joint victory with Grigory Spiridov and Samuel Greig in the Battle of Chesma put him in the ranks of the outstanding Russian military commanders of all time; and although he lacked naval experience, he was the only authority in those circumstances who could ensure proper co-ordination of action.

Orlov served in the Imperial Russian Army, and through his connections with his brother, became one of the key conspirators in the plot to overthrow Tsar Peter III and replace him on the Russian throne with his wife, Catherine. The plot, carried out in 1762, was successful, and Peter was imprisoned under Alexei Orlov's guard. He died shortly afterwards under mysterious circumstances, and it was popularly believed Orlov had either ordered, or personally carried out, his murder. Handsomely rewarded by Catherine after her accession, the Orlovs became powerful at court. Alexei was promoted and took part in the Russo-Turkish War of 1768–74, commanding a naval expedition to the Mediterranean in 1770, which destroyed the Ottoman fleet at the battle of Chesma. For his success he was granted the honorific Chesmensky. The Russian victory sparked off the Orlov Revolt in the Greek territories of the Ottoman Empire soon afterwards.

Orlov remained in the Mediterranean, and received the unusual commission of seducing and then capturing Princess Tarakanoff, a pretender to the Russian throne. Orlov was successful in doing so, and tricked her into boarding a Russian ship at Livorno, where she was arrested and transported to Russia. Alexei's brother, Grigory, Catherine's lover before and after the coup overthrowing Tsar Peter III took place, fell from favour soon afterwards, and the Orlovs' power at court diminished. Alexei became a renowned breeder of livestock at his estates, developing the horse breed known as the Orlov Trotter and popularising the Orloff breed of chicken. He left Russia after the death of Catherine and the accession of her son, Tsar Paul I, but returned after Paul's death and lived in Russia until his death in 1808.

== Family and early life ==
Alexei was born into the noble Orlov family, presumably in Lyutkino (Liutkino), which is now in Tver Oblast, on 5 October [O.S. 24 September] 1737; the son of Grigory Ivanovich Orlov, governor of Novgorod, and brother of Grigory Grigoryevich Orlov. He entered the Preobrazhensky Regiment and by 1762 had reached the rank of sergeant. He was involved in the Seven Years' War. He was described as a giant of a man, over two meters tall, and a celebrated duellist, with a scar across his cheek. The scar earned him the nickname 'scarface'.

== Involvement in the 1762 coup ==
Together with his brother Grigory, Alexei Orlov became involved in the palace coup to overthrow Tsar Peter III and place his wife, Catherine, on the Russian throne. In the coup, carried out in July 1762, Alexei went to meet Catherine at the Peterhof Palace, and finding her in bed, announced 'the time has come for you to reign, madame.' He then drove her to St Petersburg, where the guards regiments there proclaimed their loyalty to her. The Tsar was arrested and imprisoned at Ropsha, under the guard of Alexei Orlov. There Peter died in mysterious circumstances on 17 July [O.S. 6 July] 1762. Orlov is popularly supposed to have murdered him, either on his own initiative or on Catherine's orders. One account has Orlov giving him poisoned wine to drink which caused

... flames [to course] through his veins. This aroused suspicion in the overthrown emperor and he refused the next glass. But they used force, and he defended himself. In that horrible struggle, in order to stifle his cries, they threw him on the ground and grabbed his throat. But he defended himself with the strength that comes from final desperation, and they tried to avoid wounding him. They placed a rifle strap on the emperor's neck. Alexei Orlov kneeled with both legs on his chest and blocked his breathing. He passed away in their hands.

They thought that Orlov apparently wrote a letter to Catherine after Peter's death, confessing that Peter had been killed in a drunken brawl with one of his jailers, Feodor Bariatynsky, and taking the blame. The authenticity of this letter has been questioned nowadays. It was announced that the Tsar had died from an attack of haemorrhoidal colic.

== Service under Catherine II ==
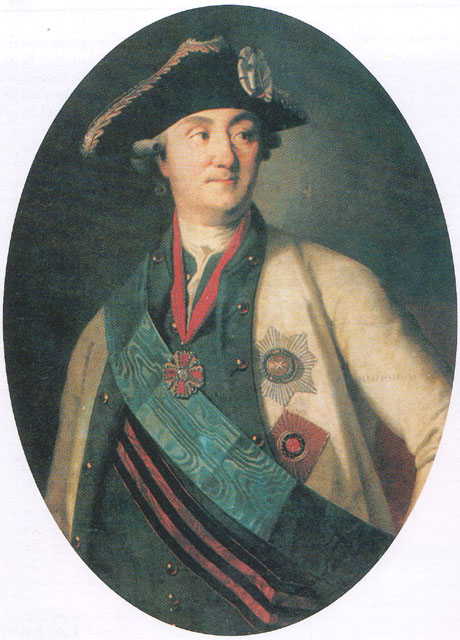
Oval portrait of Alexei Orlov by Carl-Ludwig Christinek, 1779

The Orlovs were rewarded after Catherine's accession, and Alexei was promoted to the rank of major-general, and given the title of count. He and his brother received 50,000 roubles and 800 serfs. Despite a lack of formal education and his ignorance of foreign languages, he maintained an interest in science, patronizing Mikhail Lomonosov and Denis Fonvizin, and corresponding with Jean Jacques Rousseau. He was one of the founders of the Free Economic Society and its first elected chairman. Rewarded with large estates, he took an interest in horse breeding, developing the Orlov Trotter, and popularising the breed of chicken now known as the Orloff.

He became involved in military operations during the Russo-Turkish War of 1768–1774, organising the First Archipelago Expedition, and commanding of a squadron of the Imperial Russian Navy, having been promoted to the rank of general admiral. He fought and won the Battle of Chesma against an Ottoman fleet on 5 July 1770, with the help of British naval expertise, and received the right to add the honorific 'Chesmensky' to his name. He was also awarded the Order of St. George First Class. His expedition sparked off the Orlov Revolt in Greece, which despite initial successes, lacked continued Russian support, and was eventually put down by the Ottomans. Orlov was sent as plenipotentiary to the talks at Focşani in 1772, but his impatience caused the breaking off of negotiations, which led to dissatisfaction from the Empress.

Catherine then commissioned Orlov to make contact with Yelizaveta Alekseyevna, a pretender to the throne claiming to be the daughter of Empress Elizabeth of Russia, and deliver her to Russia. Orlov did so by pretending to be a supporter of hers, and successfully seducing her. He then lured her aboard a Russian ship at Livorno in May 1775, where she was arrested by Admiral Samuel Greig and taken to Russia, where she was imprisoned and later died. Shortly after this service, the Orlovs fell from favour at court, and Alexei and Grigory were dismissed from their positions. Orlov retired to the Sans Ennui Palace near Moscow, and gave luxurious balls and dinners, making himself 'the most popular man in Moscow.'

== Old age and death ==
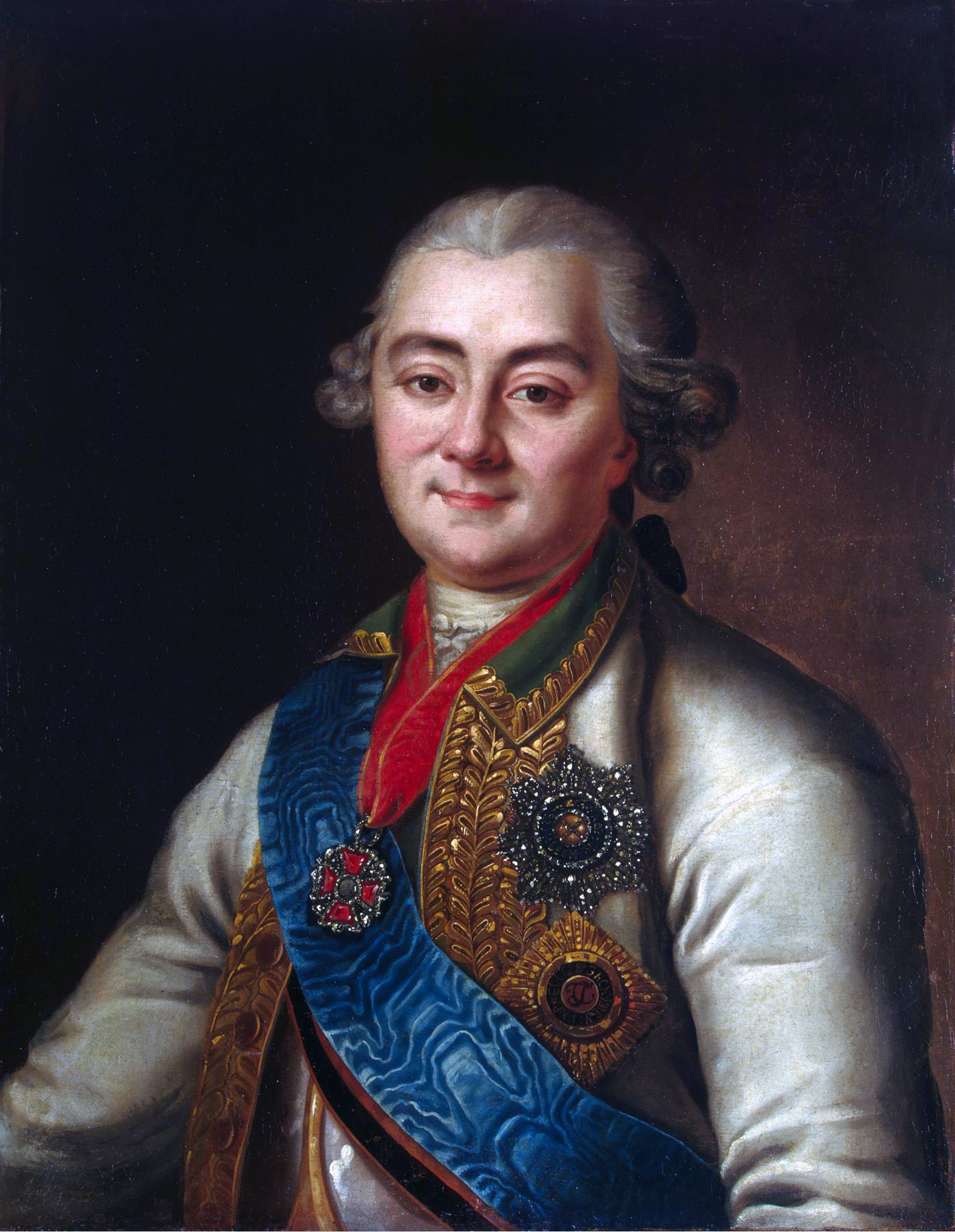
Alexey Orlov by an unknown artist of the 18th century. Hermitage Museum

After Catherine's death in 1796 the new ruler, Tsar Paul I ordered that his father, Peter III, be reburied in a grand ceremony. Alexei Orlov was ordered to carry the Imperial Crown in front of the coffin. Orlov was briefly suspected of having been one of the assassins of Peter III. Orlov left Russia during the reign of Paul I, but returned to Moscow after his death and the accession of Tsar Alexander I. Orlov commanded the militia of the fifth district during the War of the Fourth Coalition in 1806–07, which was placed on a war footing almost entirely at his own expense.

Alexei Grigoryevich Orlov died in Moscow on 5 January 1808 [O.S. 24 December 1807]. He left an estate worth five million roubles and 30,000 serfs. His marriage with Eudokia Nikolayevna Lopukhina (contracted on 6 May 1782) produced a daughter, Anna Orlova-Tshesmenskaja (1785–1848), and a son, Ivan (1786–1787). Eudokia died while giving birth to Ivan in 1786. Orlov also is believed to have had an illegitimate son named Alexander (1763–1820).
