= Grigory Spiridov =

Imperial Russian Navy officer (1713–1790)

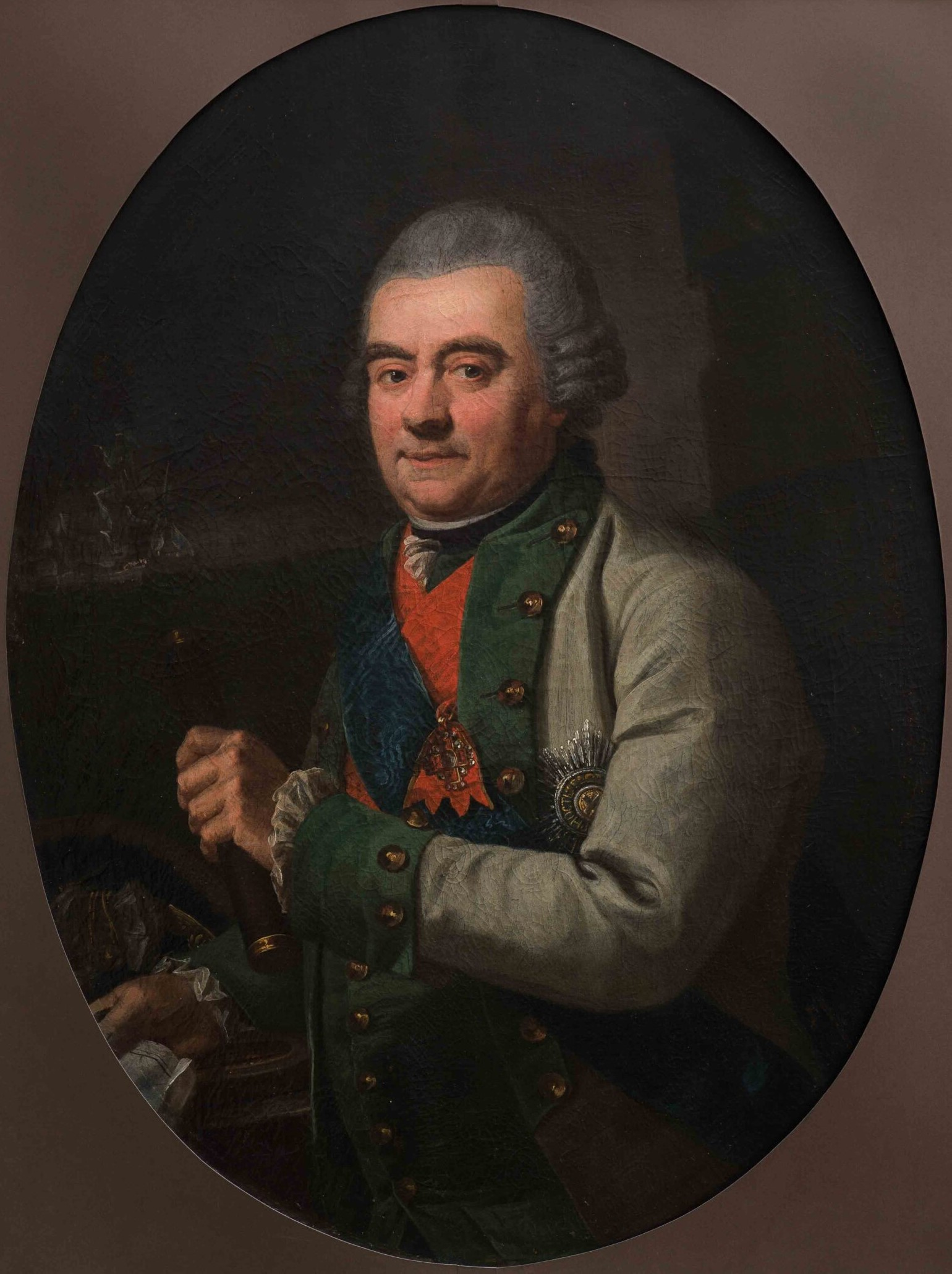
- Portrait of Spiridov
- Native name: Григорий Спиридов
- Born: Grigory Andreyevich Spiridov; 1713; Vyborg, Russia
- Died: April 19, 1790 (aged 76–77) Moscow, Russia
- Buried: Nagorye
- Allegiance: Russia
- Branch: Imperial Russian Navy
- Service years: 1723–1774
- Rank: Admiral
- Conflicts: Seven Years' War; Russo-Turkish War (1768–1774); Battle of Chesma
- Awards: Order of Saint Andrew; Order of Saint George

Admiral Grigory Andreyevich Spiridov (Russian: Григорий Андреевич Спиридов; 1713 – 19 April 1790) was an Imperial Russian Navy officer who is considered to be one of the greatest naval commanders in Russian military history.

== Life ==
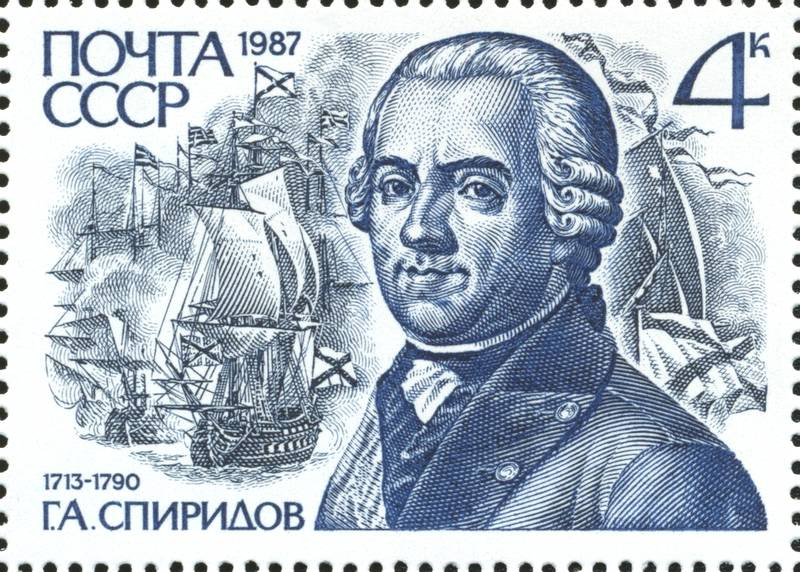
Spiridov on the Soviet postage stamp

=== Early naval career ===
Grigory Spiridov was born into a Russian noble family in 1713. He began his career in the Russian Navy in 1723. He received the rank of midshipman at the age of 15. In 1732, he was transferred to Kronstadt and received the rank of warrant officer. He then took the position of adjutant under Peter Bredal in 1738.

Spiridov had been commanding different ships of the Baltic Fleet since 1741, when he was transferred to Arkhangelsk. In 1754, he received the rank of captain of the third rank. During the Seven Years' War of 1756–1763, he was in charge of a landing party of two thousand men when Peter Rumyantsev was laying siege to the fortress of Kolberg in Pomerania. In 1762, Spiridov was promoted to the rank of rear admiral and assigned to command a squadron for securing the contact with the Russian army in Prussia. In 1764, he was appointed commander of the port of Reval and then Kronstadt (1766).

=== Russo-Turkish War ===
During the Russo-Turkish War of 1768–1774, Spiridov was in charge of a squadron, which would be sent from the Baltic Sea to the Mediterranean to assist the Greeks in their struggle against the Turks in the summer of 1769 (see Orlov revolt and First Archipelago Expedition). In early 1770, he commanded the seizure of Mistra, Arcadia, and Navarino with the help of a landing party.

On 5 July [O.S. 24 June] 1770, a Russian squadron under the nominal command of Alexei Grigoryevich Orlov with Spidirov in charge of the van attacked an Ottoman Navy fleet in the Chios Strait and forced it to hide in Chesma Bay. On the night of 26 June (7 July N.S.), the Russian squadron under the actual command of Spiridov and Samuel Greig destroyed the Ottoman fleet during the Battle of Chesma and established Russian naval supremacy in the Aegean Sea.

Spiridov was awarded the Order of St. Andrew the First-Called, and Greig was awarded the Order of St. George. In 1771–1773, Spiridov commanded the Russian fleet in this region. When he resigned from the Russian Navy in 1774, many attributed it to his resentment that all the credit for his victories went to Orlov.

== Sources ==
- "Спиридов, Григорий Андреевич" . Brockhaus and Efron Encyclopedic Dictionary (in Russian). 1906.
- Kamenskii, Alexander (15 September 2020). "Spiridov, Grigory Andreyevich (1713–1790)". Catherine the Great: A Reference Guide to Her Life and Works. Bloomsbury Publishing USA. pp. 127–128. ISBN 979-8-7651-7026-7.
