= Russo-Turkish War (1768–1774) =

Sixth conflict of the Russo-Turkish wars

Russo-Turkish War of 1768–1774
- Part of the series of Russo-Turkish wars
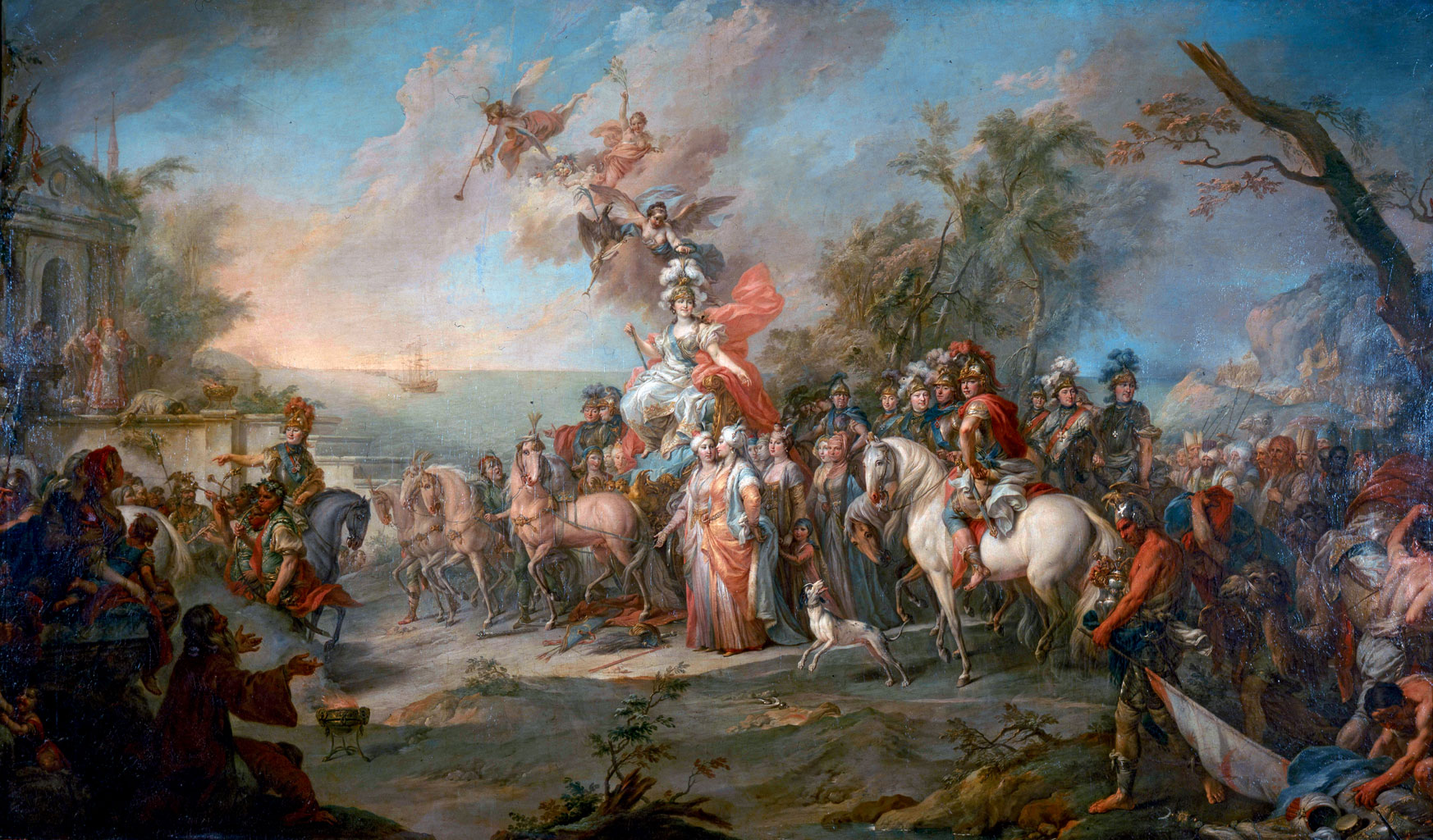
- Allegory of Catherine's Victory over the Turks (1772), by Stefano Torelli.
Date	1768–1774
Location	Eastern Europe, Caucasus, Mediterranean
Result	Russian victory: • Treaty of Küçük Kaynarca
Territorial changes	Ottoman Empire cedes Kerch, Enikale and part of Yedisan to Russia. Crimean Khanate becomes a Russian client state.

Belligerents
Russian Empire; Collegium of Little Russia 1764–1786 (former Hetmanate); Zaporozhian Host; Kabardia; Kalmyk Khanate; Kingdom of Kartli-Kakheti; Kingdom of Imereti; Sultanate of Egypt (1768–1772); Zayadani Sheikhdom Greek insurgents Maniots	Ottoman Empire; Crimean Khanate; Emirate of Mount Lebanon; Pashalik of Scutari; Ottoman Egypt (1772–1774); Circassia Bar Confederation

Commanders and leaders
(Russian Empire) Catherine II (Russian Empire) Pyotr Rumyantsev (Russian Empire) Vasily Dolgorukov-Krymsky (Russian Empire) Alexey Orlov (Russian Empire) Samuil Greig (Russian Empire) Ivan Saltykov (Russian Empire) Alexander Suvorov (Russian Empire) Alexander Golitsyn (Russian Empire) Weismann von Weißenstein † (Russian Empire) Mikhail Kamensky (Russian Empire) Marko Voinovich (Russian Empire) Fyodor Ushakov (Russian Empire) Gottlieb Heinrich Totleben # (Note: Died of natural causes at Warsaw on 20 March 1773) (Russian Empire) Mikhail Kutuzov (Russian Empire) Grigory Potemkin (Russian Empire) Jan Hendrik van Kinsbergen; Petro Kalnyshevskyi; Ubashi Khan; Erekle II; Solomon I Ali Bey al-Kabir (executed); Abu al-Dhahab (1768–1772); Daher al-Umar; Panagiotis Benakis X	(Ottoman Empire) Mustafa III # (1768–1774) (Ottoman Empire) Abdul Hamid I (1774) (Ottoman Empire) Ivazzade Halil Pasha (Ottoman Empire) Mandalzade Hüsameddin Pasha (Ottoman Empire) François Baron de Tott; Qaplan II Giray # (Note: Died of natural causes in 1771) (Polish–Lithuanian Commonwealth) Karol Radziwiłł; Casimir Pulaski; Michał Jan Pac; Count Benyovszky; Abu al-Dhahab (1772–1774)

The Russo-Turkish War of 1768–1774 was a major armed conflict that saw Russian armies victorious against the Ottoman Empire. Russia's victory brought the Yedisan between the rivers Bug and Dnieper, and Crimea into the Russian sphere of influence. Though a series of victories accrued by the Russian Empire led to substantial territorial conquests, including direct conquest over much of the Pontic–Caspian steppe, less Ottoman territory was directly annexed than might otherwise be expected due to a complex struggle within the European diplomatic system to maintain a balance of power that was acceptable to other European states and avoided direct Russian hegemony over Eastern Europe.

Nonetheless, Russia took advantage of the weakened Ottoman Empire, the end of the Seven Years' War, and the withdrawal of France from Polish affairs to assert itself as one of the continent's primary military powers. The war left the Russian Empire in a strengthened position to expand its territory and maintain hegemony over the Polish–Lithuanian Commonwealth, eventually leading to the First Partition of Poland. Turkish losses included diplomatic defeats which led to its decline as a threat to Europe, the loss of its exclusive control over the Orthodox millet, and the beginning of European bickering over the Eastern question that would feature in European diplomacy until the dissolution of the Ottoman Empire in the aftermath of World War I.

== Background ==
=== Russian war with Poland ===
The war followed internal tensions within Poland which indirectly challenged the security of the Ottoman Empire and its ally, the Crimean Khanate. The true power behind the Polish throne was the Russian ambassador Nicholas Repnin and the Imperial Russian Army, with King Stanisław August Poniatowski being elected due to his ties as a former favourite of the Empress Catherine II of Russia. Repnin had forcefully imposed the Perpetual Treaty of 1768 between Poland and Russia, which was disadvantageous to Poland geopolitically, challenged the political supremacy of Poland's Catholic faith, prevented reform of the liberum veto, and allowed Warsaw's occupation by Russian troops. Rising unrest led to the massive revolt of the Bar Confederation, which became an alliance of noble, Roman Catholic, and peasant rebels.

In the fortified town of Bar, near the Ottoman border, the Bar Confederation was created on 29 February 1768, led by a Polish nobleman named Casimir Pulaski. While the Russian army heavily outnumbered the confederates and defeated them several times in direct battle in Podolia, Ukraine, bands of rebels waged a low-scale guerrilla war throughout Ukraine and southern Poland. On 20 June 1768, the Russian Army captured the fortress of Bar but when one band of surviving confederates fled to the Turkish border, pursuing troops, including Zaporozhian Cossacks, clashed with janissary garrison troops. Polish revolts continued to trouble Russia throughout the war and make it impossible for Catherine II to keep control of Poland.

=== Ottoman situation ===
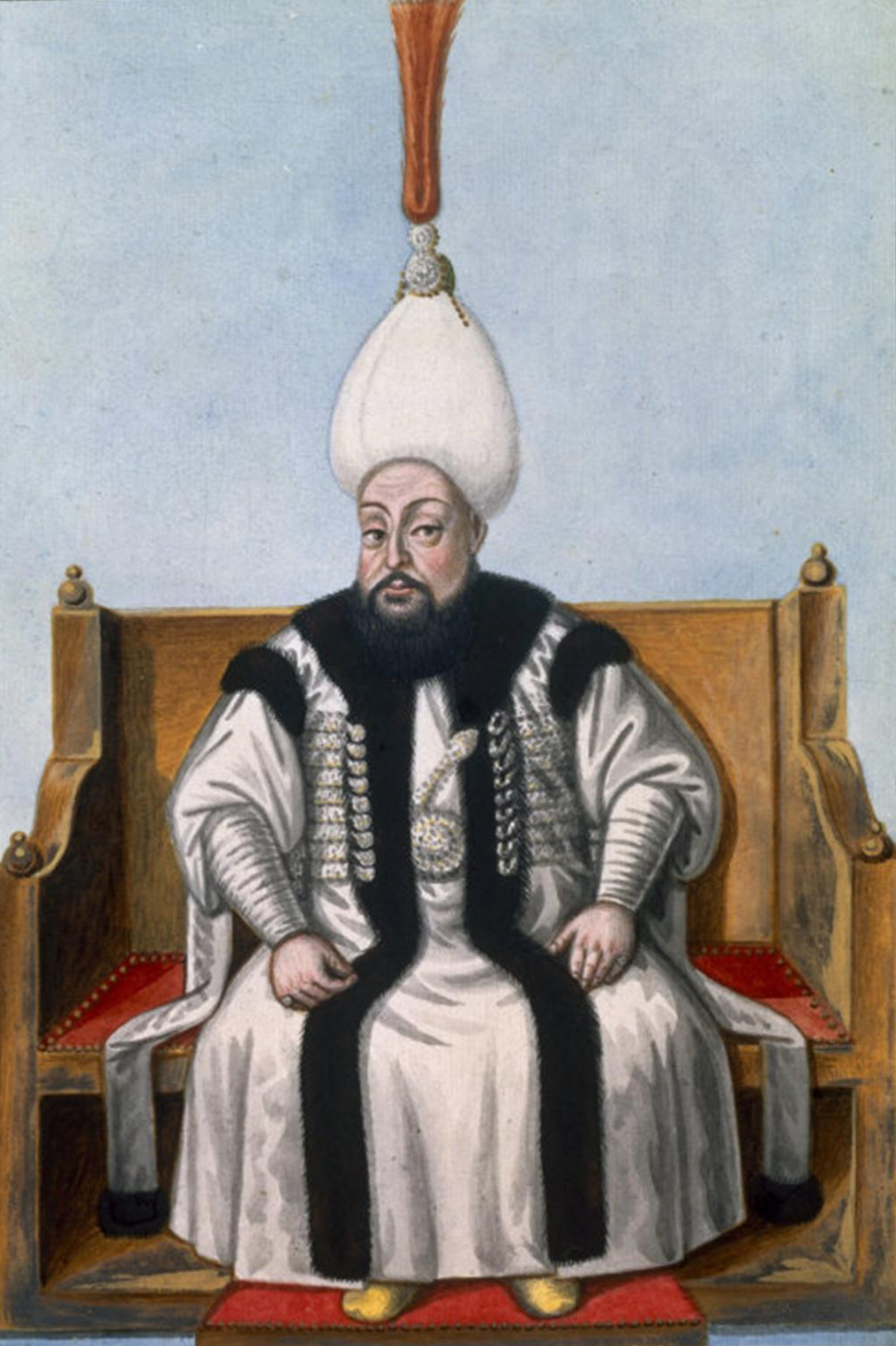
Mustafa III in his royal robes

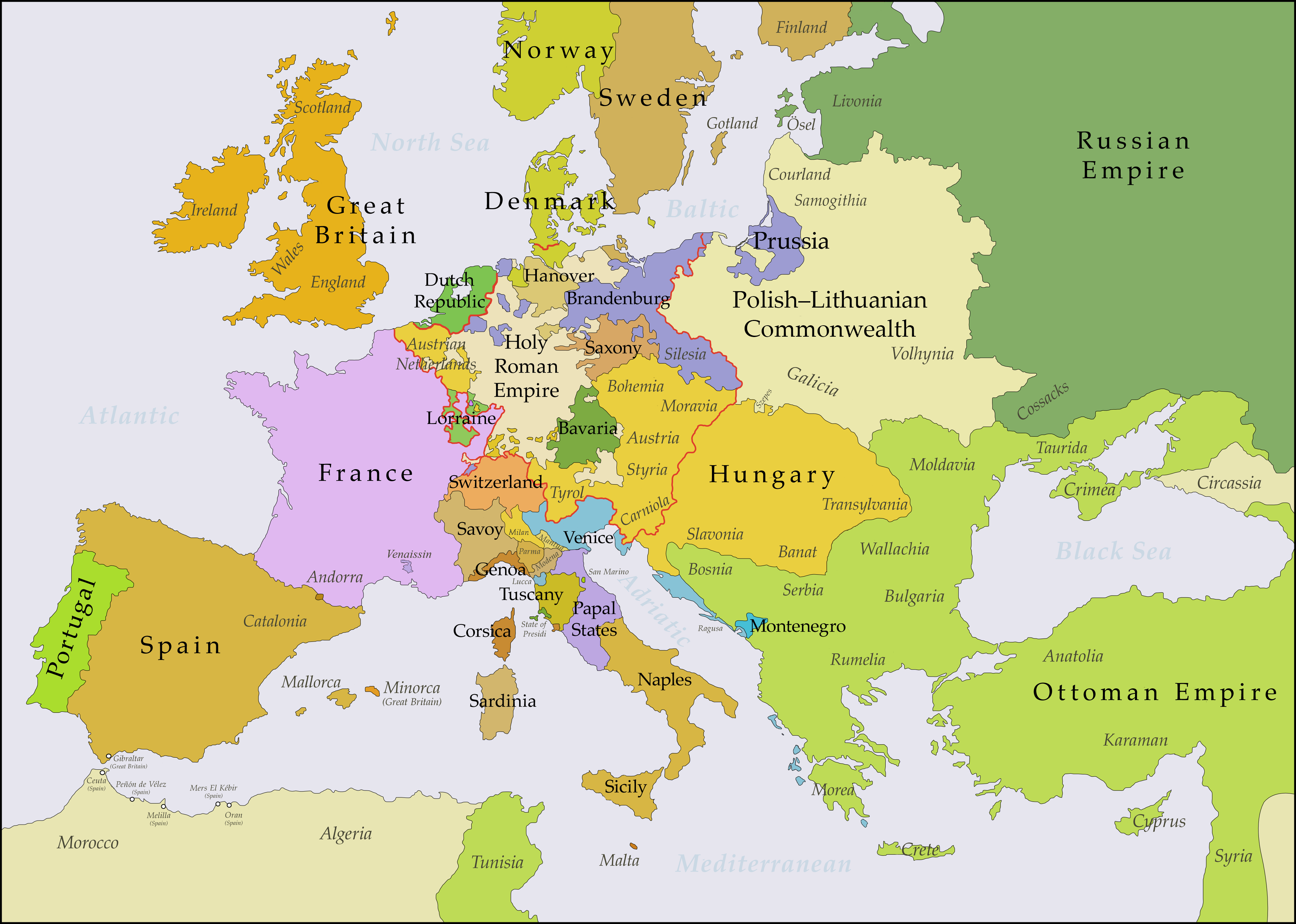
Europe before the war

In the Ottoman Empire, revolts were widespread. Many noble factions had risen against the power of Sultan Mustafa III and would proceed to break away from the Ottoman Empire. In addition to this decentralization of the empire the Ottomans also faced the revival of a unified Persia, which rose to oppose the Turks in Iraq.

Upon the outbreak of the war, the Ottomans seemed to have the upper hand as Russia was suffering from financial strain as a consequence of its involvement in the Seven Years' War. The Ottoman Navy capitalized on the inferiority of the Imperial Russian Navy, even though Russia employed British officers to address this weakness. The Ottomans dominated the Black Sea, giving it the advantage of shorter supply lines. The Ottomans were also able to levy troops from their vassal state, the Crimean Khanate, to fight the Russians, but their effectiveness was undermined by constant Russian destabilization of the area. In the years preceding the war the Ottoman Empire had enjoyed the longest period of peace with Europe in its history (1739–1768). Nevertheless, the Ottoman Empire faced internal division, rebellion and corruption compounded by the re-emergence of a unified Persian leadership, under Nader Shah. One clear advantage for the Ottomans was its superior numbers as the Ottoman army was three times the size of its Russian counterpart. However, the new Grand Vizier Mehmed Emin Pasha would prove himself to be incompetent militarily. The Russian army massed along the borders with Poland and the Ottoman Empire, which made it difficult for Ottomans troops to make inroads into Russian territory.

== Russian invasion ==
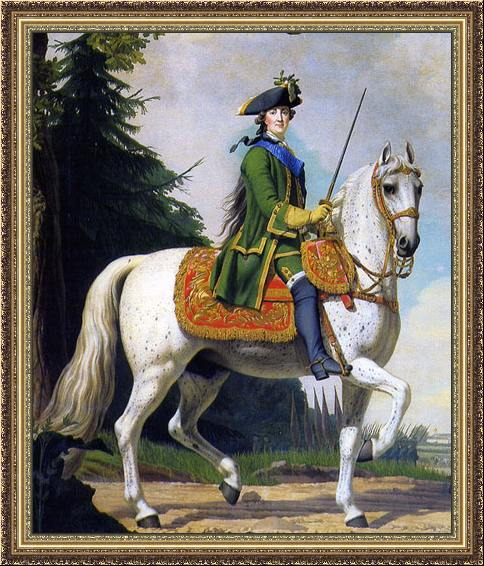
Equestrian portrait of Catherine in the uniform of the Preobrazhensky Regiment (by Vigilius Eriksen)

Not content to let the Polish enemy flee over the border, Cossacks followed them into the Ottoman Empire. In the summer of 1768, Mustafa III received reports that the town of Balta had been massacred by Russian paid Zaporozhian Cossacks. Russia denied the accusations, but it was reported that the Cossacks "certainly razed Balta and killed whomever they found". With the confederates of Poland and the French embassy pushing the sultan along, with many pro-war advisors, the sultan on October 6 imprisoned Aleksei Mikhailovich Obreskov and the entire Russian embassy's staff, marking the Ottoman's declaration of war on Russia.

After her victories in the war, Catherine II was depicted in portraits dressed in the military uniforms of Great Britain, initially a willing ally because of the trade between the two countries. Great Britain needed bar iron to fuel its nascent Industrial Revolution, as well as other products such as sailcloth, hemp, and timber for the construction and maintenance of its Navy; Russia could provide all these. When the tide of the conflict turned in Russia's favour, Britain limited its support, now seeing Russia as a rising competitor in Far Eastern trade, rather than merely as a counterbalance to the French Navy in the Mediterranean. While Russia remained in a superior position in the Black Sea, the withdrawal of British support left Russia unable to do more than shorten its own supply lines and disrupt Turkish trade in the area.

In January 1769, a 70-thousand man Turkish-Tatar army led by Crimean Khan Qırım Giray invaded the lands of central Ukraine. Crimean Tatars, Turks, and Nogais ravaged New Serbia, taking a significant number of slaves.

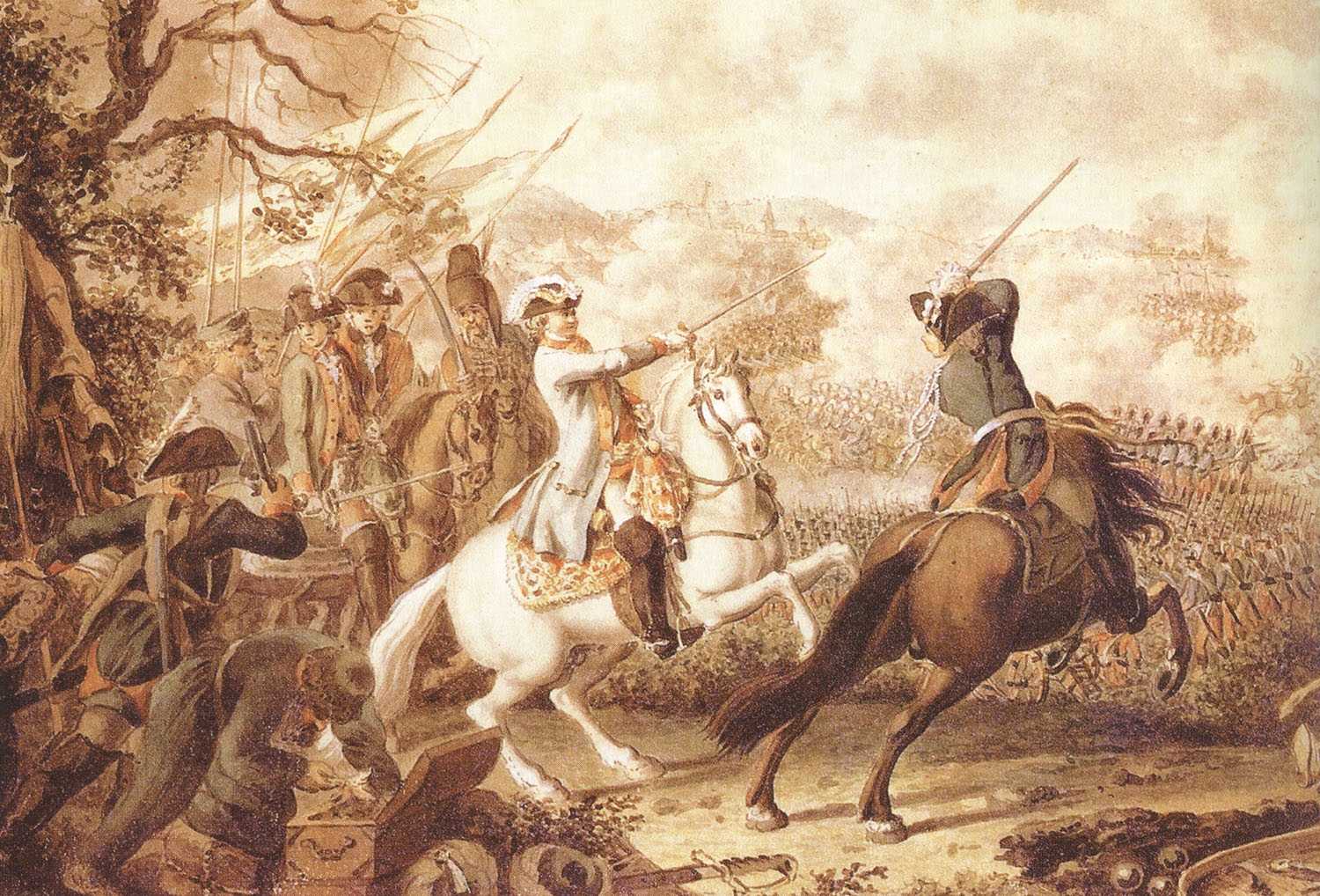
Battle of Kagul, Southern Bessarabia, 1770

On September 17, 1769, the Russians began their initial campaign over the Dniester into Moldavia. The elite Ottoman janissaries took heavy casualties from the Russians at Khotyn but managed to hold on; the remainder of the Ottoman army panicked and abandoned the field, and the Russians claimed the fortress. With the Ottomans in disarray the Russians took the capital of Moldavia (Jassy) on October 7. They continued the advance south into Wallachia, occupying its capital Bucharest on November 17. From the capital of Bucharest, the Russians fanned out through the principality, only later being challenged by Grand Vizier Mehmed Emin Pasha at Kagul on Aug 1, 1770. The Russians routed the Grand Vizier's forces and allegedly one-third of the Ottoman troops drowned in the Danube trying to escape.

== Caucasian front ==
By now, Russia had some troops spread out north of the Caucasus. In 1769, as a diversion, the Russians sent Gottlieb Heinrich Totleben with a small expeditionary force south into Georgia. The Georgians defeated an Ottoman army at Aspindza in 1770. The Siege of Poti on the Black Sea coast by a joint Russo-Georgian force in 1771 failed and Russian troops were withdrawn in the spring of 1772. It was the first time Russian troops had crossed the Caucasus. On the steppes north of the mountains, the later-famous Matvei Platov and 2,000 men fought 25,000 Turks and Crimeans. The Cossack village of Naur was defended against 8,000 Turks and tribesmen.

== Russian Mediterranean expedition ==
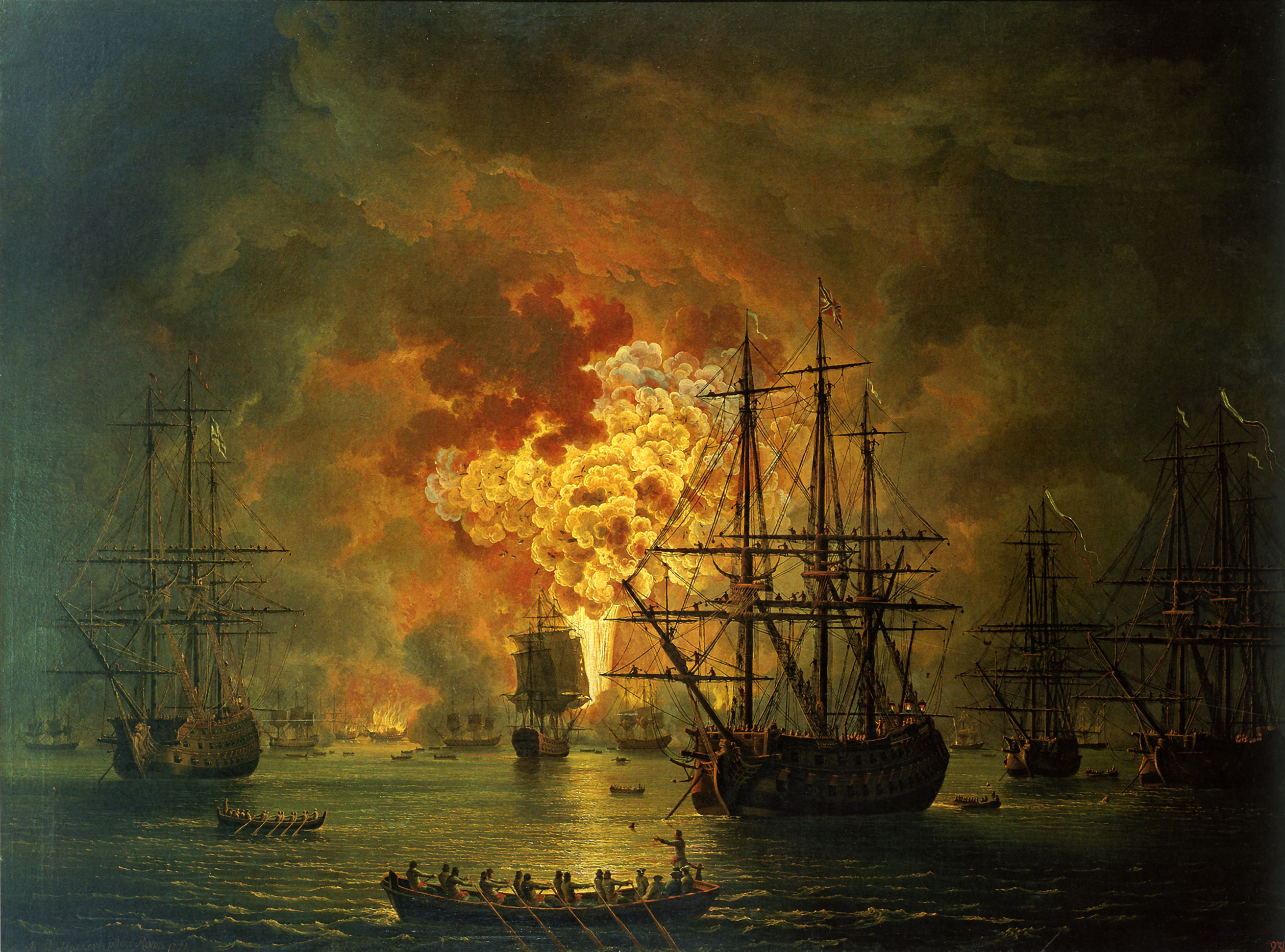
The destruction of the Turkish fleet in the Battle of Chesma, 1770

During the war, a Russian fleet, under Count Alexei Grigoryevich Orlov, entered the Mediterranean Sea for the first time in history. This First Archipelago Expedition of 1769 to 1774, with ships drawn from the Baltic Fleet, aimed to draw Ottoman naval forces out from the Black Sea. In Ottoman Greece, Orlov's arrival sparked a Maniot revolt against the Ottoman authorities. However, the Ottoman vizier Muhsinzade Mehmed Pasha (in office 1765 to 1768 and 1771 to 1774) called on the provincial notables (ayans) of Ottoman Albania to mobilize irregular troops, which he used to crush the revolt in 1771.

Just off the coast of the city of Chesma in present-day İzmir Province, on June 24, 1770, twelve Russian ships engaged twenty-two Turkish vessels and destroyed them with the use of fire ships. The Russian victory at Chesma demoralized the Ottomans, and bolstered Russian morale. Catherine II used this and other victories over the Turks to consolidate her power domestically, commissioning medals in honour of the battle. Despite their naval success, though, the Russians were unable to capture Constantinople because of Ottoman fortifications, as well as because of concerns in Western Europe that it would upset the balance of power.

== In the Middle East ==
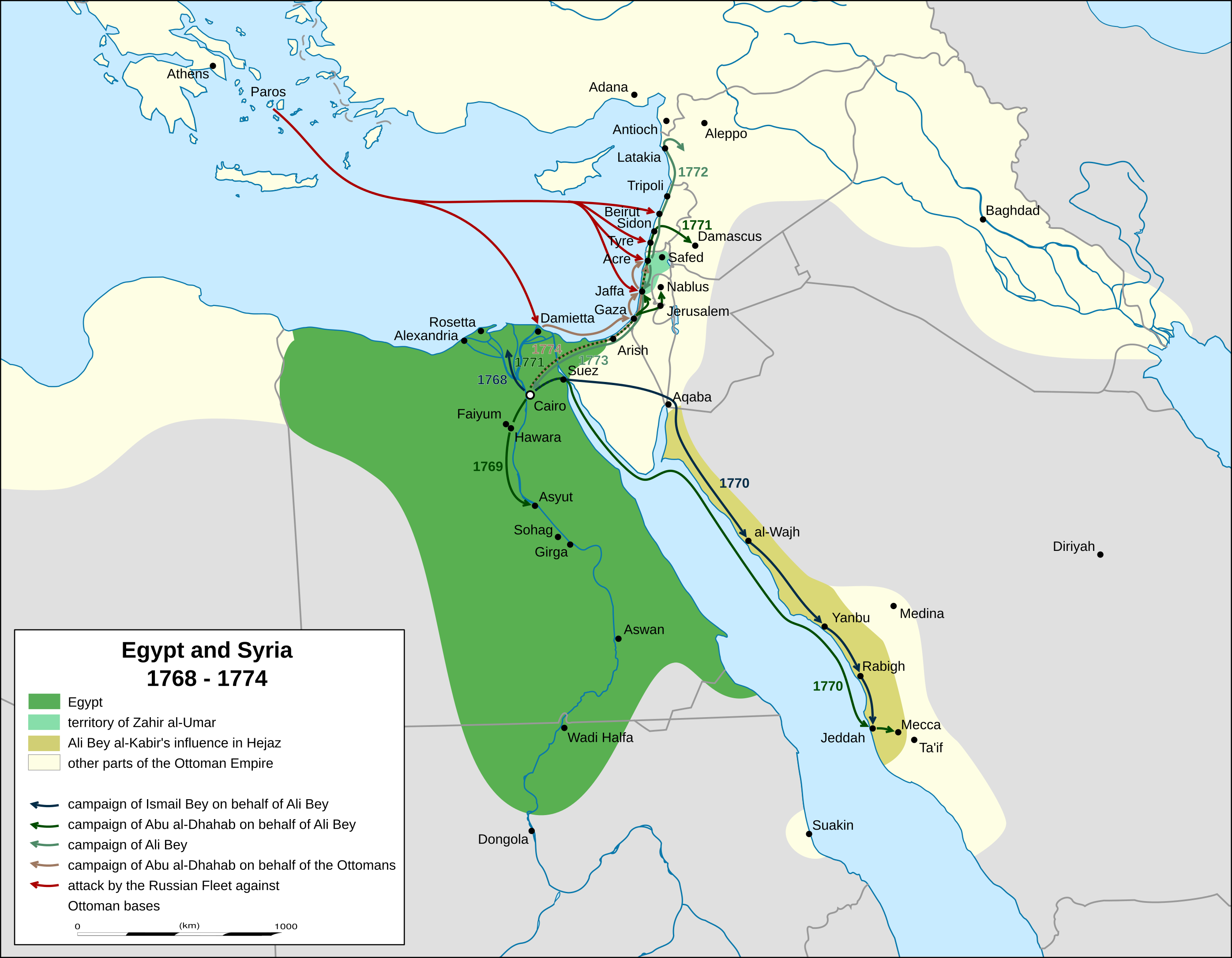
War in the Mideast: Russian fleet movements denoted by red arrows

In 1771, Ali Bey al-Kabir, the Mamluk usurper of Egypt, allied with Daher al-Umar, the autonomous sheikh of Acre, against the Ottoman overlords. The Egyptian general Abu al-Dhahab marched on Damascus, but the Ottoman governor, Uthman Pasha al-Kurji, convinced him to turn on his erstwhile master. Abu al-Dhahab then marched on Egypt and forced Ali Bey to flee to Daher. Count Orlov, with Catherine's approval, intervened and established friendly relations with the two anti-Ottoman rebels. The Russian fleet provided critical aid in the Battle of Sidon and it bombarded and occupied Beirut both in 1772 and in 1773. The Russians surrendered Beirut to the pro-Ottoman emir of Mount Lebanon, Yusuf Shihab, only after being paid a large ransom.

In 1773, Yusuf Shihab entrusted the strengthening of Beirut's defences to Ahmad al-Jazzar. When the latter began to act independently, Yusuf got into contact with Daher al-Umar to remove him. Daher suggested that they enlist the Russians. The Russian squadron, under Captain Ivan Kozhukov, blockaded and bombarded Beirut while Daher negotiated Jazzar's withdrawal. The latter then entered Daher's service, only to rebel against him after a few months. In consequence, the Russians occupied Beirut for a second time, for four months, to force Yusuf to pay a ransom.

== Mediation and ceasefire ==
Prussia, Austria, and Great Britain offered to mediate the dispute between Russia and the Ottomans to halt Russia's expansion. Austria managed to turn the situation to its advantage by gaining Bukovina District from the Ottomans with a treaty on July 6, 1771. The Austrians maintained their increased military presence on their border with Moldavia and Wallachia, and they increased a subsidy to the cash-starved Ottomans, who had been dabbling in tax farming) and offered unsubstantiated support to the Ottomans against Russia.

Catherine II, wary of the proximity of the Austrian army to her own forces and fearing an all-out European war, accepted the loss of Poland and agreed to Frederick II's plan to partition Poland. She secretly agreed to return the captured principalities back to the Ottomans, thereby removing Austria's fear of a powerful Russian Balkan neighbour. On April 8, 1772, Kaunitz, the Austrian equivalent of Minister of Foreign affairs, informed the Sublime Porte that Austria no longer considered the treaty of 1771 binding.

A ceasefire between Russia and the Ottoman Empire commenced on May 30, 1772, but real negotiations did not begin until August 8. The peace talks broke down almost immediately over the Crimea, but the truce was extended until March 20, 1773.

Both parties had reasons to expand the negotiations, primarily to do with both sides wanting to keep fighting on a single front. The Ottomans were now quelling rebellions from Egypt and Syria and also faced incursions from Persia. The Russians were facing a revival of a centralized Sweden, which had undergone a coup from King Gustav III.

== Final Russian offensive ==
On June 20, 1774, the Russian army, under the command of Alexander Suvorov, managed to rout the Ottoman army near Kozludzha. Russia used the victory to force the Ottoman Empire to acquiesce to Russia's preferences in the treaty.

== Peace treaty ==
On July 21, 1774, the Ottoman Empire had to sign perforce the Treaty of Küçük Kaynarca. The treaty did not overtly take away vast territories from the Ottomans – Poland had already paid the price of alienated territory. According to the treaty:

- The Crimean Khanate formally gained its independence from both powers (but in reality became dependent on Russia and in 1783 was directly annexed after bloody clashes between the Christian and Tatar populations).
- Russia received war reparations of 4.5 million rubles
- The Ottoman Empire ceded to Russia two key seaports, Azov and Kerch, allowing the Russian Navy and merchant fleet direct access to the Black Sea
- Russia gained the territory between the rivers Dnieper and Southern Bug
- The Porte renounced Ottoman claims to Kabardia in the North Caucasus beginning the Russo-Circassian war and subsequent genocide.
- Russia gained official status as protector of the Orthodox Christians living in the Ottoman Empire, which opened the door for future Russian expansion

As a consequence of the treaty, the Ottomans ceded the northwestern part of Moldavia (later known as Bukovina) to the Habsburg Empire.

Russia quickly exploited Küçük Kaynarca for an easy excuse to go to war and take more territory from the Ottoman Empire.

This war comprised but a small part of the continuous process of expansion of the Russian Empire southwards and westwards during the 18th and 19th centuries.

== See also ==
- Russo-Turkish wars
- Greek Plan
- Black Sea slave trade

== Sources ==
- Aksan, Virginia (1993). "The One-Eyed Fighting the Blind: Mobilization, Supply, and Command in the Russo-Turkish War of 1768–1774". International History Review. 15 (2): 221–238. doi:10.1080/07075332.1993.9640643.
- Aksan, Virginia (2002). "Breaking the spell of the Baron de Tott: reframing the question of military reform in the Ottoman Empire, 1760–1830". International History Review. 24 (2): 253–277. doi:10.1080/07075332.2002.9640964.
- De Madariaga, Isabel (1981). Russia in the Age of Catherine the Great. New Haven: Yale University Press. pp. 205–14. ISBN 0-300-02515-7.
- Mikaberidze, Alexander (2011). "Treaty of Kuchuk Kainardji (1774)". In Mikaberidze, Alexander (ed.). Conflict and Conquest in the Islamic World: A Historical Encyclopedia. Vol. 1. ABC-CLIO.
