= Henry Baillie (admiral) =

Russian naval officer (c. 1756 – 1826)

- Григорий Григорьевич Бе́лли; Генрих Григорьевич Белле
- Born: c. 1756
- Died: June 2, 1826 (aged 69–70); Mykolaiv
- Other names: Grigori Baillie; Genrikh Genrikhovich Belle; Grigory Grigorievich Belli (Note: In Russian, sometimes spelled as Belle or Belli.)
- Military career
- Allegiance: Russia; Scotland (prior to 1783)
- Branch: Imperial Russian Navy; Royal Navy (prior to 1783)
- Rank: Rear Admiral
- Conflicts: Russo-Turkish War (1787–1792); Battle of Fidonisi (1788); Battle of Tendra (1790); Battle of Kerch Strait (1790); Battle of Cape Kaliakra (1791); Mediterranean campaign (1798)
- Awards: Order of Saint Vladimir (4th); Order of Saint Anna (1st & 2nd); Order of Saint George (4th); Order of Saint John of Jerusalem

Henry Baillie (Russian: Григорий Григорьевич Бе́лли, romanized: Genrikh Genrikhovich Belle or Russian: Генрих Григорьевич Белле, romanized: Grigory Grigorievich Belli; c. 1756 – 2 June 1826) was a naval officer in the Imperial Russian Navy of Scottish origin. He reached his final rank of rear admiral in 1816 after fighting in the Russo-Turkish War (1787–1792), the Mediterranean campaign of 1798, efforts against the Parthenopean Republic (1798–1800) and the Second Archipelago Expedition (1805–1807).

He appeared as a character in the 1953 film Attack from the Sea, played by Vladimir Balachov.

== Life ==
=== Early service ===
He was transferred from the Royal Navy to the Imperial Russian Navy whilst still a midshipman in 1783 and assigned to the fleet on the Don River. He was promoted to lieutenant the following year and commanded the Elan from 1784 to 1787. During the Second Turkish War he commanded the schooner Pobedoslav Dunaisky, in the battle of Fidonisi (July 3, 1788).

In 1790, he was appointed commander of the training schooner Polotsk in Rear Admiral Fyodor Ushakov's squadron, with which he fought in the battles of the Kerch Strait (July 8, 1790), Tendra (August 28 and 29, 1790), and Cape Kaliakra (July 31, 1791). For his distinction in those three battles, Baillie was awarded the Order of Saint Vladimir, 4th class with a bow.

=== Mediterranean ===
Commanding the 32-gun frigate Schastlivy, Baillie took part in Ushakov's 1798–1800 expedition to capture the Ionian Islands from the French, including the capture of the islands of Cerigo and Zante and the siege of the fortress of Corfu, for which he was awarded the Order of Saint Anna, 2nd class.

Promoted to captain, 2nd rank, Baillie landed on the Italian coast in the Gulf of Manfredonia on May 8, 1799, with a detachment of 511 sailors and six cannons to attack supporters of the Parthenopean Republic. On May 11, he captured the city of Foggia and then proceeded by land directly to Naples, restoring royal authority all along his route. Receiving reinforcements for his detachment from Russian ships, Baillie drove out the French detachment in the fortress of Sant'Elmo, took part in the capture of Naples on June 3 and was the Russian signatory of the peace agreement.

For the capture of Foggia, Baillie was awarded the Order of St. John of Jerusalem, and for the capture of Naples, he was awarded the Order of Saint Anna, 1st Class. This was the only example of such a high award being bestowed upon a staff officer and upon making it Paul I said "Baillie wanted to surprise me, and I will surprise him".

Baillie continued to patrol with his frigate, capturing the fortresses of Castel Nuovo and Capua on July 17. He then returned to Naples and remained there for two years.

=== Second Archipelago expedition ===
In 1804, as a captain, 1st rank, in command of the Asia Baillie returned to the archipelago for the second time and cruised in the Mediterranean. Following the arrival of the Kronstadt squadron under the flag of Vice-Admiral Dmitry Senyavin in the archipelago, Baillie assisted in the clearing of the French from coastal areas of the Adriatic.

In 1806, Baillie captured the province of Kotor in Montenegro, the town and fortress of Korčula on March 30, and the island of Vis. He then participated in the blockade of the island of Patras and, taking command of the Sedel-Bahr (captured in the Battle of Athos) sailed it from Corfu to Trieste. He was awarded the Order of St. George, 4th Class, "for participating, as an officer, in 18 naval campaigns".

In 1808, with the rank of captain-commander, following the outbreak of war with Britain, Baillie was recalled to Russia and lived in Moscow, St. Petersburg, and Saratov until 1812. From 1812 to 1826, Baillie continued to serve in the Black Sea Fleet, primarily stationed in Sevastopol, initially commanding the 74-gun ship Asia and the 59th naval crew. Promoted to the rank of rear admiral in 1816, he was given command of the 3rd Brigade of the Black Sea Fleet and died in Mykolaiv.

== See also ==
- List of Russian admirals
- Attack from the Sea
