= List of Ottoman conquests, sieges and landings =

The following is a list of Ottoman sieges and landings from the late 1200s to World War I.

A map of the territorial expansion of the Ottoman Empire from 1307 to 1683.

Ottoman territories acquired between 1481 and 1683 (See: list of territories)

== The Ottoman Emirate (Mid-13th century - 1402) ==
Event	Date	Who	Result
Escaping the Mongol dominance, Ertugrul settled his tribe in West Anatolia	Unknown; mid-13th century	Ertugrul	Conquering of Malagina and Sogut
The Sakarya river became submerged after a series of floods, leaving the Byzantine province of Bithynia defenceless to raids	Possibly 1302	Osman	Conquest of a wide foothold of small towns
Conquest of the island of Kalolimnos (present day İmralı Island) and the beginning of Ottoman presence in the Sea of Marmara	1308	^	
Conquest of Mudanya by the Ottoman Emirate and the first Ottoman landings in Thrace, southeastern Europe	1321	^	Access to the Marmara sea with Mudanya
Taking advantage of the Byzantine civil war the Ottomans took their time to deplead the Byzantines of their supplies by a decade long siege	1317 - April 1326	Orhan and Osman	The conquering of Bursa and the first major city in Ottoman control
After an earthquake damaging the Byzantine fortifications Orhan seized the opportunity to create a foothold near the Dardanelles	1327	Orhan	Conquest of Lopadion (modern day Ulubat)
Emperor Andronikos III could not break Orhan's army which was stationened at Pelekanon, leading in Byzantine failure to protect the rest of the Bithynian province	1328 - 1337	^	Conquest of major cities Nikaia (1331) and Nikomedia (1337)
Conquest of the strategic port city and gulf of Gemlik on the Marmara Sea by the Ottoman Emirate	1333	^	
Using the base of Lopadion Orhan launched a series of attacks against the Turkish emirate of Karesi. Resulting in a reliable crossing point from Asia into Europe.	1345 - 1346	^	Conquest of the modern-day Balikesir and the Dardanelles.
Benefitting from the Byzantine civil wars, earthquakes and tactfully marrying into alliances Suleyman pasha, Orhan's son, would lead Ottoman troops onto European soil. Using the claim of their ally Kantakouzenos the Ottomans could raid and conquer, eventually leading to a strong foothold in Thrace.	1346 - 1361	Orhan and Suleiman pasha	Alliance with Kantakouzenos by marriage (1346), start of war against John V (1352), conquest of Gallipoli (March 1354) and conquest of Dimetoka (1359 or 1361)
Conquest of Üsküdar (formerly Scutari or Chrysopolis) and Kadıköy (formerly Chalcedon) on the Anatolian side of İstanbul, the Marmara Island.	1352		
Suleyman pasha, Orhan's son, would conquer the city of Ankara. Although it is unknown from whom and for how long the Ottomans were able to control the area.	1354	Suleiman pasha	Temporary control of the beylik surrounding Ankara.
Small Turkic beyliks in Anatolia succumbed to the power of the Ottomans; by political marriages and annexation.	1362 - 1376	Murad	Annexation of land up to the city of modern day Antalya (late 1360s) and conquest of Germiyan and Kutahya (1375-1376)
First Ottoman landings in Attica, Morea and the Adriatic Sea	1372		
First conquests and acquisitions in North Macedonia (Battle of Maritsa, Mrnjavčević lands)	1371 1373		
Conquest of Moravian Serbia (Battle of Dubravnica) Siege and conquest of Sofia Siege and conquest of Niš and Pirot (Battle of Pločnik) Siege and conquest of Thessaloniki and Macedonia (Greece)	1381 1385 1386 1387		
The biggest remaining rival in Anatolia was found in the Karamanids. To avenge the Ottomans from a previous raid the two regional powers landed in a war leading to a loss of Karaman authonomity.	1387	Murad	Vassalization of the Karamanid emirate; Ottomans being the most dominant regional power.
Conquest of southern Bosnia and Herzegovina (Battle of Bileća) Conquest of most of the southern Balkans (Battle of Kosovo) including northern Bulgaria and Wallachia	1388 1389		
Landings at Chios, Euboea, Attica, Morea	1390–1391		
Conquest of northern Albania and southern Montenegro	1392		
Landings at Morea	1394		
Ottoman blockade of Constantinople (1394–1402) begins Conquest of Wallachia (Battle of Rovine)	1394 1395		
Reconquest of northern Bulgaria (Battle of Nicopolis) Conquest of Albania	1396		
Conquest of several coastal settlements on the Aegean Sea coasts of Greece and of several Anatolian beyliks on the Black Sea coasts of Anatolia	1397		
Landings at Thessaly, Morea, Albania and Epirus			

== Civil war and recovery (1402–1451) ==
Event	Date	Result
Conquest against Mongols (Battle of Ankara)	1402	
Second Ottoman siege of Constantinople	1411	
First conquest of Kurvingrad Conquest of several islands in the Aegean Sea	1413 1415–1416	
Conquest of the strategic port of Samsun in the Black Sea	1417	
Third Ottoman siege of Constantinople	1422	
Reconquest of Albania, conquests of several coastal settlements in Morea	1423	
Ottoman-Venetian War	1423–1430	
Conquest of the strategic port of Sinop (Sinope) in the Black Sea	1424	
Conquest of Smyrna from the Anatolian Beylik of that city	1426	
Reconquest of Thessalonica	1422–1430	
Conquest of Ioannina	1430	
First siege of Belgrade First siege and conquest of Novo Brdo (Novo Brdo Fortress) Attempted reconquest of Albania (see Siege of Krujë (1450))	1440 1441-1444 1448–1450	
Conquest of Arta, in Epirus Second conquest of Kurvingrad	1449 1451	

== Growth (1453–1550) ==
Event	Date	Result
Conquest of Constantinople (İstanbul), Imbros (currently Gökçeada), Lemnos and Thasos	1453	
Landings at the Dodecanese Islands Second Conquest of Novo Brdo (Novo Brdo Fortress) Second siege of Belgrade (Siege of Belgrade (1456))	1454 1455 1456	
Conquest of Despotate of the Morea, Serbian Despotate and the Duchy of Athens	1458 1459 1460	
Conquest of the Empire of Trebizond and the Genoese colony of Amasra	1461	
Conquest of the Genoese islands in the northern Aegean Sea, including Lesbos	1462	
Conquest of Kingdom of Bosnia and the castle of Riniassa and its dependent region of Preveza	1463	
Ottoman-Venetian War	1463–1479	
Conquest of castles and forts in Albania and failed sieges of Krujë (see Siege of Krujë (1466) and Siege of Krujë (1467))	1466	
Siege of Negroponte (1470)	1470	
Siege of Shkodër	1474	
Conquest of Crimea	1475	
Conquest of Venetian forts in Albania and second siege of Shkodra	1477 1478	
Landings at Lepanto in Greece and Veneto in Italy	1477 1478	
Conquest of Vonitsa, Lefkas, Cephalonia, and Zante	1463	
First siege and capture of Otranto	1480	
First siege of Rhodes Conquest of Herzegovina	1480 1481 1482	
Ottoman conquest of Kilia (Kiliya) and Akkerman(Bilhorod-Dnistrovskyi)	1484	
Landings at the Balearic Islands, Corsica and Pisa	1487 1490	
Landings at Elche, Almeria, Málaga	1490 1495	
Landings at the Gulf of Taranto	1496	
Conquest of Montenegro (Zeta under the Crnojevići)	1496 1499	
Ottoman-Venetian Wars	1499 1503	
Battle of Zonchio	1499	
Landings at Corfu	1500	
Capture of the Isle of Pianosa	1501	
Capture of several towns in Sardinia	1501	
Landings at Piombino	1501	
Landings at the Balearic Islands and Andalusia	1501	
Reconquest of Morea	1503	
Landings at Rhodes, Calabria, Sicily and Andalusia	1505	
Landings at Sicily	1506	
Landings at Liguria	1508 1509	
Landings at Capo Passero in Sicily	1510	
Landings at Bougie, Oran and Algiers	1510	
Landings at Reggio Calabria	1511	
Conquest of Moldavia	1512	
Landings at Andalusia and Minorca	1512	
Landings at Alicante, Malaga, Cherchell	1513 1514	
Capture of Jijel in Algeria and Mahdiya in Tunisia	1514	
Bombardment of Bougie, landings at Ceuta, Balearic Islands, Sardinia, Sicily	1514	
Conquest of Syria	1516	
Conquest of Algeria from Spain	1516 1517	
Landings at Elba and Liguria	1516	
Conquest of Palestine	1516	
Conquest of Egypt and the end of the Mameluke Empire	1517	
Landings at Provence, Toulon and the Îles d'Hyères in France	1519	
Third siege and conquest of Belgrade (Siege of Belgrade (1521)) Landings at the Balearic Islands	1521	
Siege of Knin	1522	
Conquest of Rhodes from the Knights of St. John, who relocate their base first to Sicily and later to Malta	1522	
Landings at Sardinia	1525	
Capture of Capo Passero in Sicily	1526	
Landings at Crotone, Reggio Calabria, Castignano, Capo Spartivento, Messina, Tuscany, Campania	1526	
Conquest of Dalmatia, Croatia, Slavonia and Bosnia	1527	
Landings at Italian and Spanish coastal towns	1527	
Ottoman-Spanish War near the Isle of Formentera	1529	
Capture of the Isle of Peñón	1529	
Landings at Andalusia	1529	
Capture of the Isle of Cabrera	1530	
Landings at Sicily, the Balearic Islands, Marseilles, Provence, Liguria, Sardinia, Piombino	1530	
Landings at the Isle of Favignana, Calabria, Puglia, Tripoli, Spain	1531	
Landings at Sardinia, Bonifacio, Montecristo, Elba, Lampedusa, Messina, Calabria	1532	
First conquest of Tunisia from Spain, reconquest of Morea	1534	
Capture of San Lucido, Cetraro, Capri, Procida, Tunis	1534	
Landings at Reggio Calabria, Gaeta, Villa Santa Lucia, Sant'Isidoro, Sperlonga, Fondi, Terracina, Ostia, Ponza, Sicily, Sardinia, bombardment of the ports at the Gulf of Naples	1534	
Recapture of Capri	1535	
Landings at Spain, the Balearic Islands, Tlemcen	1535	
Siege of Klis	1537	
Conquest of the Duchy of Naxos, Syros, Aegina, Ios, Paros, Tinos, Karpathos, Kasos	1537	
Second siege and capture of Otranto, Castro, Ugento	1537	
Landings at Calabria and Corfu	1537	
Battle of Preveza	1538	
Conquest of Castelnuovo (Herceg Novi) in Dalmatia	1538	
Conquest of Aden and Yemen from the Portuguese, Jeddah and Hijaz in Arabia	1538 1539	
Capture of Diu in India	1538	
Capture of the Gulf of Preveza, Isle of Lefkada, eastern Adriatic and Aegean islands belonging to the Republic of Venice, Candia in Crete	1538	
Ottoman-Portuguese Wars in the Indian Ocean	1538 1566	
Landings at Crete in Greece and Gujarat in India	1538	
Conquest of Risan, Skiathos, Skyros, Andros and Serifos	1539	
Reconquest of Castelnuovo	1539	
Landings at Cattaro and Pesaro, Corfu, Crete	1539	
Capture of Gozo, Pantelleria, Capraia, conquest of Serbia	1540	
Landings at Sicily, Corsica, Spain	1540	
Defeat of the Spanish-Italian fleet in Algiers	1541	
Capture of Esztergom, Hungary	1543	
Capture of Reggio Calabria, Messina, Nice, Antibes, Île Sainte-Marguerite, Monaco, San Remo, La Turbie	1543	
Landings at Campania, Lazio, venturing into the Tiber River near Rome	1543	
Defeat of the Spanish-Italian fleet in the Tyrrhenian Sea, assault on the Kingdom of Naples	1544	
Capture of Bonifacio in Corsica, Castiglione della Pescaia, Talamone, Orbetello, Grosseto, Montiano, Porto Ercole, Isle of Giglio, Ischia, Forio, and the Isle of Procida	1544	
Landings at San Remo, Borghetto Santo Spirito, Ceriale, Vado Ligure, Piombino, Civitavecchia, Sardinia, Gozo, Pozzuoli, Capo Palinuro, Catona, Fiumara, Calanna, Cariati, Lipari	1544	
Capture of Capraia, Monterosso, Corniglia, Rapallo, Pegli, Levanto	1545	
Landings at Spain, the Balearic Islands, Sicily, Liguria, Menarola, Riomaggiore, La Spezia	1545	
Capture of Mahdiya, Sfax, Sousse, Al Munastir in Tunisia; Laigueglia and Andora in Liguria; Gozo in Malta	1546	
Landings at Liguria, San Lorenzo al Mare	1546	
Reconquest of Yemen from the Portuguese	1547 1548	
Recapture of Gozo in Malta	1547	
Landings at both islands of Malta, Sicily, Aeolian Islands, Salina Island, Puglia, Salve, Calabria, Corsica	1547	
Capture of Castellamare di Stabia, Pozzuoli and Procida at the Gulf of Naples	1548	
Landings at Rapallo, San Fruttuoso, Portofino, San Remo, Corsica, Calabria	1549	
Recapture of Mahdiya, Sousse, Al Munastir in Tunisia, Rapallo in Liguria	1550	
Landings at Sardinia, Spain, Corsica, Gozo, Liguria, Mahdiya, Tunis, Djerba	1550	

== Transformation (1550-1700) ==
Event	Date	Result
Raid on Gozo, capture of Taggia and Riva Brigoso in Liguria	1551	
Siege of Tripoli (Conquest of Libya from Spain and Malta)	1551	
Landings at the Adriatic ports, Sicily	1551	
Defeat of the Spanish-Italian fleet near Ponza	1552	
Conquest of Oman, Hormuz and Qatar from the Portuguese	1552	
Capture of Pantelleria, Ponza, Massa Lubrense, Sorrento, Pozzuoli, Minturno, Nola	1552	
Landings at Augusta and Licata in Sicily, Taormina, Gulf of Policastro, Palmi, Gulf of Naples, Sardinia, Corsica, Lazio	1552	
Capture of Crotone and Castello in Calabria; Marciana Marina, Rio and Capoliveri in Elba. Invasion of Corsica (Capture of Bonifacio, Bastia and Calvi). Recapture of Pianosa and Capri.	1553	
Landings at Sicily, Tavolara, Sardinia, Porto Ercole, Piombino, Portoferraio	1553	
Capture of Vieste near Foggia; Elba and Corsica	1554	
Landings at Dalmatia, Dubrovnik, Orbetello and Tuscany	1554	
Defeat of the Spanish-Italian fleet near Piombino	1555	
Capture of Paola and Santo Noceto in Calabria, Papulonia in Elba; Bastia in Corsica; Ospedaletti in Liguria	1555	
Landings at Capo Vaticano, Ceramica, San Lucido in Calabria; Piombino in Elba; Calvi in Corsica; Sardinia; San Remo and Liguria	1555	
Capture of Bergeggi and San Lorenzo in Liguria; Gafsa in Tunisia	1556	
Landings at Lampedusa	1556	
Capture of Cariati in Calabria	1557	
Landings at the Gulf of Taranto and Puglia	1557	
Capture of Gharyan, Misratah, Tagiora, Djerba, Reggio Calabria, Aeolian Islands, Massa Lubrense, Cantone, Sorrento, Minorca	1558	
Landings at the Strait of Messina, Amalfi, Gulf of Salerno, Torre del Greco, Tuscany, Piombino, Spain	1558	
Battle of Djerba	1560	
Landings at Stromboli, Gozo, Gulf of Naples	1561	
Siege of Oran	1562	
Capture of Granada in Spain; Naples in Italy and the fortresses around the city, Chiaia	1563	
Landings at Malaga, another siege on Spanish-controlled Oran and Mers-el-Kebir; landings at Liguria, Sardinia, Oristano, Marcellino, Ercolento, Puglia, Abruzzo, San Giovanni near Messina, Capo Passero in Sicily, Gozo in Malta	1563	
Ottoman expedition to Aceh (Annexation of Aceh in Sumatra, Indonesia, upon request by Sultan Alaaddin of Aceh who declares allegiance to the Ottoman Empire and asks for protection against Portuguese aggression)	1565	
Siege of Malta (including capture of Fort Saint Elmo and the Bastion of Castille on Fort Saint Michael)	1565	
Siege of Szigetvár	1566	
Conquest of Chios and the end of Genoese presence in the Aegean	1566	
Landings at Puglia	1566	
First Ottoman naval forces are stationed on Aceh in Sumatra, Indonesia	1569	
Landings at Sumatra in Indonesia	1569	
Battle of Gozo	1570	
Conquest of Cyprus from the Republic of Venice, sieges of Nicosia and Famagusta	1570–1571	
Reconquest of Dalmatia from the Republic of Venice	1571	
Landings at Corfu	1571	
Battle of Lepanto	1571	
Landings at Puglia and Corfu	1573	
Reconquest of Tunisia from Spain	1574	
Conquest of Fezzan, and a significant part of the Southern Sahara	1574	
capture of Fez and Marrakech	1576	
Landings at Calabria	1576	
Defeat of the Portuguese fleet off the coast of Morocco	1578	
Capture of Georgia and Dagestan	1578	
Capture of Lanzarote of the Canary Islands in the Atlantic Ocean	1585	
Recapture of Esztergom, Hungary	1605	
Defeat of the French-Maltese fleet in the Levant	1609	
Landings at Malta and southern Morea	1614	
Landings at the shoreline between Cadiz and Lisbon	1616	
Capture of Madeira in the Atlantic Ocean	1617	
Landings at Sussex, Plymouth 27 ships were taken away from its port), Devon, Hartland Point, Cornwall and the other counties of western England in August	1625	
Capture of the Isle of Lundy in the Bristol Channel. Lundy becomes the main base of the Ottoman marine operations in the Atlantic Ocean for the next 5 years	1627	
Capture of Vestmannaeyjar near Iceland	1627	
Landings in the Northern Atlantic including the British Isles, Shetland Islands, Faroe Islands, Denmark, Sweden, Norway, Iceland, Labrador, Gulf of Saint Lawrence, Newfoundland and Virginia	1627 1660	
Landings at Denmark, Norway and Iceland	1627	
Landings at England, Ireland, Denmark and Iceland	1631	
Capture of County Cork, Sack of Baltimore in Ireland	1631	
Reconquest of Azov from the Russians	1642	
Start of the Cretan War: Conquest of Chania in Crete	1645	
Conquest of Chisamo and Souda in Crete	1646	
Siege of Candia (Heraklion) in Crete begins	1648	
Landings at England, Iceland, Norway, Sweden and Denmark	1655 1660	
Final stage of the Siege of Candia, ends with capture of city. End of the Cretan war.	1666–1669	
Sieges of Chyhyryn in Ukraine	1677-1678	
Conquest of the castles controlling the Black Sea entrance of the Dnieper River	1679	
Reconquest of Chios during the Seventh Ottoman–Venetian War (1684–1699)	1695	

== Stagnation (1700–1827) ==
Event	Date	Result
Recapture of Preveza	1701	
Ottoman invasion of western Georgia	1703	Conquest of Batumi, Poti, and Anaklia
Conquest of Oran, the final Spanish stronghold in Algeria	1708	
Reconquest of Moldavia and Azov from the Russians	1711	
Start of the Eighth Ottoman-Venetian War with the reconquest of Morea	1715	
Conquest of Souda in Crete and the island of Tinos in the Cyclades	1715	
Unsuccessful siege of Corfu	1716	
Turkish-Russian War	1738	
Landings at the entrance of the Dniester River and northern Crimea	1769	
Reconquest of Morea and Lemnos after the Orlov Revolt	1770	
Battle of Chios followed by Battle of Chesme	1770	
Failed landing at Kerch against Russian navy	1774	
Failed landing at Kinburn against Russian army	1787	
Defeat by Russian fleet near Yılan Island and naval skirmishes around Ochakov	1788	
Battles with Russian fleet at Tendra and Kerch	1791	
Battle with Russian fleet off Cape Kaliakra	1791	
Capture of Corfu from the French by joint Russian-Ottoman fleet	1799	Creation of Septinsular Republic
Reconquest of Egypt	1801	
Defense of Dardanelles against British and Russians	1807	
Battle of Athos	1807	
Reconquest of Medina, Mecca and Hijaz in Arabia	1812 1813	
Greek Revolution begins	1821	
Recapture of Chios from the Greek rebels and massacre of the population	1822	
First Siege of Missolonghi	1822	
Recapture of the island of Psara from the Greek rebels and massacre of its population	1824	
Third Siege of Missolonghi	1825–1826	
Battle of Navarino	1827	
Battle of Sinope	1854	
Defeat of the Russian forces in the Crimean War, led by France, the United Kingdom and the Kingdom of Sardinia	1854 1856	
Reconquest of the islands controlling the Black Sea entrance of the Danube River	1857	
Reconquest of Montenegro and Shkodër	1862	

== Dissolution (1908–1922) ==
Event	Date	Result
Battle of Gallipoli	1915–1916	Ottoman victory and saving of the capital Constantinople from invasion
Turkish War of Independence	1919–1923	Turkish Nationalist victory; the abolition of the Ottoman sultanate (1922) and the formation of the Republic of Turkey (1923)

== See also ==
- Ottoman wars in Europe
- List of cities conquered by the Ottoman Empire
- List of battles involving the Ottoman Empire
- List of Ottoman Empire territories
- Ottoman Navy
- Barbary pirates
- Ottoman–Portuguese conflicts (1538–1559)
- To see more and get source

== References and sources ==
- The Ottomans: Comprehensive and detailed online chronology of Ottoman history in English.
- Tarih Bilgi Bankası: Online history database in Turkish.
- Tarihte Bugün: Online history database in Turkish.
- E. Hamilton Currey, Sea-Wolves of the Mediterranean, London, 1910
- Bono, Salvatore: Corsari nel Mediterraneo (Corsairs in the Mediterranean), Oscar Storia Mondadori. Perugia, 1993.
- Melis, Nicola, "The importance of Hormuz for Luso-Ottoman Gulf-centred policies in the 16th century: Some observations based on contemporary sources", in R. Loureiro-D. Couto (eds.), Revisiting Hormuz – Portuguese Interactions in the Persian Gulf Region in the Early Modern Period, "Maritime Asia" 19, Fundação Calouste Gulbenkian/Harrassowitz Verlag, Wiesbaden 2008, pp. 107–120.
- Corsari nel Mediterraneo: Condottieri di ventura. Online database in Italian, based on Salvatore Bono's book.
- Turkish Navy official website: Historic heritage of the Turkish Navy (in Turkish)
- Turkish Navy official website: Turkish seamen in the Atlantic Ocean (in Turkish)
- Bradford, Ernle, The Sultan's Admiral: The life of Barbarossa, London, 1968.
- Wolf, John B., The Barbary Coast: Algeria under the Turks, New York, 1979; ISBN 0-393-01205-0
