= Temnikovsky =

Temnikovsky (masculine), Temnikovskaya (feminine), or Temnikovskoye (neuter) may refer to:

- Temnikovsky District, a district of the Republic of Mordovia, Russia
- Temnikovskoye Urban Settlement, a municipal formation which the town of district significance of Temnikov in Temnikovsky District of the Republic of Mordovia, Russia is incorporated as
- Temnikovsky ITL, or Temlag, one of the Soviet GULAG labor camps
