= Fyodor Ushakov =

Russian saint and admiral

- Фёдор Фёдорович Ушаков
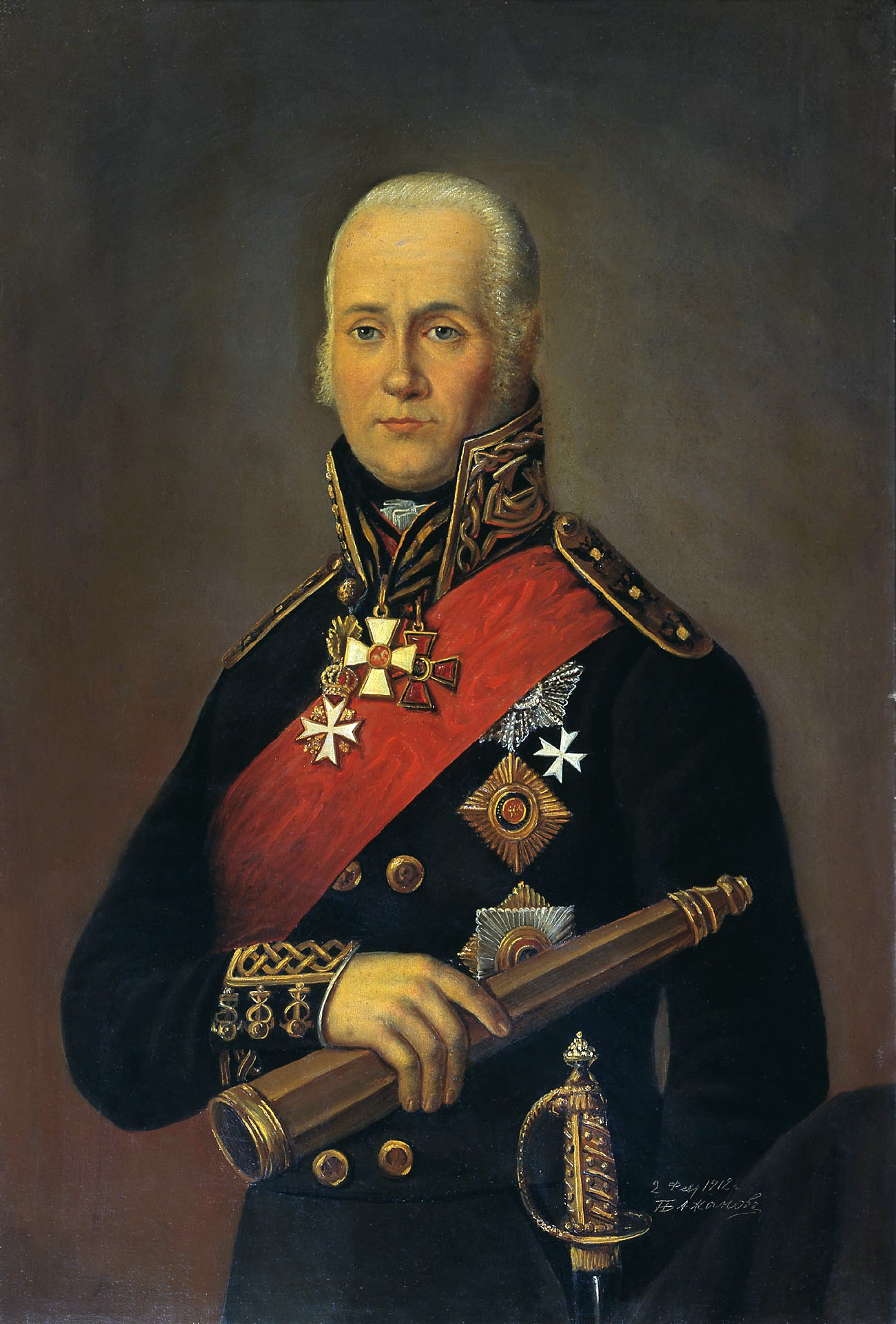
- Portrait by Peter Bajanov, 1912
- Born: 24 February 1745; Burnakovo, Moscow Governorate, Russian Empire
- Died: 14 October 1817 (aged 72); Alekseevka, Tambov Governorate, Russian Empire
- Burial place: Sanaksar Monastery, Temnikov
- Relatives: House of Ushakov
- Military career
- Allegiance: Russia
- Branch: Imperial Russian Navy
- Service years: 1766–1812
- Rank: Admiral
- Nickname: Ushak Pasha
- Commands: Black Sea Fleet
- Conflicts: Russo-Turkish War (1768–1774); Russo-Turkish War (1787–1792); Battle of Fidonisi; Battle of Kerch; Battle of Tendra; Battle of Cape Kaliakra; War of the Second Coalition; Mediterranean campaign; Siege of Corfu (1798–1799)
- Awards: (Russian Empire) Order of Saint Vladimir 2nd Class (1790); (Russian Empire) Order of Saint George 2nd Class (1790); (Russian Empire) Order of Saint Alexander Nevsky (1792); (Russian Empire) Order of Saint John of Jerusalem (1798); (Ottoman Empire) Chelengk (1799); (Kingdom of Naples) Order of Saint Januarius (1799); Golden Weapon (Septinsular Republic)

Saint Fyodor (Theodore) Ushakov
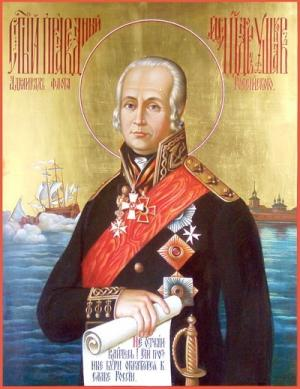
- Russian icon of Theodore Ushakov

Holy Righteous Warrior
- Venerated in: Russian Orthodox Church
- Canonized: 7 August 2001, Sanaksar Monastery, Temnikov, Russia by Russian Orthodox Church
- Major shrine: Cathedral of St. Theodore Ushakov, Saransk, Mordovia; Sanaksar Monastery, Temnikov, Russia
- Feast: 2 October 23 July, 23 May
- Attributes: Admiral attire Telescope; Scroll; Medals
- Patronage: Russian Navy; Nuclear bombers

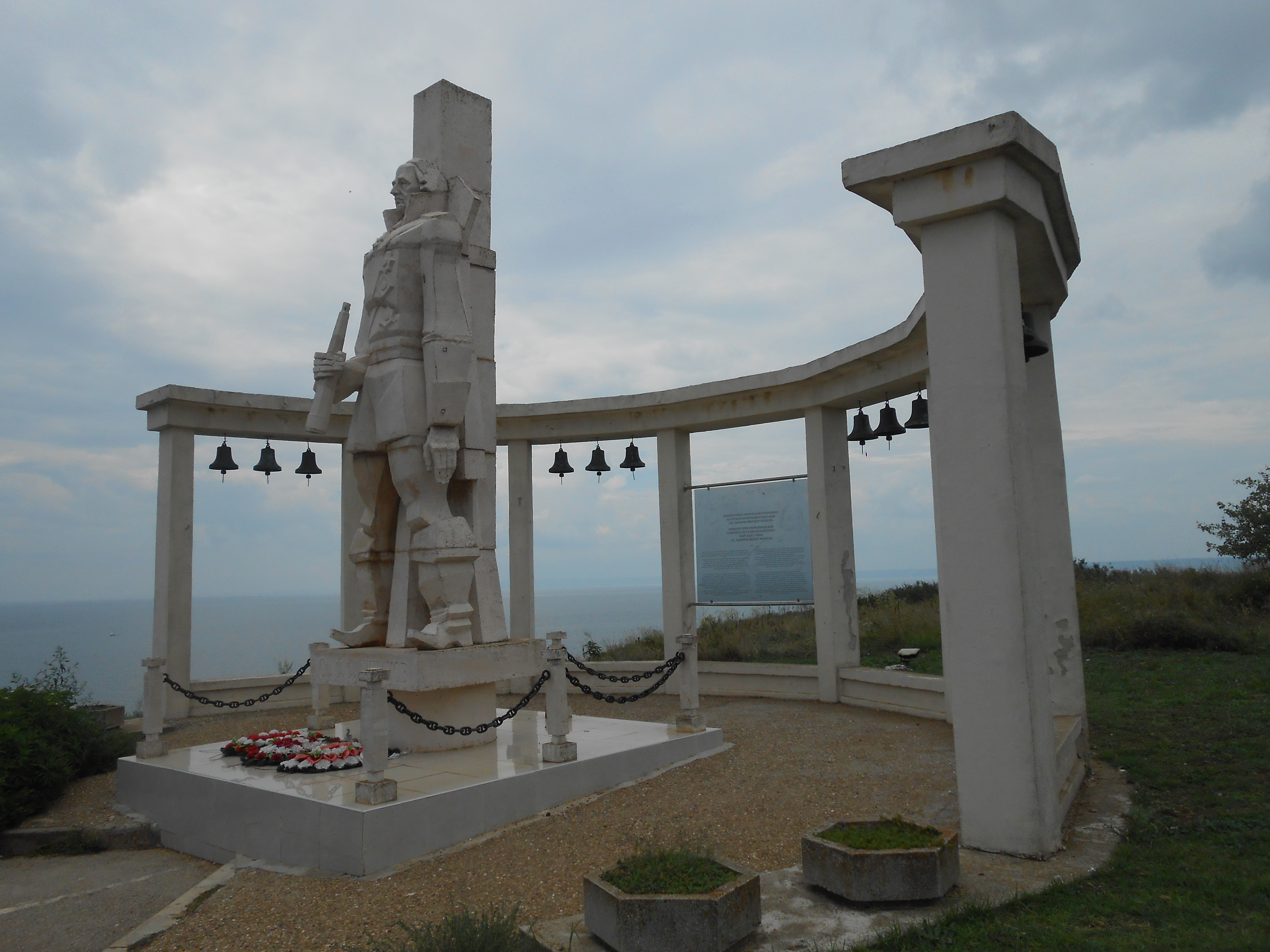
Monument to Admiral Fyodor Ushakov for the battle of Cape Kaliakra, Kaliakra, Kavarna

Admiral Fyodor Fyodorovich Ushakov (Russian: Фёдор Фёдорович Ушаков, romanized: Fyodor Fyodorovich Ushakov, IPA: [ʊʂɐˈkof]; 24 February [O.S. 13 February] 1745 – 14 October [O.S. 2 October] 1817) was an Imperial Russian Navy officer best known for his service in the French Revolutionary and Napoleonic Wars. He won every engagement he participated in as the admiral of the Russian fleet.

== Life and naval career ==
Ushakov was born in the village of Burnakovo in the Yaroslavl province, Moscow Gubernia, to a modest family of the minor nobility. His father, Fyodor Ignatyevich Ushakov, was a retired sergeant of the Preobrazhensky Regiment of the Russian Imperial guards. By the time Fyodor Ushakov submitted his statement of background (skaska) to the military, his family had not been officially confirmed in the so-called 'dvoryanstvo', yet they surely belonged to serving gentry. In the submission Ushakov stated that he neither had a coat-of-arms, nor a royal patent for a landed estate, and had no way to prove nobility. In 1798, Ushakov, as a vice-admiral of the Black Sea Fleet, submitted a request for official nobility and an arms providing a genealogical record. In 1807 his coat-of-arms was added to the General all-Russian book heraldry. In 1815 Fyodor Ushakov and his family were added to the part 6 (ancient nobility) of the Yaroslavl genealogical book.

On 15 February 1761, he signed up for the Imperial Russian Navy in Saint Petersburg. After training, he served on a galley in the Baltic Fleet. In 1768 he was transferred to the Don Flotilla (Azov Flotilla) in Taganrog, and served in the Russo-Turkish War (1768–74). He commanded Catherine II's own yacht, and was active in protecting Russian merchant ships in the Mediterranean during the First League of Armed Neutrality.

After the Russian Empire conquered the Crimean Khanate in 1783, Ushakov personally supervised the construction of a naval base in Sevastopol and the building of docks in Kherson. During the Russo-Turkish War (1787–92), he defeated the Ottomans at Fidonisi under Marko Voinovich's leadership (1788), the Kerch Strait (1790), Tendra (1790), and Cape Kaliakra (1791). In these battles, he demonstrated the ingenuity of his innovative doctrines in the art of naval warfare.

In 1798 Ushakov was promoted to full admiral and given command of a squadron which sailed to the Mediterranean via Constantinople, where it joined with an Ottoman squadron. The combined Russian-Ottoman fleet then operated under Ushakov's command in the War of the Second Coalition against the French Republic. The expedition started by conquering the Ionian islands, acquired by France the year before from the defunct Republic of Venice in the Treaty of Campo Formio. This action culminated in the siege of Corfu, and led to the subsequent creation of the Septinsular Republic. In establishing this republic, Ushakov proved himself to be a skilful politician and diplomat. Ushakov's squadron then blockaded French bases in Italy, notably Genoa and Ancona, and successfully assaulted Naples (Henry Baillie's landing party of 600 men) and Rome (the detachments of Pyotr Balabin and Colonel Skipor, 800 men). The Italians greeted the Russians as liberators: according to Balabin's report, with the words Vivat Pavlo primo, vivat moscovito! The capture of Naples and Rome became possible for Russia because the local French were forced to engage the Coalition at the Trebbia. Shortly after the capture of Rome, the Russian detachments returned to the squadron. Ferdinand IV asked Ushakov at the very end of 1799, during the departure of the Russian squadron, to leave Baillie and his party in Naples for some time.

Tsar Paul, in his capacity as the Grand Master of the Order of St. John, ordered Ushakov to proceed to Malta, which a British fleet under Nelson was assisting in besieging.

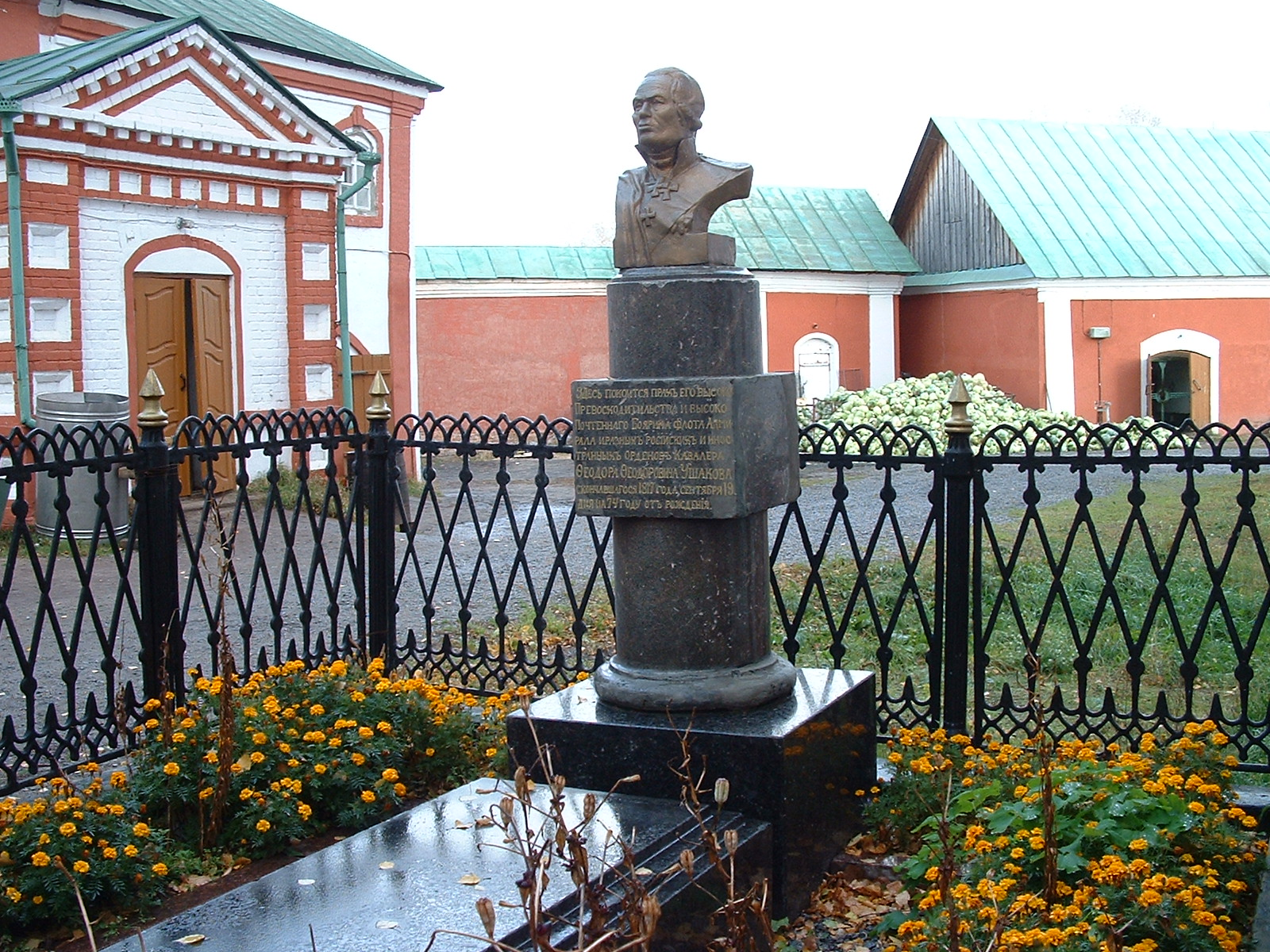
Grave of Ushakov in Sanaksar Abbey

However, after rendezvousing with the Coalition forces on Malta, Ushakov was almost immediately recalled back home to Russia in 1800 (along with his fleet), where the new Emperor, Alexander I, failed to appreciate his victories. Ushakov resigned command in 1807 and withdrew into the Sanaksar Monastery in modern-day Mordovia. He was asked to command the local militia during the Patriotic War of 1812. He declined due to ill-health, but donated his savings.

In the course of 43 naval battles under his command he did not lose a single ship and never lost a battle.

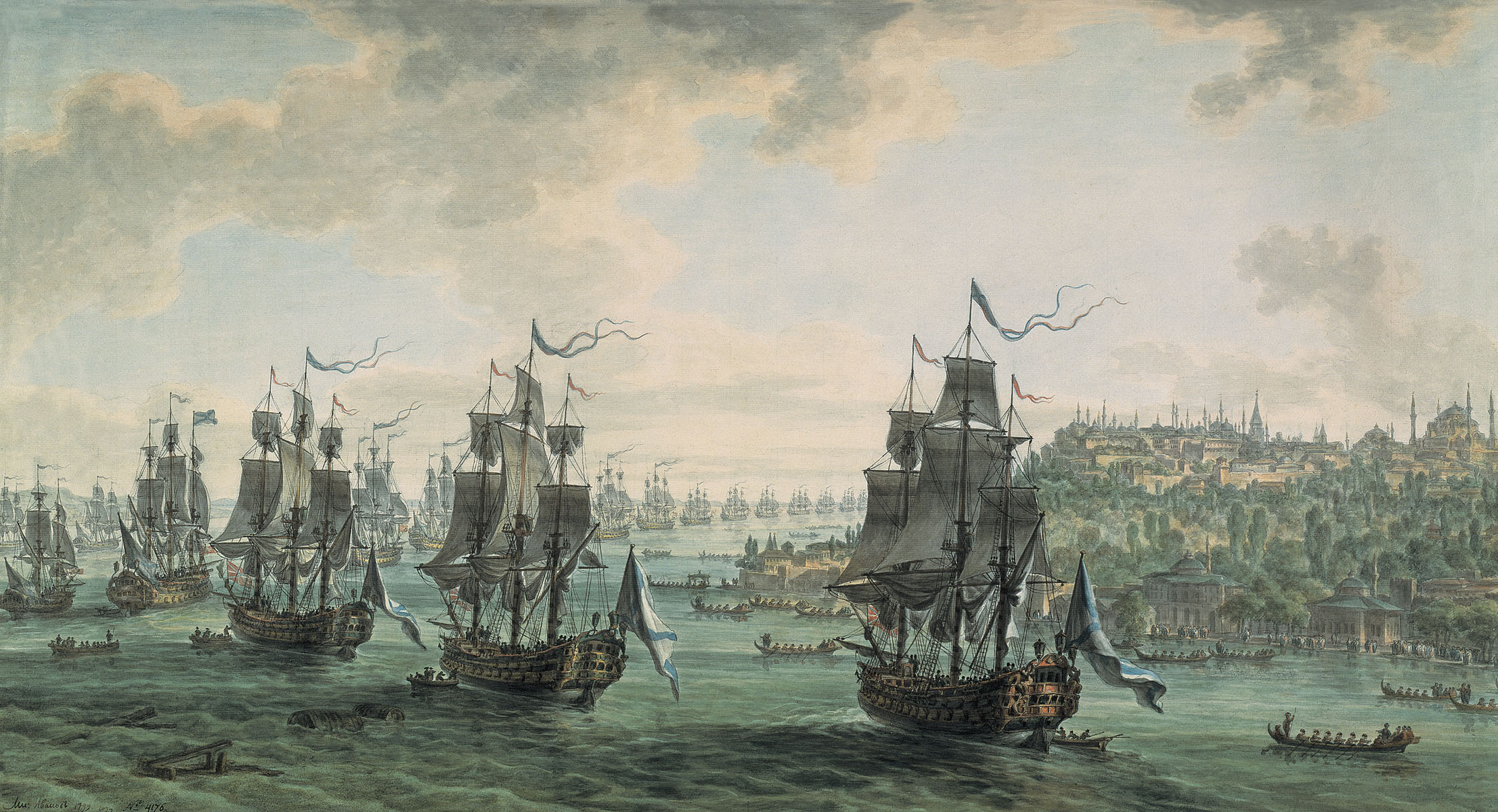
Russian squadron under the command of Vice-Admiral F. F. Ushakov, sailing through the strait of Constantinople on 8 September 1798. Painting by M. M. Ivanov (1799). Russian Museum

== Tactics ==
Distinguishing features of Ushakov's tactics were: use of unified marching and fighting orders; resolute closing to close quarters with the enemy forces without evolution of a fighting order; concentration of effort against enemy flagships; maintaining a reserve (Kaiser-flag squadrons); combination of aimed artillery fire and maneuvering; and chasing the enemy to its total destruction or capture.

Giving great value to sea and fire training of his staff, Ushakov was a supporter of generalissimo Suvorov's principles of training for sailors and officers. Ushakov's innovations were among the first successful developments of naval tactics, from its "line" to maneuvering concepts.

== Legacy ==
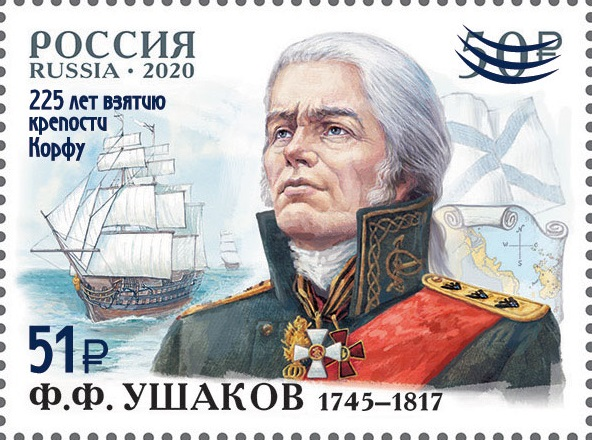
Ushakov on a 2024 stamp of Russia

Several warships have been named after Admiral Ushakov.

On 3 March 1944 the Presidium of the Supreme Soviet of the USSR established the Order of Ushakov for Navy officers who showed outstanding achievement leading to victory over a numerically superior enemy. This medal was one of several which was preserved in Russia upon the dissolution of the Soviet Union, thus remaining one of the highest military awards in the Russian Federation. The Ushakov Medal was established simultaneously for servicemen who had risked their life in naval theatres defending the Soviet Union. In May 2014, the medal was presented to 19 surviving British sailors who had served on the Arctic convoys during World War II in a ceremony aboard HMS Belfast.

The Ushakov Baltic Higher Naval School in Kaliningrad also carries his name. The minor planet 3010 Ushakov, discovered by Soviet astronomer Lyudmila Ivanovna Chernykh in 1978, is named after him.

In 1953 two Soviet films were released portraying his career: Attack from the Sea and Admiral Ushakov. In both films he was played by Ivan Pereverzev.

A bust of Admiral Ushakov was set up in 2013 in Messina, Italy to commemorate Russian efforts to help survivors of the 1908 Messina earthquake.

Ushakov is one of the eight patrons depicted in the Cathedral of the Resurrection of Christ at Patriot Park, Moscow.

== Veneration ==
On 7 August 2001 the Russian Orthodox Church glorified Ushakov as a Saint and declared him the patron of the Russian Navy. His relics are enshrined in Sanaksar Monastery, Temnikov, Russia.

In 2005, in the Cathedral of St. Theodore Ushakov in Saransk (Mordovia), Patriarch Alexius II declared Saint Feodor (Theodore) Ushakov the patron saint of Russian nuclear-armed strategic bombers.

His feast days are 2 October (day of death), 23 July (glorification) and 23 May (saints of Yaroslavl and Rostov).

== Sources ==
Bibliography:

- "УШАКОВ ФЁДОР ФЁДОРОВИЧ • Great Russian Encyclopedia – Electronic version". old.bigenc.ru. 2023.
