= Dmitri Proshin =

Dmitri Proshin may refer to:

- Dmitri Proshin (footballer, born 1974), Russian footballer with FC Torpedo Vladimir
- Dmitri Proshin (footballer, born 1984), Russian footballer with FC Pskov-747 Pskov
