= List of cities conquered by the Ottoman Empire =

The list of major cities conquered by the Ottoman Empire is below. Since it is impossible to include all cities, only the most populous cities, capitals and the cities with strategical or historical importance are shown.

== Cities ==
This following list, the first column shows the year of the conquest. (Note: Not all cities were conquered by military force. Some were included within Ottoman realm voluntarily.) Some of the cities (like Tabriz, Yerevan or Belgrade) had been conquered more than once. In this case, only the first conquest has been shown. The second column shows the name of the city (where necessary, the Ottoman Turkish name and/or the contemporary Turkish name has also been given in parathesis), the third column shows the holder before conquest and the fourth column shows the present country. In the fifth column links to the article in this encyclopedia for the details of the conquest (where applicable).

Year	Name	Holder before the Conquest	Present country	Battle/Siege	Statute
1326	Prusa (Bursa)	Byzantine Empire	Turkey	Siege of Bursa	
1331	Nicaea (İznik)	Byzantine Empire	Turkey	Siege of Nicaea	
1338	Nicomedia (İzmit)	Byzantine Empire	Turkey		
1352	Callipolis (Gelibolu)	Byzantine Empire	Turkey		
1356	Ankara	Ahis (Ankara ahileri)	Turkey		
1361	Adrianopol (Edirne)	Byzantine Empire	Turkey		
1364	Plovdiv (Filibe)	Bulgarian Empire	Bulgaria	Capture of Plovdiv	
1364	Stara Zagora (Eski Zagra)	Bulgarian Empire	Bulgaria	Capture of Stara Zagora	
1365	Niš	Serbian Empire	Serbia		
1382	Sofia	Bulgarian Empire	Bulgaria	Siege of Sofia	
1388	Ruse (Rusçuk)	Bulgarian Empire	Bulgaria		
1389	Varna	Bulgarian Empire	Bulgaria		
1393	Veliko Tarnovo (Tırnova)	Bulgarian Empire	Bulgaria	Siege of Tarnovo	
1395	Nikopol (Niğbolu)	Bulgarian Empire	Bulgaria		
1395	Ohrid (Ohri)	Gropa Lordship	North Macedonia		
1395	Krujë (Akçahisar) (First occupation)	Principality of Albania	Albania		
1396	Sati	Zaharia Lordship of Sati	Albania		Vassal
1396	Silistra (Silistre)	Bulgarian Empire	Bulgaria		
1396	Vidin	Bulgarian Empire	Bulgaria		
1417	Vlorë (Avlonya)	Principality of Valona	Albania		
1417	Giurgiu (Yergöğü)	Principality of Wallachia	Romania		
1419	Constanța (Köstence)	Principality of Wallachia	Romania		
1426	Smyrna (İzmir)	Aydinids	Turkey		
1430	Thessaloniki (Selânik)	Republic of Venice	Greece	Siege of Thessalonica	
1431	Ioannina (Yânya)	Despotate of Epirus	Greece		
1450	Berat (Arnavut Belgradı, Berat)	Lordship of Berat/ League of Lezhë	Albania		
1453	Constantinople (Konstantiniye, Istanbul)	Byzantine Empire	Turkey	Fall of Constantinople	
1458	Athens (Atina)	Duchy of Athens	Greece		
1459	Pristina (Priştine)	Serbian Despotate	Kosovo (Note: Disputed territory)		
1460	Bitola (Monastir, Manastır)	Bulgarian Empire	North Macedonia		
1460	Skopje (Üsküp)	Bulgarian Empire	North Macedonia		
1461	Trebizond (Trabzon)	Empire of Trebizond	Turkey	Siege of Trebizond	
1461	Sarajevo (Saray-ı Bosna, Saraybosna) Founded by Ottomans		Bosnia and Herzegovina		
1461	Jajce (Royal Seat of the Bosnian King) (Note: Fall of the Kingdom of Bosnia)	Bosnian Kingdom	Bosnia and Herzegovina		
1466	Iconium (Konya)	Karamanids	Turkey		
1468	Mostar	Bosnian Kingdom	Bosnia and Herzegovina		
1470	Chalcis (Euboea-Eğriboz island)		Greece		
1474	Podgorica (Podgoriçe)		Montenegro		
1475	Bakhchisaray (Bahçesaray)	Crimean Khanate	Ukraine		Vassal
1475	Feodosiya (Kefe)	Republic of Genoa	Ukraine		
1475	Sudak	Republic of Genoa	Ukraine		
1475	Azov (Azak)		Russia		
1478	Lezhë	Republic of Venice	Albania	Siege of Shkodra	
1479	Shkodër (İşkodra)	Republic of Venice	Albania	Siege of Shkodra	
1480	Otranto	Principality of Taranto	Italy	Invasion of Otranto	Brief acquisition
1484	Bilhorod-Dnistrovskyi (Akkerman)	Principality of Moldavia	Ukraine		
1514	Arz-i Rûm (Erzurum)		Turkey		
1514	Tabriz (Tebriz)		Iran		
1514	Ardabil (Erdebil)		Iran		
1515	Van		Turkey		
1515	Kara Amid (Diyâr-i Bekr, Diyarbakır)		Turkey		
1515	Urmiah (Ürmiye)		Iran		
1516	Antiochia (Antakya)		Turkey		
1516	Aleppo (Halep)		Syria		
1516	Damascus (Trablus-i Şâm, Şam)		Syria		
1516	Beirut		Lebanon		
1516	Amman		Jordan		
1516	Jerusalem (Kudüs)		Palestine		
1516	Jaffa (Yafa)		Palestine		
1517	Cairo (Kâhire)	Mamluk Sultanate	Egypt		
1517	Damietta (Dumyat)	Mamluk Sultanate	Egypt		
1517	Mecca (Mekke)		Saudi Arabia		
1517	Jeddah (Cidde)		Saudi Arabia		
1521	Belgrade (Belgrad)	Kingdom of Hungary	Serbia		
1522	Rhodes (Rodos)	Knights Hospitaller	Greece	Siege of Rhodes	
1526	Tvrđa		Croatia		
1529	Algiers (Cezayir)		Algeria	Capture of Algiers	
1529	Odesa (Hacibey)	Grand Duchy of Lithuania	Ukraine		
1531	Diu		India	Siege of Diu	Brief acquisition
1534	Tunis (Tunus)		Tunisia	Conquest of Tunis	
1534	Baghdad (Bağdat)	Safavid Empire	Iraq	Capture of Baghdad	
1537	Klis (Clissa, Kilis)		Croatia	Siege of Klis	
1538	Basra		Iraq		
1538	Aden		Yemen	Capture of Aden	
1538	San'a		Yemen		
1538	Tighina (Bender)	Principality of Moldavia	Moldova		
1538	Brăila (İbrail)	Principality of Wallachia	Romania		
1539	Herceg Novi (Yeni Hersek)		Montenegro	Siege of Castelnuovo	
1541	Buda (Budin)	Kingdom of Hungary	Hungary	Siege of Buda	
1543	Esztergom (Estergon)	Kingdom of Hungary	Hungary	Siege of Esztergom	
1547	Van		Turkey	Siege of Van	
1551	Gozo		Malta	Invasion of Gozo	Brief acquisition
1551	Tripoli (Trablus-i Gârb, Trablusgarp)		Libya	Siege of Tripoli	
1552	Muscat		Oman		
1552	Touggourt		Algeria	Marching overland to Sahara	
1552	Timișoara (Temeşvar)	Eastern Hungarian Kingdom	Romania	Siege of Temesvár (1552)	
1555	Béjaïa		Algeria	Capture of Bougie	
1557	Massawa		Eritrea		
1566	Szigetvár (Zigetvar)	Kingdom of Hungary	Hungary	Siege of Szigetvár	
1567	Zabid		Yemen		
1571	Ulcinj (Ulqin/Dulcigno)	Republic of Venice	Montenegro		
1571	Nicosia (Lefkoşa)		Cyprus		
1578	Akhaltsikhe (Ahıska)		Georgia		
1578	Yerevan		Armenia		
1578	Benghazi		Libya		
1578	Tbilisi (Tiflis)		Georgia		
1578	Ganja (Gence)		Azerbaijan		
1578	Baku (Bakü)		Azerbaijan		
1584	Lori		Armenia		
1587	Hamadan (Hamedan)		Iran		
1590	Derbent		Russia (Dagestan)		
1594	Győr (Yanık)	Kingdom of Hungary	Hungary		
1596	Eger (Eğri)	Kingdom of Hungary	Hungary	Siege of Eger	
1600	Nagykanizsa (Kanije)	Kingdom of Hungary	Hungary	Siege of Kanije	
1645	Chania (Hanya)		Greece		
1660	Oradea (Varat)	Principality of Transylvania	Romania		
1663	Nové Zámky (Uyvar)	Kingdom of Hungary	Slovakia	Siege of Érsekújvár	
1669	Heraklion (Kandiye)		Greece	Siege of Candia	
1672	Kamianets-Podilskyi (Kamaniçe)		Ukraine		
1678	Chyhyryn (Çehrin)		Ukraine		
1683	Perchtoldsdorf		Austria	Battle of Vienna	Brief acquisition
1713	Khotyn (Hotin)	Principality of Moldavia	Ukraine	Conquest	
1852	Doha		Qatar		Vassal
1869	Manama		Bahrain		Vassal

== See also ==
- List of Ottoman Empire territories
- Battles involving the Ottoman Empire
- List of Ottoman sieges and landings
