= Sanaksar Monastery =

Monastery in Mordovia, Russia

Coordinates: 54°39′11″N 43°09′56″E

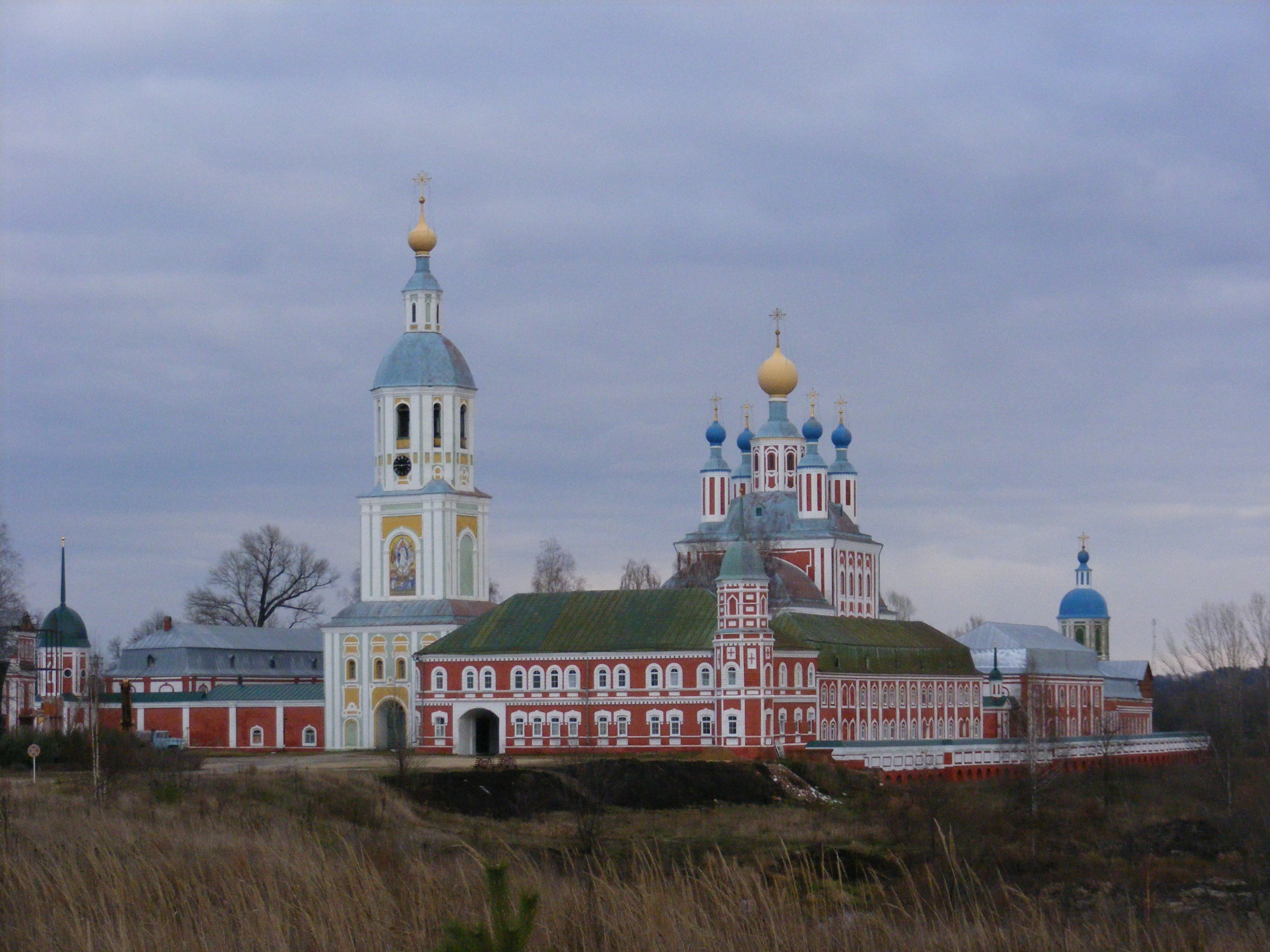
Sanaksar monastery, 2008

The Sanaksar Monastery of the Nativity of the Mother of God is located in the Russian Federation, in the Temnikov district of Republic Mordovia.

The monastery was founded in 1659. It was returned to the Russian Orthodox church in 1991.

The relics of the patron of the Russian Navy and of the Russian nuclear-armed strategic bombers, Admiral Fyodor Ushakov is enshrined in the monastery.
