= Cathedral of St. Theodore Ushakov =

Cathedral in Saransk, Russia

Coordinates: 54°10′53″N 45°10′54″E

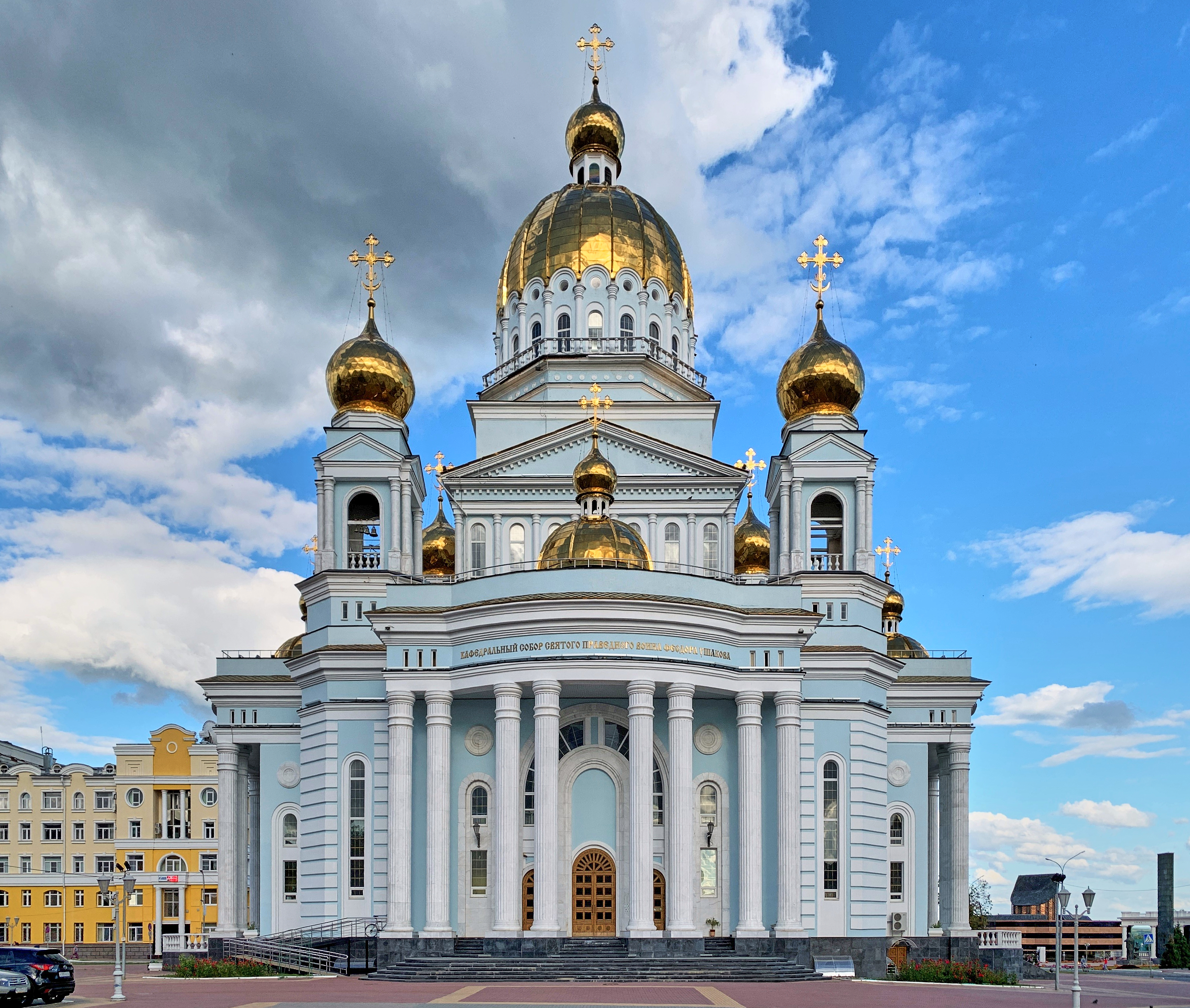

The Cathedral of St. Theodore Ushakov (Russian: Собор Святого Феодора Ушакова) is a Russian Orthodox cathedral in Saransk, serving as the cathedral of the Diocese of Saransk. The cathedral is named for Russian saint and admiral Fyodor Ushakov.

== Cathedral history ==
In 1991, the Holy Synod of Russian Orthodox Church became independent from the Diocese of Penza. The first meeting of the new administration took place in the Church of St. John the Divine, which, soon proved too small to perform this function. In this regard, the archbishop Barsanuphius Sudakov of Saransk and Mordovia appealed to the authorities of the Republic of Mordovia, with a request to approve the construction of a new cathedral. After the canonization of Admiral Fyodor Ushakov in 2001, he was elected as a patron Saint of the cathedral. In coordination with the municipal authorities the cathedral has placed in the area of intersection of Bolshevitskaya and Sovetskaya streets. In 2002 construction was given the status of republican, and he was supported by a number of private sponsors. The cornerstone was placed on May 8, 2002. The construction was completed in 2006.

== Opening ==
On, August 6, 2006, the cathedral was opened and consecrated by the Patriarch of Moscow and all Rus', Alexy II.

The cathedral is built in the style of the Empire the cross-type. Along the perimeter of the building there are four belfry, with 12 bells. The biggest one weighs 6 tons, followed by 3 tons, 1.5 tons, and further on down the line. Now the bell rings every Sunday and on holidays, calling the believers to worship.

Around the main "bowl" of the cathedral, there is an observation deck, where from the height of approximately 40-meters people can see a panorama of the city of Saransk and surrounding neighborhoods.

== Architecture ==
The iconostasis of the cathedral is made of precious wood and covered with gold. It is divided into three: a central one is dedicated in honor of Saint Feodor Ushakov, the right limit in honor of Saint Seraphim of Sarov, and the left limit in honor of the martyrs and confessors of Mordovia. From the three entrances to the Cathedral there are balconies. The magnificent reliquaries around the columns are made by countrymen from the Zubovo-Polyansky district. All icons for the iconostasis and kiot were painted by artist and iconographer I. G. Shemyakin.

The basement of the church includes a baptismal area of the Transfiguration with the baptistery, an auditorium, classrooms for Sunday school, refectory, prosfornaya, offices of the Rector and sacristan, a room for the priests, the sacristy, library, technical and other facilities.

The ground floor has a gallery of photos on the history of the construction of the cathedral from the foundation stone to his consecration, the arrival at Mordovia Kirill I of Moscow in 2011, and pilgrimage trips to Masters Varsonofy greatest shrines of Christianity.
