= Dmitri Proshin (footballer, born 1974) =

Russian footballer (born 1974)

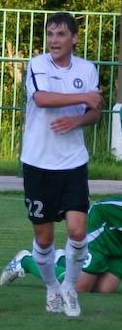
- Proshin in action for FC Torpedo Vladimir

Personal information
- Full name: Dmitri Lvovich Proshin
- Date of birth: 23 January 1974 (age 52)
- Place of birth: Temnikov, Mordovia, Russian SFSR
- Height: 1.78 m (5 ft 10 in)
- Positions: Midfielder; defender

Team information
- Current team: FC Torpedo Vladimir
- Number: 33

Senior career*
Years	Team	Apps	(Gls)
1992	FC Torpedo Vladimir	1	(0)
2000	FC Torpedo Vladimir (D4)		
2001–2012	FC Torpedo Vladimir	289	(5)
- * Club domestic league appearances and goals

Dmitri Lvovich Proshin (Russian: Дмитрий Львович Прошин; born 23 January 1974) is a former Russian professional football player.

== Club career ==
He played two seasons in the Russian Football National League for FC Torpedo Vladimir.
