= Temnikovsky District =

Temnikovsky District Темниковский район (Russian)
- District

Other transcription(s)
  - Moksha: Темникавонь аймак
  - Erzya: Чополтбуе
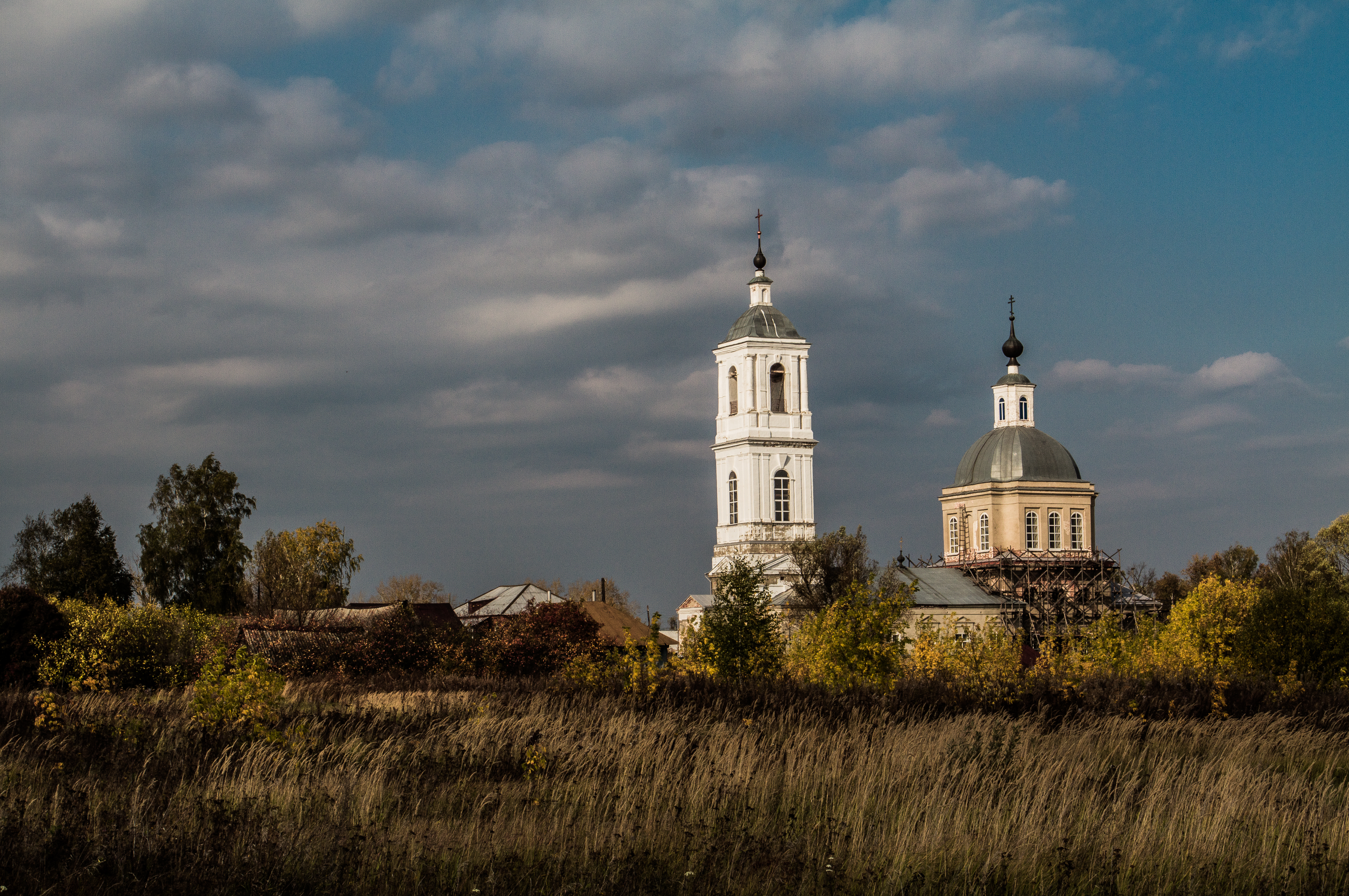
- Church in Temnikovsky District

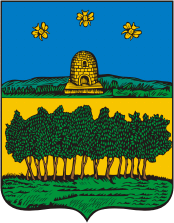
- Coat of arms
- Location of Temnikovsky District in the Republic of Mordovia
- Coordinates: 54°37′N 43°12′E
- Country: Russia
- Federal subject: Republic of Mordovia
- Established: 16 July 1928
- Administrative center: Temnikov

Area
  - Total: 1,936.8 km^{2} (747.8 sq mi)

Population (2010 Census)
  - Total: 17,261
  - Density: 8.9121/km^{2} (23.082/sq mi)
  - Urban: 42.0%
  - Rural: 58.0%

Administrative structure
  - Administrative divisions: 1 Towns of district significance, 16 Selsoviets
  - Inhabited localities: 1 cities/towns, 96 rural localities

Municipal structure
  - Municipally incorporated as: Temnikovsky Municipal District
  - Municipal divisions: 1 urban settlements, 16 rural settlements
- Time zone: UTC+3 (MSK)
- OKTMO ID: 89649000
- Website: http://temnikov.e-mordovia.ru

Population of Temnikovsky District
- 2010 Census: 17,261
- 2002 Census: 21,172
- 1989 Census: 26,782
- 1979 Census: 30,869

Temnikovsky District (Russian: Те́мниковский райо́н; Moksha: Темникавонь аймак, Temnikavoń ajmak; Erzya: Чополтбуе, Čopoltbuje) is an administrative and municipal district (raion), one of the twenty-two in the Republic of Mordovia, Russia. It is located in the northwest of the republic. The area of the district is 1,936.8 square kilometers (747.8 sq mi). Its administrative center is the town of Temnikov. As of the 2010 Census, the total population of the district was 17,261, with the population of Temnikov accounting for 42.0% of that number.

== Administrative and municipal status ==
Within the framework of administrative divisions, Temnikovsky District is one of the twenty-two in the republic. It is divided into one town of district significance (Temnikov) and sixteen selsoviets, all of which comprise ninety-six rural localities. As a municipal division, the district is incorporated as Temnikovsky Municipal District. The town of district significance of Temnikov is incorporated into an urban settlement, and the sixteen selsoviets are incorporated into sixteen rural settlements within the municipal district. The town of Temnikov serves as the administrative center of both the administrative and municipal district.

== See also ==
- Sanaksar Monastery
- Temnikovsky Uyezd
