= Battle of Fidonisi =

1788 battle of the Russo-Turkish War (1787–1792)

- Part of Russo-Turkish War of 1787–1792
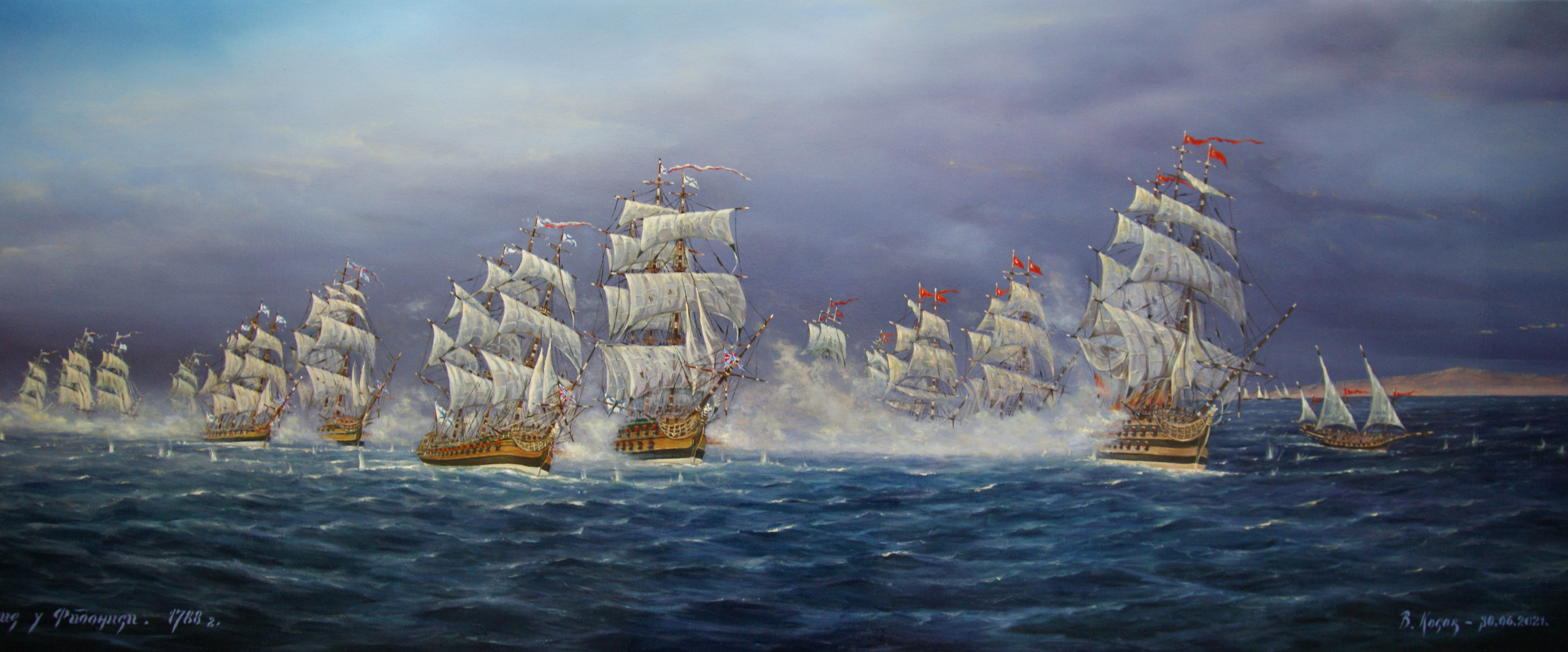
- 2021 painting of the battle
Date	14 July 1788
Location	Off Fidonisi, Black Sea
Result	Russian victory

Belligerents
Russia	Ottoman Empire

Commanders and leaders
Marko Voinovich; Fyodor Ushakov	Cezayirli Gazi Hasan Pasha

Strength
2 ships of the line 10 frigates 24 smaller ships	17 ships of the line 8 frigates 3 bomb vessels 21 smaller ships

Casualties and losses
Unknown	1 xebec sunk

The Battle of Fidonisi took place on 14 July 1788 between the fleets of the Russian Empire under Marko Voinovich's lead and the Ottoman Empire under Cezayirli Gazi Hasan Pasha during the Russo-Turkish War (1787–1792) in the area of Snake Island, which in Greek was called Fidonisi (Φιδονήσι). It was a Russian victory.

== Events ==
On 10 July, the Turkish fleet under Kapudan Pasha (Grand Admiral) Hasan Pasha was seen to the NW by the Russian fleet, which had left Sevastopol under Rear-Admiral Count Voinovich (Voynovich), on 29 June, and had reached Tendra on 10 July. After three days of manoeuvering or lying becalmed in sight of one another, the fleets found themselves near the island of Fidonisi, about 100 miles south of Kinburn.

Voynovich formed a line on the port tack NE and then SE as the wind veered. The Turks bore up and attacked from windward just after 3 pm. The leading Russian ships, the frigates Berislav and Stryela, forced the leading Turks out of line, but were in danger of being cut off until the Russian second-in-command Fyodor Ushakov aboard Sv. Pavel closed the gap.

Hasan Pasha then attacked the leading Russian ships, while his Vice- and Rear-Admirals attacked Voynovich, but his ship damaged, Hasan himself had to leave the line and just before 5 pm the Turks withdrew.

The battle of Fidosini demonstrated Ushakov's high tactical abilities. The Ottoman fleet, using the advantage of speed, moved south. They had lost 1 xebec, which was sunk.

Between 15 and 17 July, the Russian and Turkish fleets manoeuvered to the west of the Crimea; on 18 July, the Turks had disappeared. They sailed back to Ochakov but made no attack.

== Ships involved ==
=== Russia (Count Voinovich) ===
- Preobrazhenie Gospodne 66 (Преображение Господне 66)
- Sv. Pavel 66 (Св. Павел 66)
- Sv. Andrei 50
- Sv. Georgii 50
- Legkii 44
- Perun 44
- Pobyeda 44
- Stryela 44
- Berislav 40
- Fanagoria 40
- Kinburn 40
- Taganrog 34
- 24 small craft

=== Turkey (Hassan el Ghazi) ===
- 5 80-gun battleships
- 12 other battleships
- 8 frigates
- 21 xebecs – 1 sunk
- 3 bombs
- Some small craft

== In popular culture ==
The battle was depicted in the movie "Admiral Ushakov" by Mikhail Romm.

== See also ==
- Attack on Snake Island, an attack on the island in 2022

== Bibliography ==
- Anderson, R. C. (1952). Naval Wars in the Levant 1559–1853. Princeton: Princeton University Press.
- Novikov, Nikolay Vasilyevich (1948). Боевая летопись русского флота [Battle chronicle of the Russian navy] (in Russian). Moscow: Военное издательство министерства вооруженных сил союза ССР.
