= Battle of Kerch Strait (1790) =

1790 naval battle of the Russo-Turkish War (1787–1792)

Coordinates: 44.9000°N 37.0000°E

Battle of (the) Kerch Strait
- Part of Russo-Turkish War, 1787-1792
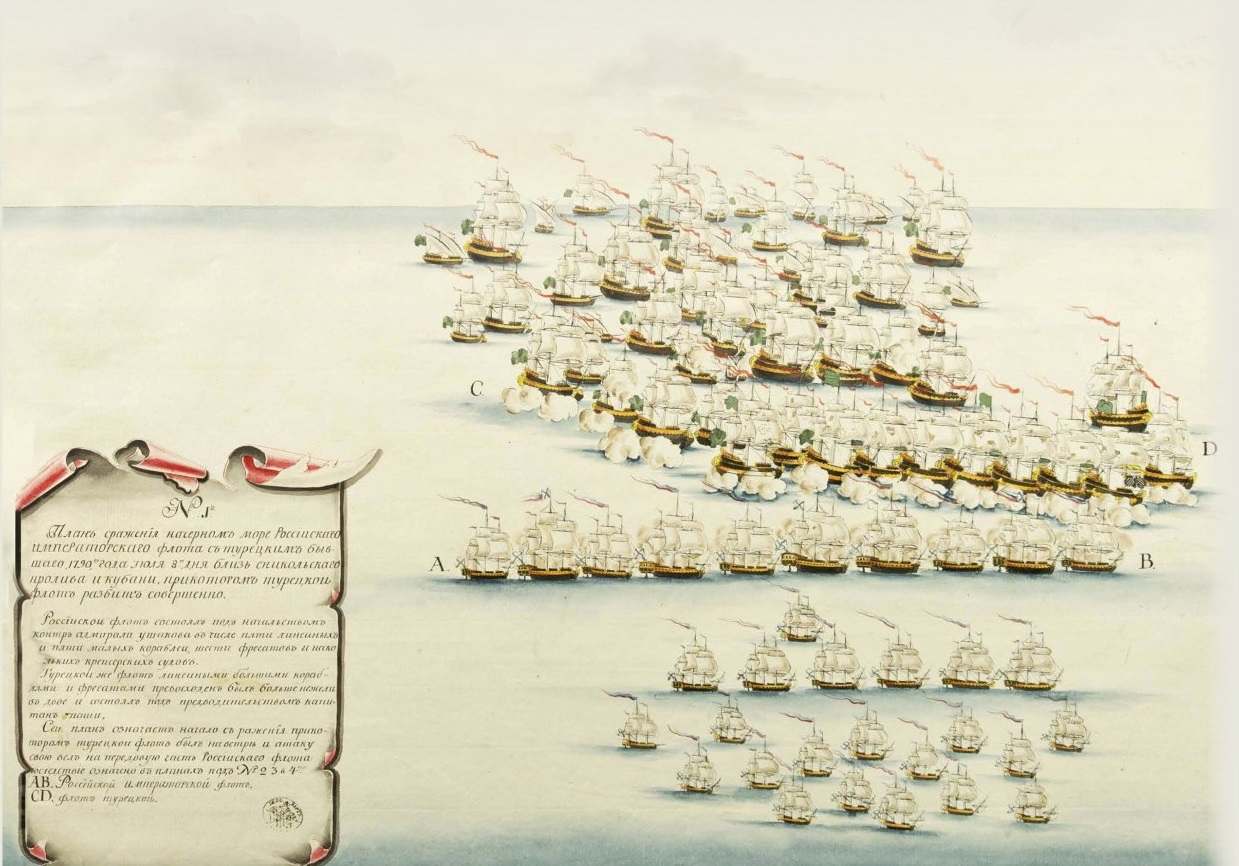
- Battle of Kerch Strait; By Afanasy de Paldo
Date	19 July 1790
Location	Kerch Strait, Crimea
Result	Russian victory

Belligerents
Russian Empire	Ottoman Empire

Commanders and leaders
(Russian Empire) Counter Admiral Fyodor Fyodorovich Ushakov	Kapudan-ı Derya Hussein Pasha

Strength
10 ships of the line, 6 frigates, 1 bomb ship, 1 schooner, 2 fireships, 15 privateers, 836 guns	10 ships of the line, 8 frigates, 36 auxiliary vessels, 1,100 guns

Casualties and losses
29 killed, 68 wounded	1 rowing vessel; heavy personnel losses (unknown exactly)

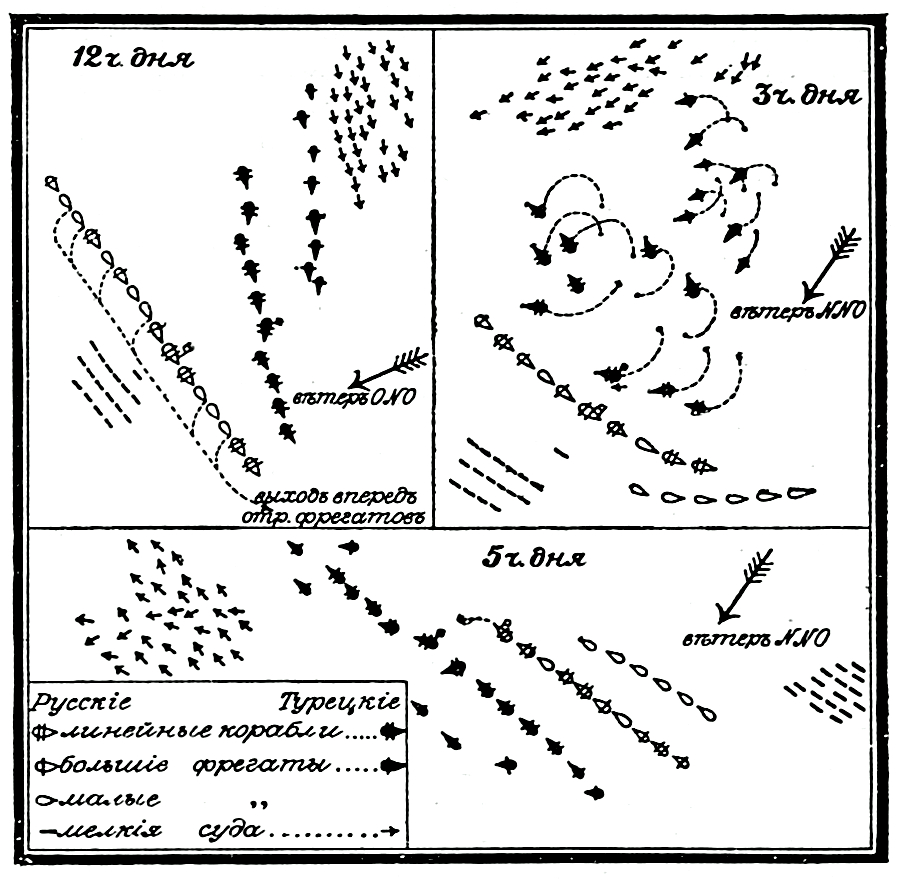
Schematic map to the article "Kerch–Yenikale Canal". Sytin Military Encyclopedia (St. Petersburg, 1911–1915)

The naval Battle of (the) Kerch Strait (also known as Battle of Yenikale, by the old Turkish name of the strait near Kerch) took place on 19 July 1790 near Kerch, Crimea, was a victory for Imperial Russia over the Ottoman Empire during the Russo-Turkish War, 1787-1792.

== Battle ==
The Russian fleet, under Ushakov, sailed from Sevastopol on 13 July 1790 for the southern Crimea, after hearing a report that the Ottoman fleet had been sighted there. On 19 July it anchored at the mouth of the Kerch Strait and sent privateers out in search of the Ottomans. At 10 am they reported a sighting and 30 minutes later the Ottoman fleet came into view from the east. With the wind from the ENE, Ushakov formed a line on the port tack (i.e. south-east). The Ottomans turned from their group formation and formed a parallel line to the east of the Russian line. Seeing that the Ottoman battle-line contained just their battleships, Ushakov sent 6 frigates to form a second line to leeward of the main line, and between about 12pm and 3pm, 3 hours of indecisive longish-range fighting followed, but then the wind changed direction to NNE and the Russians luffed, turning toward the Ottoman line. The Ottomans reversed course, 2 of their ships colliding as they did so, because some ships turned left and others turned right. As the Russians steered toward the tail-end of the Ottomans line, and with the wind from the north, the Ottoman admiral steered away, to the SW. At about 7pm firing ceased. The Russians followed all night, but by morning, the faster ships of the Ottomans were out of sight. Russian casualties were 29 killed and 68 wounded, with very little damage to ships. The Russian victory prevented the Ottoman Empire from achieving its goal in landing an army in Crimea.

== Ships involved ==
=== Russia ===
Rozhdestvo Christovo 84 (flag of Rear-Admiral Fyodor Ushakov)
Maria Magdalina 66
Slava Ekateriny 66
Sv. Pavel 66
Sv. Vladimir 66
Sv. Aleksandr Nevskii 50
Sv. Andrei Pervozvannyi 50
Sv. Georgii Pobyedonosets 50
Ioann Bogoslov 46
Sv. Petr Apostol 46
Fanagoria 40
Kinburn 40
Legkii 40
Perun 40
Stryela 40
Taganrog 40
Sv. Ieronim (bomb)
2 fireships
13 privateers
Polotsk

=== Ottoman Empire ===
Mukaddeme-i Nusret 74 (flag of Kapudane Said Bey)
Bahr-i Zafer 72 (flag of Kapudan Pasha Giritli Hüseyin)
Melik-i Bahri 72 (flag of Patrona Bey)
Anka-i Bahri 72
Fethü'l Fettah 66
Nüvid-i Fütuh 66
Peleng-i Bahri 66
Tevfikullah 66
Feyz-i Hüda 66 (flag of Riyale Bey)
Mesudiye 58
Inayet-i Hakk 58
Burc-ı Zafer 52
Şehbaz-ı Bahri 52
Ukâb-ı Bahri 52
Polâd-ı Bahri 44
Mazhar-ı Saadet 38
Mebdâ-i Nusret 32
Raad-ı Bahri 20 (bomb frigate)
Berk-i Bahri 20 (bomb frigate)
Berk-i Hafız 20 (bomb frigate)
Şihab-ı Sakıb 20 (bomb frigate)
Cedid Bomba 20 (bomb frigate)
23 small craft (kırlangıç, pergende (brigantine) and şehtiye (xebec) type ships)

== Sources ==
- Anderson, R. C. (1952). Naval Wars in the Levant 1559–1853. Princeton: Princeton University Press.
