= Battle of Tendra =

1790 naval battle of the Russo-Turkish War (1787–1792)

Coordinates: 46.2°N 31.8333°E

- Part of Russo-Turkish War (1787–1792)
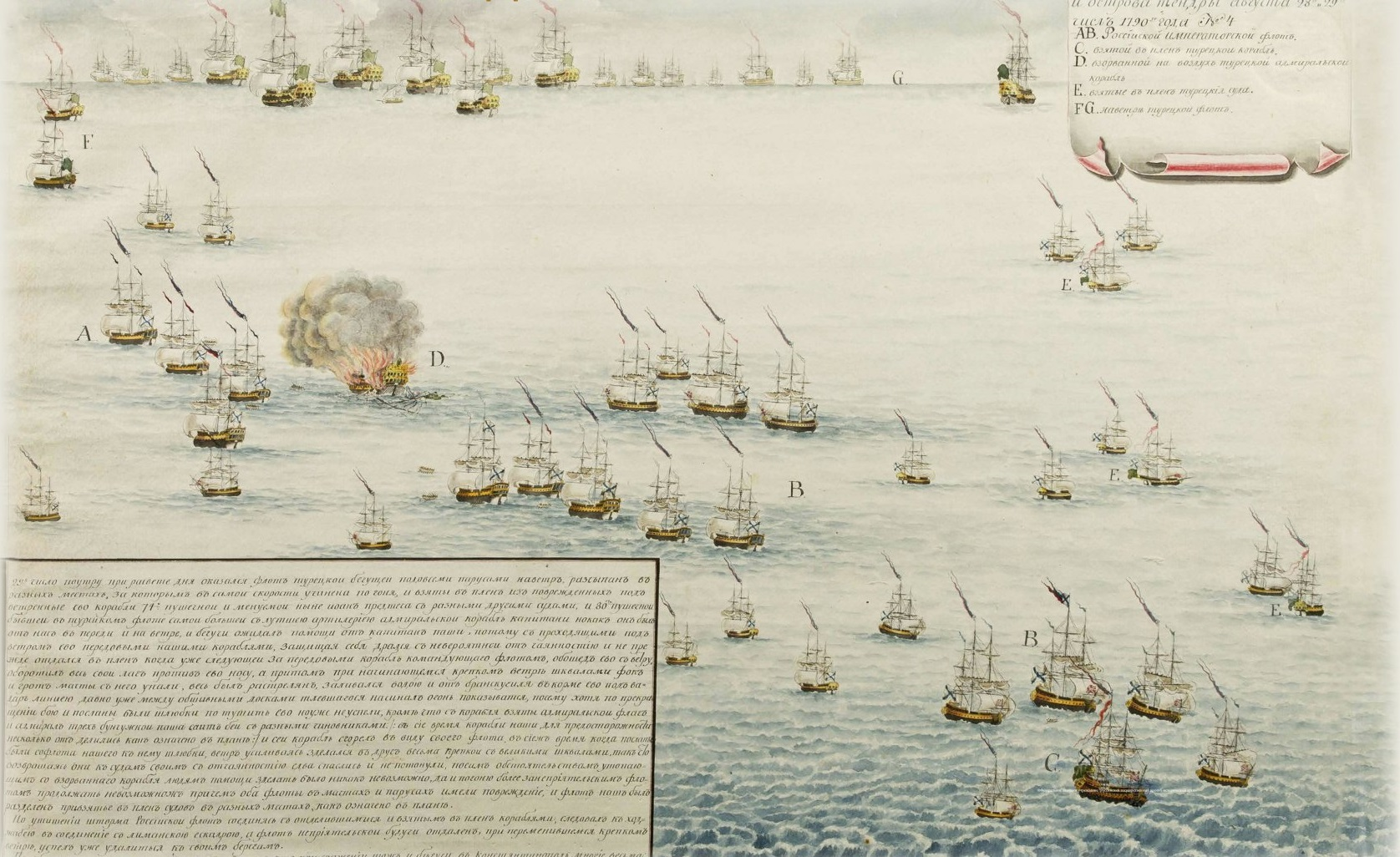
- Battle of Tendra; late 18th century By Afanasy de Paldo
Date	8–9 September 1790
Location	Tendra Spit
Result	Russian victory

Belligerents
Russian Empire	Ottoman Empire

Commanders and leaders
(Russian Empire) Fyodor Ushakov	Hussein Pasha

Strength
10 ships of the line 6 frigates 1 bomb ship 1 schooner 2 fire ships 17 sailing ships ~826 cannons	14 ships of the line 8 frigates 23 smaller vessels 1,300+ cannons

Casualties and losses
21–25 killed, 25 wounded	2 ships of the line in the battle 1 ship of the line and several small vessels sunk in the retreat 7 small craft captured, of which 3 were taken by privateers 2,000 men killed, wounded or captured

The Battle off Tendra
- Painting
- ru:Файл:Сражение у Тендры.jpg

The Battle of Tendra (or the battle of Khadjibey) was a naval action fought on 8 and 9 September 1790 (28 and 29 August, O.S.) in the Black Sea as part of the Russo-Turkish War (1787–1792). It ended in a decisive victory for Ushakov's Russians over the Ottomans.

== Battle ==
The Russian fleet of 10 Ships of the line, 6 frigates and small craft sailed from Sevastopol on 5 September under Fyodor Ushakov for Kherson to pick up some frigates. At 6 a.m. on 8 September it encountered the Ottoman fleet of 14 battleships, 8 frigates and 23 small crafts at anchor near Tendra. As the Ottomans formed into a battle line, the Russian fleet sailed toward the tail end of the Ottoman line in 3 parallel lines, forming into one line as they did so.

The Ottoman admiral, Hussein Pasha, seeing his tail threatened, turned north and came back parallel to the Russians, who followed suit so the two fleets ended up on paralleled tracks, heading north-east. This was completed by about 2 p.m. Ushakov ordered 3 frigates to the off-battle side of the van to guard against an Ottoman doubling of the Russian line (Ottoman ships of the period were usually coppered and therefore several knots faster than Russian ships), leaving 13 ships of 710 guns in his line, opposed to 14 with 900 guns. Ushakov then turned toward the Ottoman ships and firing began at about 3 p.m.

The Ottomans began to bear away and by 6 p.m. were in full retreat. The Russians followed closely, inflicting much damage—in particular, the Ottoman Vice Admiral's ship was attacked by Ioann Bogoslov, and the Admiral's and Rear-Admiral's ships by Rozhdestvo Christovo and Preobrazhenie Gospodne. The Ottomans speed allowed them to get away though, and soon after 8 p.m. firing ceased and the Russians anchored.

The next day, 2 damaged Ottoman ships, the Kapitana (Vice Admiral's ship) and Melike Bahri were seen close by, and the Russians attacked. Melike Bahri surrendered to Maria Magdalina without resistance, but the Kapitana put up a stout resistance. At 10 a.m. she was attacked by Sv. Andrei Pervozvannyi, which brought down her fore topsail, then by Sv. Georgii Pobyedonosets, Preobrazhenie Gospodne and others. By noon she was completely surrounded, but fought on. At 2 p.m. Ushakov in Rozhdestvo Christovo shot away all her masts and placed his ship across her bows, and at 3 p.m. she surrendered. She was seen to be on fire, and blew up after only 20 men, including Said Bey and her captain, had been taken off. Only 101 men were saved out of 800 on board.

Some Russian ships had been chasing the rest of the Ottoman fleet but they were losing ground and at about 4:30 p.m. Ushakov recalled them. Russian privateers later brought in 3 small craft. Russian casualties were 25 killed and 25 wounded, and 733 Ottomans were captured. Several ships had minor damage in their masts and rigging. Russian victory in the Battle of Tendra allowed them to control the Black Sea, and Grigory Potemkin finally considered it possible to begin military action against the Vizier, leading eventually to the siege of Izmail.

== Ships involved ==
=== Russia ===
- Rozhdestvo Christovo 84 (flag of Rear-Admiral Fyodor Ushakov)
- Maria Magdalina 66
- Preobrazhenie Gospodne 66
- Sv. Pavel 66
- Sv. Vladimir 66
- Sv. Aleksandr Nevskii 50
- Sv. Andrei Pervozvannyi 50
- Sv. Georgii Pobyedonosets 50
- Ioann Bogoslov 46
- Sv. Petr Apostol 46
- Fanagoria 40
- Kinburn 40
- Legkii 40
- Perun 40
- Stryela 40
- Taganrog 40
- Rozhdestvo Christovo (bomb)
- Polotsk
- 2 fireships
- 17 privateers

=== Ottoman Empire ===
- Bahr-i Zafer 72 (flag of Kapudan Pasha Giritli Hüseyin)
- Melik-i Bahri 72 (flag of Patrona Bey) Sank at storm on the night of 8–9 September
- Anka-i Bahri 72
- Fethü'l Fettah 66
- Nüvid-i Fütuh 66
- Peleng-i Bahri 66 Captured 9 September
- Tevfikullah 66
- Feyz-i Hüda 66 (flag of Riyale Bey)
- Mesudiye 58
- Mansuriye 58 (flag of Kapudane Said Bey) Blew up 9 September
- Inayet-i Hakk 58
- Burc-ı Zafer 52
- Şehbaz-ı Bahri 52
- Ukâb-ı Bahri 52
- Mazhar-ı Hidâyet 38
- Mazhar-ı Saadet 38
- Mebdâ-i Nusret 32
- Raad-ı Bahri 20 (bomb frigate)
- Berk-i Bahri 20 (bomb frigate)
- Berk-i Hafız 20 (bomb frigate)
- Şihab-ı Sakıb 20 (bomb frigate)
- Cedid Bomba 20 (bomb frigate)
- 23 small craft (kırlangıç, pergende (brigantine) and şehtiye (xebec) type ships) 3 were captured 9 September

== Sources ==
- Anderson, R. C. (1952). Naval Wars in the Levant 1559–1853. Princeton: Princeton University Press.
- Novikov, Nikolay Vasilyevich (1948). Боевая летопись русского флота [Battle chronicle of the Russian navy] (in Russian). Moscow: Военное издательство министерства вооруженных сил союза ССР.
- Petrushevsky, Alexander (1884). Генералиссимус князь Суворов [Generalissimo Prince Suvorov] (in Russian). Vol. 1 (1st ed.). St. Petersburg: Типография М. М. Стасюлевича. p. 378.
