= Battle of Cape Kaliakra =

1791 naval battle of the Russo-Turkish War (1787–1792)

Coordinates: 43.37411°N 28.597412°E

- Part of the Russo-Turkish War (1787–1792)
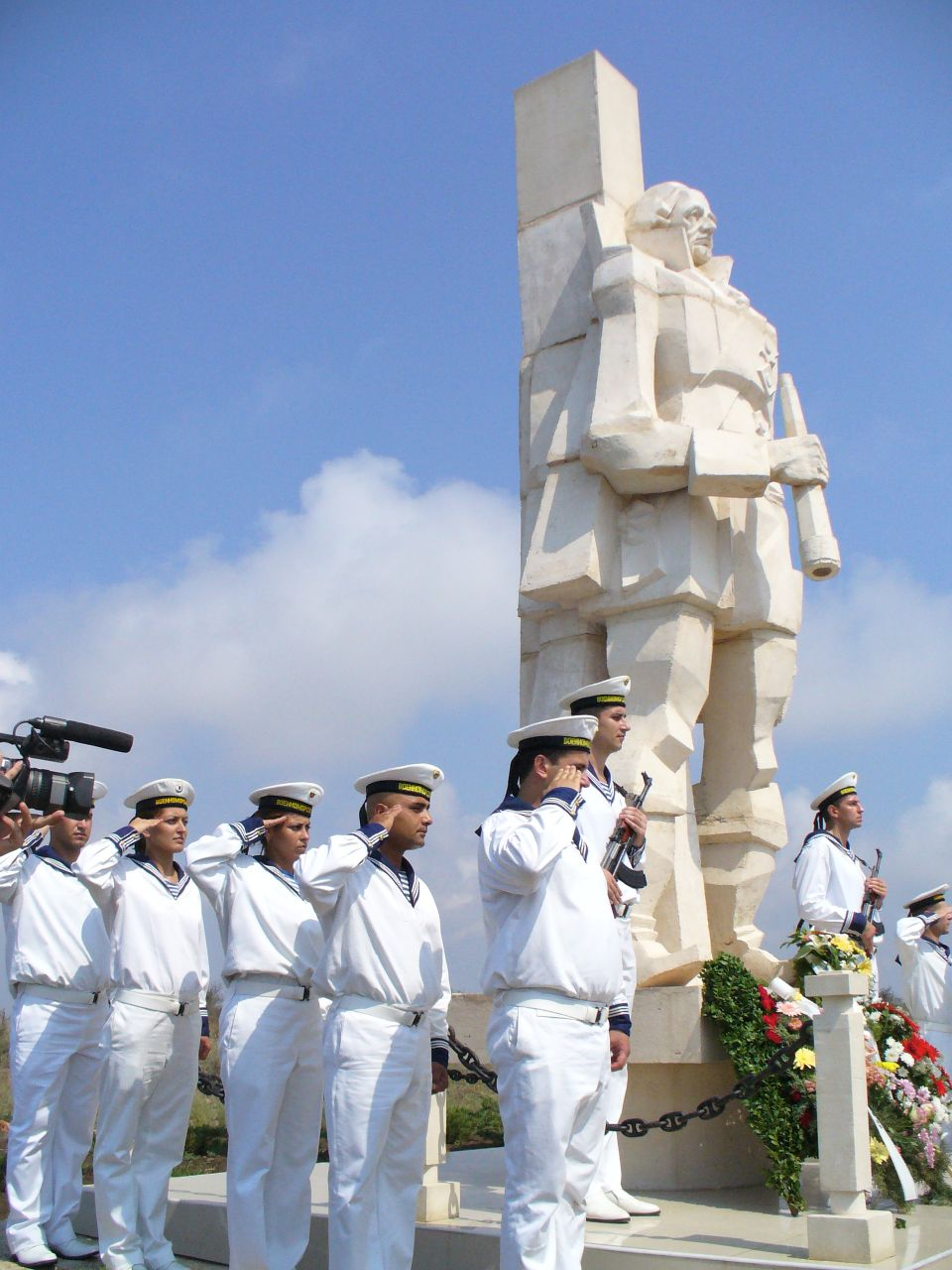
- Bulgarian sailors at the monument to Admiral Ushakov on Cape Kaliakra
Date	11 August 1791
Location	Cape Kaliakra off the coast of northern Bulgaria in the Black Sea
Result	Russian victory; End of the Russo-Turkish War (1787–1792); Treaty of Jassy signed afterwards

Belligerents
Russian Empire	Ottoman Empire: Regency of Algiers

Commanders and leaders
(Russian Empire) Admiral Fyodor Ushakov	(Ottoman Empire) Hussein Pasha; Said Ali

Strength
15 (Note: The source is needed.) to 16 ships of the line 2 frigates 2 bomb vessels 1 schooner 1 fireship 17 sailing ships 998 cannons	18 ships of the line 10 large frigates 7 small frigates 43 to 48 (Note: The source is needed.) small crafts 1,800 cannons The coastal battery (Note: The source is needed.)

Casualties and losses
17 killed and 28 wounded 1 frigate damaged	Unknown, ships sustained heavy damage

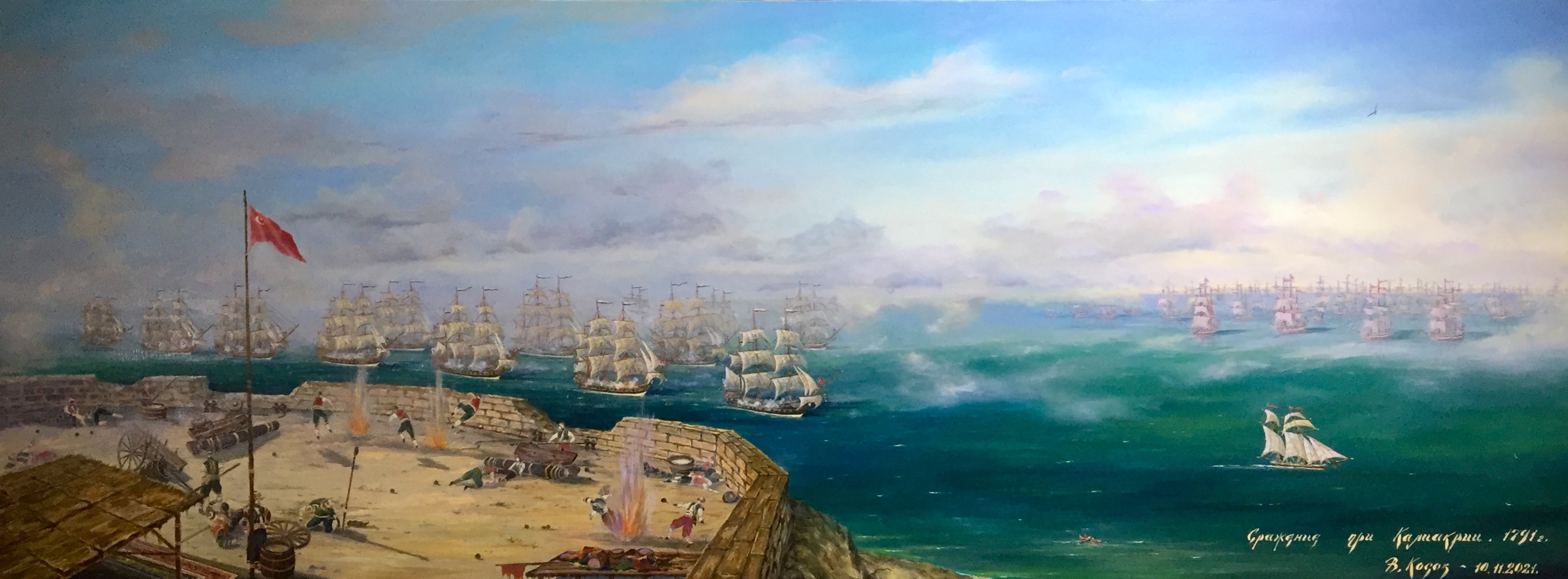
Battle of Kaliakria. F.F. Ushakov 1791. Vladimir Kosov 2021.

The Battle of Cape Kaliakra (Kaliakria, Caliacria; Russian: Калиакрийское сражение) was the last naval battle of the Russo-Turkish War (1787–1792). It took place on 11 August 1791 off the coast of Cape Kaliakra, Bulgaria, in the Black Sea. Neither side lost a ship, but the Ottomans retreated to Istanbul afterwards.

The Russian fleet under Counter (Rear) Admiral Fyodor Ushakov, of 15 ships of the line and two frigates (990 guns), and several small craft sailed from Sevastopol on 8 August, and at midday on 11 August encountered the Ottoman–Algerian fleet under Hussein Pasha of 18 ships of the line and 17 frigates (1,500–1,600 guns) and some smaller craft at anchor just south of Cape Kaliakra. Ushakov sailed, in three columns, from the northeast, between the Ottomans and the cape, despite the presence on the cape of several guns.

Admiral Said Ali, the commander of the Algerian ships, weighed anchor and sailed east, followed by Hussein Pasha with the 18 ships of the line. The Russians then turned around south to a parallel east-south-east course and formed up mostly into one line, with Ushakov in third position and one ship out of line on the off-battle side. Said Ali, leading the line, turned north to try to double the Russian van, but Ushakov sailed out of the line and attacked him, as the rest of the Russian fleet approached. This was at 16:45 (4:45 p.m.). Gradually the Turks turned to the south and when darkness put an end to fighting at 20:30 (8:30 p.m.) they were in full retreat to Istanbul. Russian casualties were 17 killed and 28 wounded, and the frigate Alexander Nevsky was damaged. Ottoman casualty figures are unknown, but their ships were heavily damaged aloft.

== Ships involved ==
Some of the Russian vessels involved and their crew were:

=== Russian Empire ===
- Rozhdestvo Christovo 84 (Nativity of Christ) (flagship)
- Ioann Predtecha 74 (John the Precursor)
- Maria Magdalina 66 (Mary Magdalene)
- Preobrazhenie Gospodne 66 (Transfiguration of the Lord)
- Pavel 66 (Saint Paul)
- Vladimir 66 (St Vladimir)
- Leontii Mutchenik 64 (Saint Leontius)
- Alexander Nevsky' 50 (Saint Alexander Nevsky)
- Andrei Pervozvannyi 50 (Saint Andrew the First-called)
- Nikolai 50 (Saint Nicholas)
- Feodor Stratilat 46 (Theodore Stratelates)
- Ioann Bogoslov 46 (John the Theologian)
- Navarchia Voznesenie Gospodne 46 (Navarchy Ascension of the Lord)
- Pyotr 46 (Saint Peter)
- Tsar Konstantin 46 (Tsar Constantine)
- Fanagoria 40 (Phanagoria)
- Makropolea Sv. Mark Evangelist 36 (Mark the Evangelist)
- Rozhdestvo Christovo (Nativity of Christ) (bomb)
- Ieronim (Saint Jerome) (bomb)
- Panagia Apotumengana (Panagia of Taman) (privateer) 14
- 16 privateers

== Consequence ==
The battle occurred near the end of the Russian-Turkish war, which ended with the signing of the Jassy peace treaty.

For the victory at Cape Kaliakra, the Order of Saint Alexander Nevsky was awarded to Admiral Ushakov.

== Sources ==
- Anderson, R. C. (1952). Naval Wars in the Levant 1559–1853. Princeton: Princeton University Press.
