= Temnikov =

Town in the Republic of Mordovia, Russia

Temnikov Темников
- Town

Other transcription(s)
  - Moksha: Темникав
  - Erzya: Чополт ош
  - Tatar: Төмән, Tömän
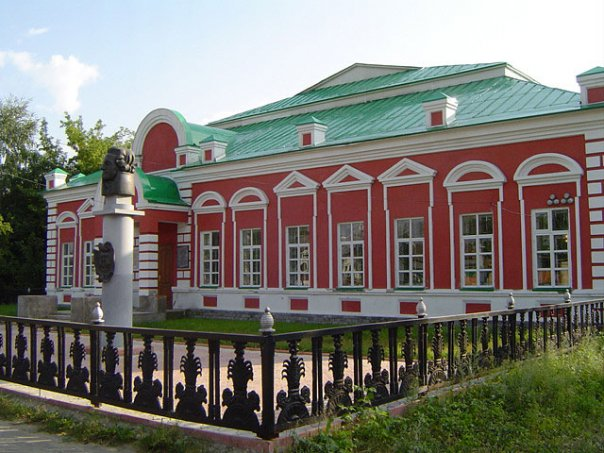
- Museum of Local History in Temnikov

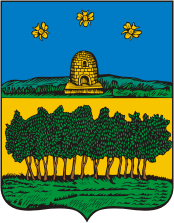
- Coat of arms
- Interactive map of Temnikov
- Location of Temnikov Temnikov (Republic of Mordovia)
- Coordinates: 54°38′N 43°14′E
- Country: Russia
- Federal subject: Mordovia
- Administrative district: Temnikovsky District
- Town of district significanceSelsoviet: Temnikov
- Founded: 1536
- Town status since: 1779

Population (2010 Census)
  - Total: 7,243
  - Estimate (2021): 6,451 (−10.9%)

Administrative status
  - Capital of: Temnikovsky District, town of district significance of Temnikov

Municipal status
  - Municipal district: Temnikovsky Municipal District
  - Urban settlement: Temnikovskoye Urban Settlement
  - Capital of: Temnikovsky Municipal District, Temnikovskoye Urban Settlement
- Time zone: UTC+3 (MSK)
- Postal codes: 431220, 431259
- Dialing code: +7 83445
- OKTMO ID: 89649101001
- Website: temnikov-rm.ru

Temnikov population
- 2010 Census: 7,243
- 2002 Census: 8,375
- 1989 Census: 9,172
- 1979 Census: 7,354

Temnikov (Russian: Темников; Moksha: Темникав, Temnikav; Erzya: Чополт ош, Čopolt oš) is a town and the administrative center of Temnikovsky District in the Republic of Mordovia, Russia. As of the 2010 Census, its population was 7,243.

== History ==
The oldest town in the Republic of Mordovia, it was established in 1536. Town status was granted to it in 1779.

== Administrative and municipal status ==
Within the framework of administrative divisions, Temnikov serves as the administrative center of Temnikovsky District. As an administrative division, it is incorporated within Temnikovsky District as the town of district significance of Temnikov. As a municipal division, the town of district significance of Temnikov is incorporated within Temnikovsky Municipal District as Temnikovskoye Urban Settlement.

== Notable people ==
- Dmitri Proshin (born 1974), footballer
- The WWII German pilot Rudolf Müller, held by the Soviets as a prisoner of war, was on 21 October 1943 shot to death at Temnikov during an escape attempt.

== See also ==
- Alena Arzamasskaia
