= Mackenzie (surname) =

Origin
- Meaning: Son of Coinneach
- Region of origin: Scotland

Other names
- Variant forms: Coinneach, Mackenzie (given name)

Mackenzie, MacKenzie, and McKenzie are of Scottish origin and are related to Clan Mackenzie. The surname Mackenzie is of Scottish origin and derived from Gaelic. The name is an Anglicized form of the Gaelic Mac Coinnich, which is a patronymic form of the personal name Coinneach meaning "comely" or "handsome". Today, the personal name Coinneach is generally Anglicized as Kenneth; however, Kenneth was originally used as an Anglicization of a different Gaelic personal name, Cionaodh. Mackenzie was originally written MacKenȝie and pronounced [məˈkɛŋjiː] in Scots, with the "z" representing the old Middle-Scots letter, "ȝ" yogh.

There are Lowland Scots words and Scottish names that have been affected in a similar way (for example, the surname Menzies).

== People with the surname ==
=== Mackenzie, MacKenzie ===
==== A-I ====
- Adam MacKenzie, (born 1984), Scottish field hockey defender
- Aggie MacKenzie (born 1955), Scottish television presenter
- Alastair Mackenzie (born 1970), Scottish actor
- Alasdair MacKenzie (born 1965), Scottish Geneticist at the University of Aberdeen.
- Alexander Mackenzie (explorer) (1764–1820), explorer and employee Hudson's Bay Company
- Alexander Mackenzie (politician) (1822–1892), building contractor and writer, second prime minister of Canada
- Alexander Mackenzie of Kintail (died 1488), chief of the Clan Mackenzie
- Alexander Mackenzie (composer) (1847–1935), British musician, composer
- Alexander Slidell Mackenzie (1803–1848), U.S. Navy officer
- Alexander Johnston Mackenzie (1912–1945), Scottish barrister, soldier, and author
- Alister MacKenzie (1870–1934), British golf course designer
- Anna Maria Mackenzie (fl. 1783–1811), British novelist
- Anne MacKenzie (disambiguation), several people
- Arthur John Mackenzie (1871–1949), Scottish chess master
- Billy Mackenzie (1957–1997), Scottish singer, member of the rock band The Associates
- Bruce Roy MacKenzie (died 1978), British intelligence operative and Minister of Agriculture in Kenya
- Cameron Mackenzie (disambiguation), several people
- Catriona McKenzie, Australian filmmaker
- Chris MacKenzie (ice hockey) (born 1975), Canadian ice hockey coach
- Colin Mackenzie, 1st Earl of Seaforth, (died 1633), chief of the Clan Mackenzie
- Colin Mackenzie (1754–1821), Surveyor General of India, art collector and orientalist
- Colin Mackenzie (1877–1938), Australian anatomist, benefactor and museum administrator
- Colin Mackenzie (British Army officer) (1861–1956), Canadian Chief of the General Staff
- Colin Cam Mackenzie of Kintail (died 1594), chief of the Clan Mackenzie
- Colin Hercules Mackenzie (1898–1986), Head of S.O.E. in the Far East
- Compton Mackenzie (1883–1972), Scottish novelist
- Dan Mackenzie, American songwriter-producer
- Dan MacKenzie, Canadian sports and marketing executive
- Dave MacKenzie (politician) (born 1947), Canadian politician
- D. J. M. Mackenzie (1905–1994), British colonial medical official
- Donald Alexander Mackenzie (1873–1936), Scottish journalist and folklorist
- Donald Angus MacKenzie, professor of sociology at the University of Edinburgh, Scotland
- Donald MacKenzie (rower), Canadian rower who won a medal at the 1904 Summer Olympics
- Duncan Mackenzie, British archaeologist
- Elizabeth MacKenzie (disambiguation), several people
- Eric Francis MacKenzie, American Roman Catholic bishop
- Francis MacKenzie (born 1960), leader of Nova Scotia Liberal Party
- George Mackenzie (disambiguation), several people
- George Mackenzie of Rosehaugh (1636‑1691), Scottish lawyer and legal writer
- George Mackenzie, 2nd Earl of Seaforth (died 1651), chief of the Clan Mackenzie
- George Henry Mackenzie (1837–1891), Scottish-born American chess champion
- Gisele MacKenzie (1927–2003), Canadian singer
- Gladys Mackenzie (1903–1972), Scottish physicist
- Hector Roy Mackenzie (died 1528), landowner in Gairloch
- Henry Mackenzie (1745–1831), Scottish novelist
- Ian Alistair Mackenzie (1890–1949), Canadian parliamentarian
- Ian Mackenzie-Kerr (1929–2005), British book designer

==== J-Z ====
- Jack Mackenzie (1888–1984), Canadian engineer and academic
- James Cameron Mackenzie (1852–1931), American educator
- James MacKenzie (VC) (1889–1914), Scottish soldier, recipient of the Victoria Cross
- James Mackenzie (actor) (born 1979), Scottish actor
- Jane Mackenzie (1825–1893), Canadian second wife of Alexander Mackenzie
- Janet Mackenzie (born 1962), British Anglican priest
- Jean Kenyon Mackenzie (1874–1936), American writer and missionary in West Africa
- John Mackenzie (disambiguation), several people
  - John Mackenzie (VC) (1869–1915), Scottish, recipient of the Victoria Cross
  - John MacKenzie (Medal of Honor) (1886–1933), American Medal of Honor recipient
  - John Joseph Mackenzie (1865–1922), Canadian pathologist
  - John Stuart Mackenzie (1860–1935), British philosopher
  - Jock Mackenzie, Scottish footballer
- Kelvin MacKenzie (born 1946), editor/media figure, United Kingdom
- Kenneth MacKenzie (disambiguation), multiple people
- Laurence MacKenzie, Scottish footballer
- Lewis MacKenzie (born 1940), retired Canadian general and writer
- Lisa McKenzie (born 1968), British anarchist and academic
- Marie Henry Mackenzie (1878-1961), Dutch painter
- Marion Mackenzie (born 1873), British medical doctor and suffragette
- Morell Mackenzie (1837–1892), British physician
- Murdo MacKenzie (courtier) (died 1590), Scottish landowner and builder of Fairburn Tower
- Murdo MacKenzie (minister) (1835–1912), minister of the Free Church of Scotland
- Murdo MacKenzie (1850–1939), Scottish raconteur, Colorado and Brazilian cattle rancher
- Neil MacKenzie (born 1976), English football player
- Norman MacKenzie (disambiguation), several people
  - Norman MacKenzie (politician) (1894–1986), Canadian author, lawyer, professor and member of the senate
  - Norman Mackenzie (conductor), American conductor
- Osgood Mackenzie (1842–1922), Scottish gardener and landowner
- Paul Mackenzie (also spelled as Paul Makenzi), Kenyan evangelical preacher who is the co-founder and leader of the Malindi cult
- Peter Samuel George Mackenzie (1862–1914), Canadian politician
- Ranald S. Mackenzie (1840–1889), U.S. Army Civil War and Indian Wars officer
- Robert MacKenzie (disambiguation), several people
  - Robert C. MacKenzie (1948–1995), American professional soldier
  - Robert Ramsay Mackenzie (1811–1873), premier of Queensland, Australia
  - Robert W. Mackenzie (1928–2011), politician in Ontario, Canada
- Ruth Mackenzie, British artistic director
- Sally MacKenzie, American romance author
- Sofía MacKenzie (born 1972), Argentine field hockey player
- Stephen Mackenzie (1844–1909), British medical doctor
- Talitha MacKenzie, American ethnomusicologist
- Thomas Mackenzie (disambiguation), several people
  - Thomas MacKenzie (Russian admiral) (1740–1786), Russian rear admiral, founder of the city of Sevastopol in Crimea, Russian Empire
  - Thomas Mackenzie (1854–1930), prime minister of New Zealand
- Walter Mackenzie (1909–1978), Canadian surgeon and academic
- Warren MacKenzie (1924–2018), American craft potter
- William Lyon Mackenzie (1795–1861), Canadian journalist and rebel
- William Lyon Mackenzie King (1874–1950), tenth prime minister of Canada
- William Mackenzie (disambiguation), several people

=== McKenzie ===
- A. Daniel McKenzie (1924–1989), Canadian politician
- Albert Edward McKenzie (1898–1918), English Victoria Cross recipient
- Archibald McKenzie (born 1841), American politician in New Brunswick
- Archibald McKenzie (footballer) (1863–1946), Scottish footballer for Clyde and West Bromwich Albion
- Archie McKenzie (fl. 1900s), Scottish footballer for Partick Thistle
- Benjamin McKenzie (born 1978), US actor
- Bob McKenzie (broadcaster), Canadian broadcaster
- Bret McKenzie (born 1976), New Zealand actor and musician, member of Flight of the Conchords
- Charles E. McKenzie (1896–1956), American politician
- Dan McKenzie (geophysicist) (born 1942), British professor and geologist
- Daniel Duncan McKenzie (1859–1927), Canadian politician
- Dave McKenzie (runner) (born 1943), New Zealand long-distance runner
- Davida McKenzie (born 2006 or 2007), New Zealand actress
- Don McKenzie (footballer, born 1927)
- Donald McKenzie (explorer) (1783–1851), Scottish-Canadian explorer and governor of the Red River Settlement
- Duke McKenzie (born 1963), English boxing commentator and former professional boxer
- Duncan McKenzie, English footballer
- Elizabeth McKenzie (disambiguation), several people
- Fay McKenzie (1916–2019), American actress
- Frank McKenzie, American United States Marine Corps general
- Frank McKenzie (footballer), Scottish footballer
- George McKenzie (footballer, born 1908), Scottish footballer
- Graham Douglas "Garth" McKenzie (born 1941), Australian and Western Australian cricketer
- Harry McKenzie, American rapper
- Hector McKenzie (footballer), Scottish footballer
- Isaiah McKenzie (born 1995), American football player
- Jack McKenzie (disambiguation), several people
- Jacqueline McKenzie (born 1967), Australian actress
- Jacqueline McKenzie (lawyer), British human rights lawyer
- James Mckenzie (outlaw) (born c. 1820), Infamous New Zealand outlaw and folk hero of Scottish Gael heritage
- James A. McKenzie (Wisconsin politician) (1862–1918), American politician
- Jemma McKenzie-Brown (born 1992), British/American actor
- John McKenzie (disambiguation), several people
- Johnnie McKenzie, rapper, better known as Jay Rock on the music label Strange Music
- Julia McKenzie (born 1941), actress (Miss Marple)
- Kahlil McKenzie (born 1997), American football player
- Kareem McKenzie (born 1979), American professional football player
- Ken McKenzie (1923–2003), Canadian newspaper publisher and sports journalist
- Kevin McKenzie (disambiguation), several people
- Leon McKenzie (born 1978), English footballer
- Linsey Dawn McKenzie (born 1978), British model
- Lionel W. McKenzie (born 1919), American economist
- Luke McKenzie (triathlete) (born 1981), Australian triathlete
- Lynton McKenzie (1940–1999), American firearms engraver
- Marc McKenzie (born 1985), Scottish footballer
- Mark McKenzie (born 1999), American soccer player
- Mary Beth McKenzie (born 1946), painter of contemporary figures
- Neil McKenzie (born 1975), South African cricketer
- Nick McKenzie, Australian investigative journalist
- Paul McKenzie (disambiguation), several people
- Peter McKenzie (disambiguation), several people
- Precious McKenzie (born 1936), New Zealand weightlifter, born in South Africa
- R. Tait McKenzie (1867–1938), Canadian-born American surgeon and sculptor
- Sarah McKenzie, Australian jazz musician
- Scott McKenzie (1939–2012), American singer-songwriter
- Thomasin McKenzie (born 2000), a New Zealand actress
- Toby McKenzie (1953–2013), American businessman and philanthropist.
- Triston McKenzie (born 1997), American baseball player
- William McKenzie (disambiguation), several people
- William M. McKenzie, called Red McKenzie (1907–1948), American jazz musician
- Winston McKenzie (born 1953), British politician and former amateur boxer

== Characters ==
- Barry McKenzie, an early creation of Barry Humphries
- Bob and Doug McKenzie, from Second City Television
- Cindy "Mac" Mackenzie, from Veronica Mars
- Harry Mackenzie, from School Rumble
- James and Nell Mackenzie, from the Canadian novel The Incredible Journey and the 1963 film
- Mack and Karen MacKenzie, from Knots Landing
- Myles MacKenzie, from Metroid Prime 4: Beyond
- Rachel McKenzie (Numbuh 362), from Codename: Kids Next Door
- Robert MacKenzie, from Andrea Newman's book and TV drama MacKenzie
- Lt. Col. Sarah MacKenzie, USMC, from JAG
- William and Polly McKenzie, from The Inbetweeners

== Other uses ==
- The Al-Rashid Street located on al-Rasheed Street in Baghdad, Iraq
