= Donald McKenzie =

Don or Donald McKenzie (also Mackenzie or MacKenzie) may refer to:

== Sports ==
- Don MacKenzie (rower) (1874–1925), Canadian rower who won a medal at the 1904 Summer Olympics
- D. K. A. MacKenzie (1916–1940), Scottish rugby union player
- Don McKenzie (Canadian football) (1920–2001), Canadian football player
- Don McKenzie (footballer, born 1927) (1927–1987), Scottish footballer for Grimsby Town
- Don McKenzie (footballer, born 1939) (1939–2026), Australian rules footballer with Essendon
- Don McKenzie (footballer, born 1942), Australian rules footballer and coach of Footscray
- Don McKenzie (swimmer) (1947–2008), American Olympic swimmer
- Donnie McKenzie (born 1960), British Olympic fencer
- Donald MacKenzie (archer), American archer
- Don McKenzie (curler) (born 1957), Canadian curler

== Politics ==
- Donald McKenzie (explorer) (1753–1851), Scottish-Canadian explorer and governor of the Red River Settlement
- Donald Mackenzie, Lord Mackenzie (1818–1875), Scottish judge, styled Lord Mackenzie
- Donald MacKenzie (Ontario politician), provincial politician from Middlesex East, 1883–1886
- Donald Gordon McKenzie (1887–1963), member of the Legislative Assembly of Manitoba
- Donald Mackenzie-Kennedy (1889–1965), governor of Nyasaland (1939–1942)

== Others ==
- Donald Alexander Mackenzie (1873–1936), Scottish journalist and writer on mythology
- Donald C. MacKenzie (1931–2021), Canadian Forces Air Command general
- Don McKenzie (conservationist), American wildlife conservationist and naturalist
- Donald McKenzie (academic) (1931–1999), New Zealander bibliographer
- Donald MacKenzie (sociologist) (born 1950), professor of sociology at the University of Edinburgh, Scotland
- Don McKenzie (sports medicine), Canadian founder of Abreast in a Boat
- Donald Mackenzie (trader) (born c. 1840), abolitionist and trader

== See also ==
- The Strength of Donald McKenzie, 1916 American silent short film
- McKenzie Lectures, in memory of Donald McKenzie, bibliographer
