= George McKenzie =

George McKenzie may refer to:

- George McKenzie (boxer) (1901–1941), Scottish boxer
- George McKenzie (wrestler), Scottish wrestler
- George McKenzie (footballer, born 1908) (1908–1974), Scottish amateur footballer
- George McKenzie (Irish footballer) (died 2006), Republic of Ireland soccer international

== See also ==
- George MacKenzie (disambiguation)
