= MacKenzie (Russian nobility) =

Scots-Russian noble family

- Parent house: Clan MacKenzie
- Country: Russian Empire

The MacKenzie family (Russian: Меке́нзи) is the name of Russian noble family of Scottish origin.

== History ==
Member of this family are descendants of Rear Admiral Thomas MacKenzie (Russian: Фома Калинович Мекензи, romanized: Foma Kalinovich (Colin) Mekenzi), who was in the service of the Russia Navy .

== Notable members ==
- Foma Fomich Mekenzi (1740–1786), was a Scottish-Russian rear admiral who founded the city of Sevastopol in service of the Russian Empire in 1783. Of Scottish Catholic origin of Clan Mackenzie, he was born in the spring of 1740, two years after his parents' marriage. His mother Ann MacKenzie (née Young) was the granddaughter of Admiral Thomas Gordon, Governor of Kronstadt.

== Descendants ==
Thomas MacKenzie had a son born to Maria Wady, whose descendants are living today.
