= Frank McKenzie =

Frank McKenzie or MacKenzie may refer to

- Frank MacKenzie (politician) (1873–1932), Canadian politician
- Frank McKenzie (footballer), Scottish footballer
- Kenneth F. McKenzie Jr., American military general
- Frank Mackenzie Ross (1891–1971), lieutenant governor of British Columbia

== See also ==
- Francis MacKenzie (disambiguation)
