= Thomas Mackenzie (disambiguation) =

Sir Thomas Mackenzie (1853–1930) was prime minister of New Zealand in 1912, and later high commissioner.

Thomas Mackenzie or Thomas McKenzie may also refer to:

- Thomas MacKenzie (Russian admiral) (1740–1786), rear admiral, founder of Sevastopol
- Thomas Mackenzie (Royal Navy officer) (1753–1813), Royal Navy admiral
- Thomas Mackenzie (1789–1822), MP for Ross-shire, 1818–1822
- Thomas Mackenzie (Scottish politician) (1793–1856), MP for Ross and Cromarty, 1837–1847
- Thomas Mackenzie, Lord Mackenzie (1807–1869), Scottish judge
- Thomas Mackenzie (Australian politician) (1854–1934), member of the New South Wales Legislative Assembly
- Thomas Mackenzie (illustrator) (1887–1944), illustrator
- Tom MacKenzie (1882–1927), Australian rules footballer
- Thomas McKenzie (footballer), Scottish footballer for Third Lanark and Plymouth Argyle
- Tommy McKenzie (1906–1990), Scottish footballer for Motherwell
- Tam McKenzie (1922–1967), Scottish footballer for Hearts
- Thomas McKenzie (priest) (1971–2021), American Anglican priest and author
- Thomas McKenzie (American football), American indoor footballer

== See also ==
- Thomasin McKenzie (born 2000), New Zealand actress
