= Robert Grierson =

Robert Grierson may refer to:

- Sir Robert Grierson, 1st Baronet (1655–1733)
- Robert Grierson (missionary) (1868–1965)
- Bob Grierson (footballer) (1887-1944), footballer for Bradford Park Avenue and Rochdale, see List of Rochdale A.F.C. players (25–99 appearances)
- Bob Grierson, World Curling Federation (WCF) Hall of Fame
