= Hector McKenzie =

Hector McKenzie may refer to:

- Hector McKenzie (footballer)
- Hector McKenzie (cyclist)
