= Robert MacKenzie =

Robert MacKenzie or similar may refer to:

== Entertainers ==
- Bob McKenzie (actor) (1880–1949), 1940s film actor
- Bob McKenzie (broadcaster) (born 1956), Canadian ice hockey broadcaster
- Bob McKenzie (active since 1980), fictional character from the Bob and Doug McKenzie comedy skit
- Robert Mackenzie, actor in the film The Woman Eater (1957)

== Politicians ==
- Sir Robert Mackenzie, 10th Baronet (1811–1873), premier of Queensland, Australia
- Robert McKenzie (Australian politician) (1865–1928), MP and government minister in Western Australia
- Robert McKenzie (Canadian politician) (1875–1942), Liberal party member of the Canadian House of Commons
- Robert W. Mackenzie (1928–2011), Canadian politician, cabinet minister
- Bobby McKenzie, unsuccessful candidate in United States House of Representatives elections in Michigan, 2014

== Sportsmen ==
- Sir Robert Campbell MacKenzie (1856–1945), British Army officer and Scottish international rugby union player
- Robert Lee McKenzie (1870–1956), American politician, first mayor of Panama City, Florida
- Robert Mackenzie (cricketer) (1886–1934), English cricketer
- Bob McKenzie (footballer) (1928–2012), Australian rules football player for Melbourne
- Robert McKenzie (footballer, born 1950), Australian rules football player for Melbourne
- Robert McKenzie (rugby union) (1869–1940), New Zealand rugby union player
- Robert McKenzie (Scottish footballer), Scottish footballer

== Others ==
- Robert Mackenzie (trader) (fl. 1836–1853), Scottish-born businessman
- Robert Mackenzie Johnston (1843–1918), Scottish-Australian statistician and man of science
- R. Tait McKenzie (1867–1938), Canadian-born American surgeon and sculptor
- Robert McKenzie (aviator) (1895–1945), Australian World War I flying ace
- Robert McKenzie (psephologist) (1917–1981), Canadian academic & statistical analyst of elections
- Robert C. MacKenzie (1948–1995), American professional soldier noteworthy for service in the Rhodesian SAS
- Robert Mackenzie (sound engineer), Australian sound engineer
- Bob Mackenzie (businessman) (born 1952), British businessman
- Robert L. McKenzie, American domestic and foreign policy analyst
- Robert Cameron Mackenzie (1920–2000), Scottish thermoanalyst and clay mineralogist
