= William Mackenzie =

William Mackenzie, McKenzie, Mckenzie or MacKenzie may refer to:

== Artists, musicians, writers and entertainers ==
- William Lyon Mackenzie (1795–1861), Scottish-born journalist & rebel in Upper Canada; grandfather of Canadian prime minister William Lyon MacKenzie King
  - William Lyon Mackenzie (fireboat)
- William Mackay Mackenzie (1871–1952), Scottish historian, archaeologist and writer
- Will Mackenzie (born 1938), American television director and actor
- Billy Mackenzie (William MacArthur MacKenzie, 1957–1997), Scottish singer

== Politicians and noblemen ==
- Bill McKenzie, Baron McKenzie of Luton (1946-2021), English politician
- William Mackenzie, 1st Baron Amulree (1860–1942), British barrister, public servant and politician
- William Mackenzie, 5th Earl of Seaforth (died 1740), Scottish nobleman
- William Albany McKenzie (1928–1991), mayor of Fremantle, Western Australia, and administrator of Christmas Island
- William Alexander McKenzie (1874–1966), builder and political figure in British Columbia
- William Forbes Mackenzie (1807–1862), Scottish Conservative politician and temperance reformer
- William H. MacKenzie (1890–1972), New York assemblyman
- William McKenzie (Australian politician) (1883–1969), Victorian state politician

== Sportsmen ==
- Bill MacKenzie (William Kenneth MacKenzie, 1911–1990), Canadian ice hockey player
- Bill McKenzie (ice hockey) (William Ian McKenzie, born 1949), Canadian ice hockey player
- Bill McKenzie (footballer) (1889–1983), Australian footballer for Melbourne
- Bill S. McKenzie (1934–1974), Australian footballer for Richmond
- Bill McKenzie (rugby league) (1923–1985), New Zealand rugby league player
- Will MacKenzie (William Ruggles MacKenzie, born 1974), American golfer
- Billy MacKenzie (motorcyclist) (born 1984), Scottish motocross racer
- William McKenzie (rugby union) (1871–1943), international New Zealand rugby union player
- William McKenzie (sailor) (born 1997), New Zealand sailor
- William Mackenzie (hammer thrower), Scottish athlete

== Other people ==
- William Mackenzie (contractor) (1794–1851), British civil engineering contractor
- William Mackenzie (ophthalmologist) (1791–1868), Scottish ophthalmologist
- William Mackenzie (railway entrepreneur) (1849–1923), railway contractor and entrepreneur in Canada, the United States, and Brazil
- William Leslie Mackenzie (1862–1935), doctor in public health
- Sir Colin Mackenzie (anatomist) (William Colin Mackenzie, 1877–1938), Australian anatomist, benefactor, museum administrator and director
- William Douglas Mackenzie (1859–1936), American theologian
- William Gregor MacKenzie (1904-1995), plantsman and gardener
- William Macdonald Mackenzie (1797–1856), Scottish architect
- William MacKenzie (missionary) (1897–1972), Australian missionary
- William McKenzie (missionary) (1861–1895), Canadian missionary
- William Mackenzie (publisher), publisher of natural history books in the 1870s
- W. J. M. Mackenzie (William James Millar Mackenzie, 1909–1996), British political scholar
- William John MacKenzie (1894–?), American flying ace

== Characters ==
- Will McKenzie (Inbetweeners), fictional character
