= 1935–36 FA Cup =

Tournament details
- Country: England; Wales

Final positions
- Champions: Arsenal (2nd title)
- Runners-up: Sheffield United

The 1935–36 FA Cup was the 61st season of the world's oldest football cup competition, the Football Association Challenge Cup, commonly known as the FA Cup. Arsenal won the competition for the second time, beating Sheffield United 1–0 in the final at Wembley, through a late goal from Ted Drake.

Matches were scheduled to be played at the stadium of the team named first on the date specified for each round, which was always a Saturday. Some matches, however, might be rescheduled for other days if there were clashes with games for other competitions or the weather was inclement. If scores were level after 90 minutes had been played, a replay would take place at the stadium of the second-named team later the same week. If the replayed match was drawn further replays would be held until a winner was determined. If scores were level after 90 minutes had been played in a replay, a 30-minute period of extra time would be played.

== Calendar ==
Round	Date
Extra preliminary round	Saturday 7 September 1935
Preliminary round	Saturday 21 September 1935
First round qualifying	Saturday 5 October 1935
Second round qualifying	Saturday 19 October 1935
Third round qualifying	Saturday 2 November 1935
Fourth round qualifying	Saturday 16 November 1935
First round proper	Saturday 30 November 1935
Second round proper	Saturday 14 December 1935
Third round proper	Saturday 11 January 1936
Fourth round proper	Saturday 25 January 1936
Fifth round proper	Saturday 15 February 1936
Sixth round proper	Saturday 29 February 1936
Semi-finals	Saturday 21 March 1936
Final	Saturday 25 April 1936

== Qualifying rounds ==
Most participating clubs that were not members of the Football League competed in the qualifying rounds to secure one of 25 places available in the first round.

The 25 winners from the fourth qualifying round were Blyth Spartans, Ferryhill Athletic, Scarborough, Kells United, Workington, Darwen, Wigan Athletic, Stalybridge Celtic, Gainsborough Trinity, Scunthorpe & Lindsey United, Burton Town, Grantham, Kidderminster Harriers, Boston United, Southall, Walthamstow Avenue, Dartford, Folkestone, Romford, Margate, Nunhead, Dulwich Hamlet, Newport (IOW), Cheltenham Town and Yeovil & Petter's United.

Those appearing in the competition proper for the first time were Ferryhill Athletic, Kells United and Newport (IOW). Kells (at that time) was a small coal mining village on the outskirts of Whitehaven much better known in sporting circles for its amateur rugby league exploits. Although population data from the 1931 Census would be destroyed in a wartime fire, Kells United remains undoubtedly one of the smallest community clubs ever to qualify for the FA Cup first round.

Southall was the most successful club from the extra preliminary round, progressing to the third round proper after defeating Hayes, Civil Service, Marlow, Wycombe Wanderers, Uxbridge, Enfield, Swindon Town and Newport (IOW). Kidderminster Harriers and Nunhead also went from the extra preliminary round to the main competition this season, with Nunhead going out in the first round and Kidderminster in the second.

== First round proper ==
At this stage 41 clubs from the Football League Third Division North and South joined the 25 non-league clubs that came through the qualifying rounds. Stockport County, Millwall and Luton Town were given byes to the third round. To make the number of matches up, non-league Bishop Auckland and Corinthian were given byes to this round, with Bishop Auckland being the winner of the previous season's FA Amateur Cup.

34 matches were scheduled to be played on Saturday, 30 November 1935. Six were drawn and went to replays in the following midweek fixture.

Tie no	Home team	Score	Away team	Date
1	Chester	1–0	Gateshead	30 November 1935
2	Chesterfield	3–0	Southport	30 November 1935
3	Darlington	4–2	Accrington Stanley	30 November 1935
4	Barrow	4–1	Wrexham	30 November 1935
5	Bristol City	0–1	Crystal Palace	30 November 1935
6	Grantham	0–2	Notts County	30 November 1935
7	Southall	3–1	Swindon Town	30 November 1935
8	Reading	8–3	Corinthian	30 November 1935
9	Walsall	2–0	Lincoln City	30 November 1935
10	Crewe Alexandra	4–2	Boston United	30 November 1935
11	Gainsborough Trinity	3–1	Blyth Spartans	30 November 1935
12	Scarborough	2–0	Darwen	30 November 1935
13	Tranmere Rovers	3–0	Carlisle United	30 November 1935
14	Kidderminster Harriers	4–1	Bishop Auckland	30 November 1935
15	Northampton Town	0–0	Bristol Rovers	30 November 1935
Replay	Bristol Rovers	3–1	Northampton Town	4 December 1935
16	Coventry City	1–1	Scunthorpe & Lindsey United	30 November 1935
Replay	Scunthorpe & Lindsey United	4–2	Coventry City	9 December 1935
17	Brighton & Hove Albion	0–0	Cheltenham Town	30 November 1935
Replay	Cheltenham Town	0–6	Brighton & Hove Albion	4 December 1935
18	Clapton Orient	0–0	Aldershot	30 November 1935
Replay	Aldershot	0–1	Clapton Orient	4 December 1935
19	Oldham Athletic	6–1	Ferryhill Athletic	30 November 1935
20	Nunhead	2–4	Watford	30 November 1935
21	Exeter City	0–4	Gillingham	30 November 1935
22	Mansfield Town	2–3	Hartlepools United	30 November 1935
23	Cardiff City	0–3	Dartford	30 November 1935
24	Halifax Town	4–0	Rochdale	30 November 1935
25	Stalybridge Celtic	4–0	Kells United	30 November 1935
26	Newport County	0–1	Southend United	30 November 1935
27	Margate	3–1	Queens Park Rangers	30 November 1935
28	Yeovil & Petter's United	0–1	Newport (IOW)	30 November 1935
29	Dulwich Hamlet	2–3	Torquay United	30 November 1935
30	New Brighton	1–3	Workington	30 November 1935
31	Walthamstow Avenue	1–1	Bournemouth & Boscombe Athletic	30 November 1935
Replay	Bournemouth & Boscombe Athletic	8–1	Walthamstow Avenue	4 December 1935
32	York City	1–5	Burton Town	30 November 1935
33	Romford	3–3	Folkestone	30 November 1935
Replay	Folkestone	2–1	Romford	4 December 1935
34	Wigan Athletic	1–2	Rotherham United	30 November 1935

== Second round proper ==
The matches were played on Saturday, 14 December 1935. Six matches were drawn, with replays taking place in the following midweek fixture. One of these, Halifax Town against Hartlepools United, went to a second replay.

Tie no	Home team	Score	Away team	Date
1	Chester	3–3	Reading	14 December 1935
Replay	Reading	3–0	Chester	18 December 1935
2	Chesterfield	0–0	Walsall	14 December 1935
Replay	Walsall	2–1	Chesterfield	19 December 1935
3	Dartford	4–0	Gainsborough Trinity	14 December 1935
4	Bournemouth & Boscombe Athletic	5–2	Barrow	14 December 1935
5	Southall	8–0	Newport (IOW)	14 December 1935
6	Folkestone	1–2	Clapton Orient	14 December 1935
7	Notts County	3–0	Torquay United	14 December 1935
8	Crewe Alexandra	2–1	Gillingham	14 December 1935
9	Scarborough	1–1	Brighton & Hove Albion	14 December 1935
Replay	Brighton & Hove Albion	3–0	Scarborough	18 December 1935
10	Tranmere Rovers	6–2	Scunthorpe & Lindsey United	14 December 1935
11	Oldham Athletic	1–1	Bristol Rovers	14 December 1935
Replay	Bristol Rovers	4–1	Oldham Athletic	18 December 1935
12	Southend United	5–0	Burton Town	14 December 1935
13	Halifax Town	1–1	Hartlepools United	14 December 1935
Replay	Hartlepools United	0–0	Halifax Town	18 December 1935
Replay	Halifax Town	1–4	Hartlepools United	23 December 1935
14	Stalybridge Celtic	0–1	Darlington	14 December 1935
15	Margate	3–1	Crystal Palace	14 December 1935
16	Workington	5–1	Kidderminster Harriers	14 December 1935
17	Rotherham United	1–1	Watford	14 December 1935
Replay	Watford	1–0	Rotherham United	18 December 1935

== Third round proper ==
The 44 First and Second Division clubs entered the competition at this stage along with Stockport County, Millwall and Luton Town.

The matches were scheduled for Saturday, 11 January 1936. Twelve matches were drawn and went to replays in the following midweek fixture. Margate, Southall, Dartford and Workington were the last clubs from the qualifying rounds remaining in the competition, with Southall featuring in their ninth round of the tournament.

Tie no	Home team	Score	Away team	Date
1	Blackpool	3–1	Margate	11 January 1936
2	Darlington	2–3	Bury	11 January 1936
3	Burnley	0–0	Sheffield United	11 January 1936
Replay	Sheffield United	2–1	Burnley	16 January 1936
4	Liverpool	1–0	Swansea Town	11 January 1936
5	Southall	1–4	Watford	11 January 1936
6	Reading	1–3	Manchester United	11 January 1936
7	Walsall	0–2	Newcastle United	11 January 1936
8	Leicester City	1–0	Brentford	11 January 1936
9	Notts County	0–0	Tranmere Rovers	11 January 1936
Replay	Tranmere Rovers	4–3	Notts County	15 January 1936
10	Blackburn Rovers	1–1	Bolton Wanderers	11 January 1936
Replay	Bolton Wanderers	0–1	Blackburn Rovers	15 January 1936
11	Aston Villa	0–1	Huddersfield Town	11 January 1936
12	Wolverhampton Wanderers	1–1	Leeds United	11 January 1936
Replay	Leeds United	3–1	Wolverhampton Wanderers	15 January 1936
13	Crewe Alexandra	1–1	Sheffield Wednesday	11 January 1936
Replay	Sheffield Wednesday	3–1	Crewe Alexandra	15 January 1936
14	Middlesbrough	1–0	Southampton	11 January 1936
15	West Bromwich Albion	2–0	Hull City	11 January 1936
16	Sunderland	2–2	Port Vale	11 January 1936
Replay	Port Vale	2–0	Sunderland	13 January 1936
17	Derby County	3–2	Dartford	11 January 1936
18	Everton	1–3	Preston North End	11 January 1936
19	Doncaster Rovers	1–2	Nottingham Forest	11 January 1936
20	Stockport County	2–3	Plymouth Argyle	11 January 1936
21	Tottenham Hotspur	4–4	Southend United	11 January 1936
Replay	Southend United	1–2	Tottenham Hotspur	15 January 1936
22	Manchester City	3–1	Portsmouth	11 January 1936
23	Fulham	2–1	Brighton & Hove Albion	11 January 1936
24	Barnsley	3–3	Birmingham	11 January 1936
Replay	Birmingham	0–2	Barnsley	15 January 1936
25	Bristol Rovers	1–5	Arsenal	11 January 1936
26	West Ham United	2–2	Luton Town	11 January 1936
Replay	Luton Town	4–0	West Ham United	15 January 1936
27	Norwich City	1–1	Chelsea	11 January 1936
Replay	Chelsea	3–1	Norwich City	15 January 1936
28	Bradford City	1–0	Bournemouth & Boscombe Athletic	11 January 1936
29	Millwall	0–0	Stoke City	11 January 1936
Replay	Stoke City	4–0	Millwall	15 January 1936
30	Clapton Orient	3–0	Charlton Athletic	11 January 1936
31	Bradford Park Avenue	3–2	Workington	11 January 1936
32	Hartlepools United	0–0	Grimsby Town	11 January 1936
Replay	Grimsby Town	4–1	Hartlepools United	14 January 1936

== Fourth round proper ==
The matches were scheduled for Saturday, 25 January 1936, although four games were played at later dates. Four games were drawn and went to replays in the following midweek fixture, of which one went to a second replay.

Tie no	Home team	Score	Away team	Date
1	Liverpool	0–2	Arsenal	25 January 1936
2	Preston North End	0–0	Sheffield United	25 January 1936
Replay	Sheffield United	2–0	Preston North End	30 January 1936
3	Leicester City	6–3	Watford	25 January 1936
4	Sheffield Wednesday	1–1	Newcastle United	27 January 1936
Replay	Newcastle United	3–1	Sheffield Wednesday	29 January 1936
5	Middlesbrough	3–0	Clapton Orient	25 January 1936
6	Derby County	2–0	Nottingham Forest	25 January 1936
7	Tranmere Rovers	2–4	Barnsley	25 January 1936
8	Tottenham Hotspur	1–0	Huddersfield Town	25 January 1936
9	Manchester City	2–1	Luton Town	25 January 1936
10	Fulham	5–2	Blackpool	25 January 1936
11	Bradford City	3–1	Blackburn Rovers	3 February 1936
12	Chelsea	4–1	Plymouth Argyle	25 January 1936
13	Bradford Park Avenue	1–1	West Bromwich Albion	29 January 1936
Replay	West Bromwich Albion	1–1	Bradford Park Avenue	3 February 1936
Replay	Bradford Park Avenue	2–0	West Bromwich Albion	10 February 1936
14	Port Vale	0–4	Grimsby Town	25 January 1936
15	Leeds United	3–2	Bury	29 January 1936
16	Stoke City	0–0	Manchester United	25 January 1936
Replay	Manchester United	0–2	Stoke City	29 January 1936

== Fifth round proper ==
The matches were scheduled for Saturday, 15 February 1936, except for the Chelsea–Fulham derby game, which was played four days later. There were three replays, played in the next midweek fixture.

Tie no	Home team	Score	Away team	Date
1	Grimsby Town	3–2	Manchester City	15 February 1936
2	Middlesbrough	2–1	Leicester City	15 February 1936
3	Sheffield United	3–1	Leeds United	15 February 1936
4	Newcastle United	3–3	Arsenal	15 February 1936
Replay	Arsenal	3–0	Newcastle United	19 February 1936
5	Barnsley	2–1	Stoke City	15 February 1936
6	Bradford City	0–1	Derby County	15 February 1936
7	Chelsea	0–0	Fulham	19 February 1936
Replay	Fulham	3–2	Chelsea	24 February 1936
8	Bradford Park Avenue	0–0	Tottenham Hotspur	15 February 1936
Replay	Tottenham Hotspur	2–1	Bradford Park Avenue	17 February 1936

== Sixth round proper ==
The four quarter-final ties were scheduled to be played on Saturday, 29 February 1936. There were no replays.

Tie no	Home team	Score	Away team	Date
1	Grimsby Town	3–1	Middlesbrough	29 February 1936
2	Sheffield United	3–1	Tottenham Hotspur	29 February 1936
3	Fulham	3–0	Derby County	29 February 1936
4	Arsenal	4–1	Barnsley	29 February 1936

== Semi-finals ==
The semi-final matches were played on Saturday, 21 March 1936. Sheffield United and Arsenal won their matches to meet in the final at Wembley

21 March 1936
15:00

Sheffield United	2–1	Fulham

Molineux Stadium, Wolverhampton

21 March 1936
15:00

Arsenal	1–0	Grimsby Town

Leeds Road, Huddersfield

== Final ==
The 1936 FA Cup Final was contested by Arsenal and Sheffield United at Wembley. Arsenal won by a single goal, scored by Ted Drake.

=== Match details ===
25 April 1936
15:00 BST

Arsenal	1–0	Sheffield United
Drake 74'	Report

Wembley, London
Attendance: 93,384
Referee: Harry Nattrass

Arsenal	Sheffield United

== See also ==
- FA Cup Final Results 1872-
