= Siege of Danzig (1734) =

Siege during War of the Polish Succession

- Part of the War of the Polish Succession
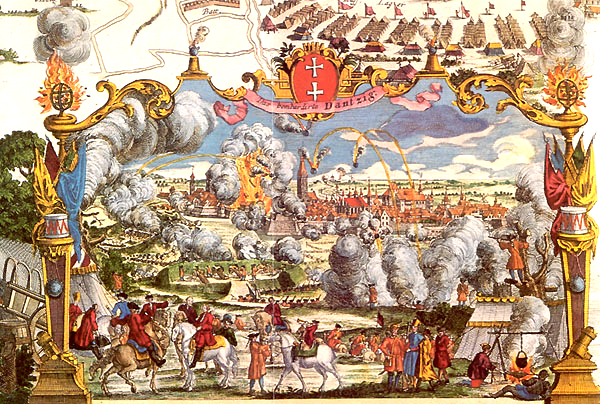
- Depiction of the siege
Date	22 February – 30 June 1734
Location	Gdańsk (Danzig), Poland 54°22′N 18°38′E
Result	Russo-Saxon victory

Belligerents
Augustus III; Russia: • (Russian Empire) Imperial Navy; Electorate of Saxony	Stanisław I France

Commanders and leaders
Army: (Russian Empire) Peter Lacy; (Russian Empire) Burkhard Christoph von Münnich; (Electorate of Saxony) Johann Adolf II, Duke of Saxe-Weissenfels; Fleet: (Russian Empire) Thomas Gordon	Stanisław I General Johann Wilhelm von Vietinghoff (de) (Kingdom of France) Gabriel de Rochon de Lapeyrouse (POW) (fr) (Kingdom of France) Jean André, Marquis de Barailh (fr) (Kingdom of France) Count Plélo † (Swedish Empire) Baron von Stackelberg

Strength
12,000 initially 37,000 to 60,000 regulars totally	4,500 initially ~24,445 totally: 5 Crown regiments of the Polish army totally (at least 7,000); 7,500–8,500 Polish militia and volunteers; 1,279 Polish Guards militiamen; 2,150 Polish Guards cavalrymen; 2,400 French (Note: Sources differ on the number of French troops. The most common counts are between 1,200 and 1,800. 1,200 is a number of dragoons.); 130 or 200 Swedish volunteers

Casualties and losses
801 killed 1,753 wounded 12 missing 8,000 in total	Unknown, but the garrison capitulated.

The siege of Danzig of 1734 was the Russian encirclement (22 February – 30 June) and capture of the Polish city-port of Gdańsk, during the War of Polish Succession. It was the first time that troops of France and Russia had met as foes in the field.

== Background ==
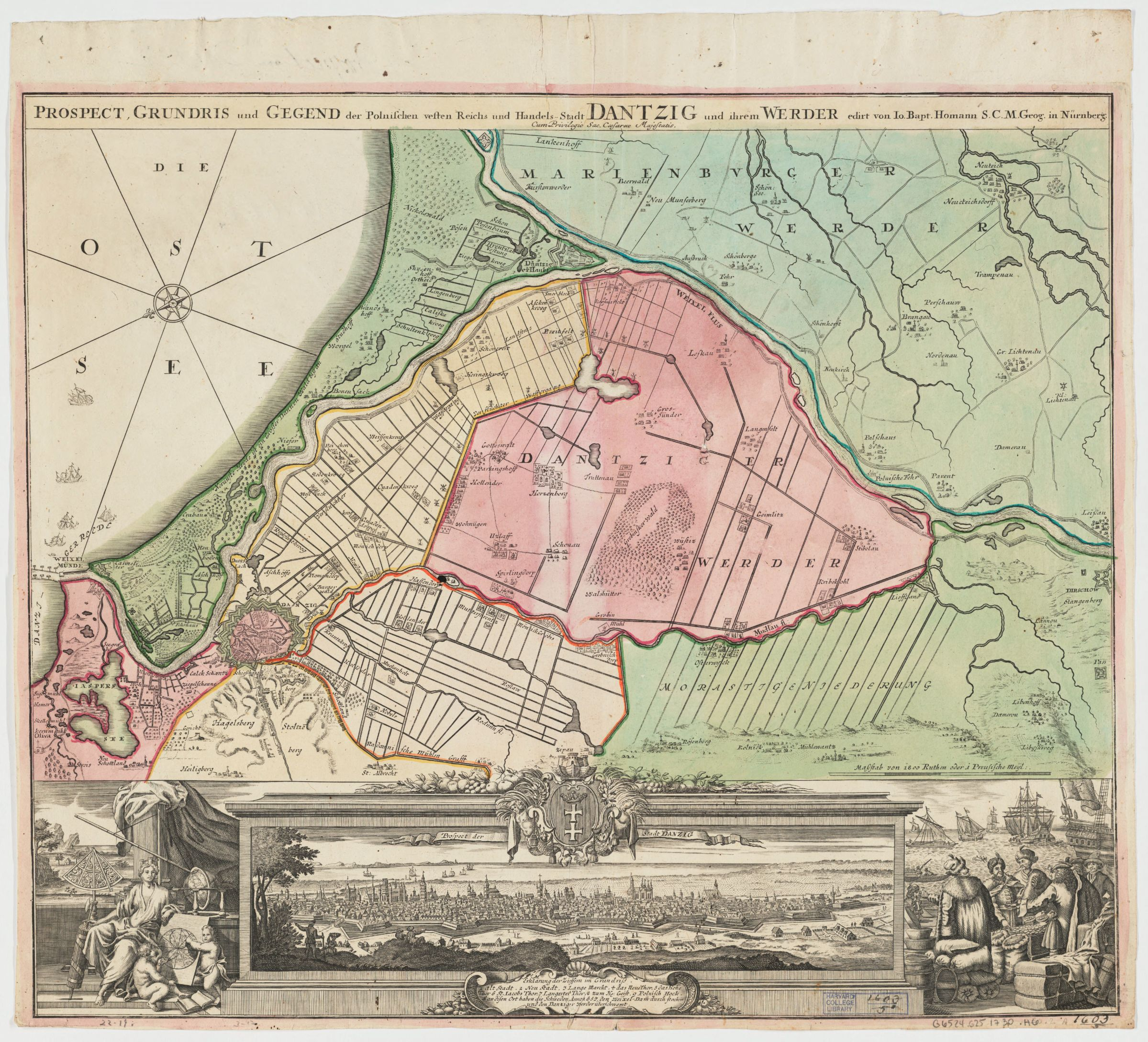
An early 18th-century map depicting Danzig and surrounding area

Augustus II of Saxony, who had also ruled as King of Poland for most of the years since 1697, died on 1 February 1733, sparking a struggle over his successor to the Polish throne. Stanisław I Leszczyński, who had briefly ruled as king during the Great Northern War (his reign was from 1705 to 1709), was elected king by an election sejm held on 10 September 1733, with broad support from the Polish nobility and population, as well as support from France (where his daughter was married to Louis XV), and Sweden (where Charles XII had supported him during his earlier reign). Russia, the Habsburgs, and Saxony, desiring a monarch over whom they would have more influence, opposed his election. Russia sent troops into Poland in August 1733, at first in an attempt to influence the election, but then forcing Stanisław, who had only 2,000 troops in Warsaw, to retreat to Gdańsk, where he entrenched with his partisans (including the Primate of Poland Teodor Potocki and the French and Swedish ministers) to await support that had been promised by France. On 30 September a Russian army of 20,000 under Peter Lacy arrived in Warsaw, and on 6 October a second sejm (composed of a smaller number of electors who had dissented from the previous election) proclaimed Augustus III king.

== Prelude ==
France, which had agreed to financially and militarily support Stanisław in his bid for the throne, was reluctant to send a fleet into the Baltic Sea since it was trying to avoid confrontations with Britain and the Dutch that might draw those neutral powers into the conflict. French funds made their way to Danzig in 1733 and were used by General von Bittinghofen, Danzig's military commander, to improve the city's defenses in anticipation of military action from Russia, Saxony, and Austria. In addition to 4,500 regular troops stationed in the city, a large number of Stanisław's supporters joined locally raised militia to bolster the city's defenses.

General Lacy, required to leave large garrisons to deal with Stanisław's partisan supporters, marched 12,000 men to Danzig, which he began to besiege on 22 February 1734. Due to the lack of proper siege equipment and the winter season, little siege activity took place at first, and the Russians had to deal with constant skirmishing from partisans both inside and outside their siege lines.

=== First French fleet ===
Cardinal de Fleury, Louis XV's chancellor, ordered a small fleet to the Baltic in support of Stanisław. Departing Brest on 31 August 1733, a fleet of fourteen ships (nine transports carrying 1,500 troops, and an escort of five frigates) arrived at Copenhagen on 20 September. The fleet was recalled before it became clear that Stanisław would need some sort of assistance, over the objections of France's ambassador to Denmark, Louis Robert Hyppolite de Bréhan, Count Plélo.

== Siege ==
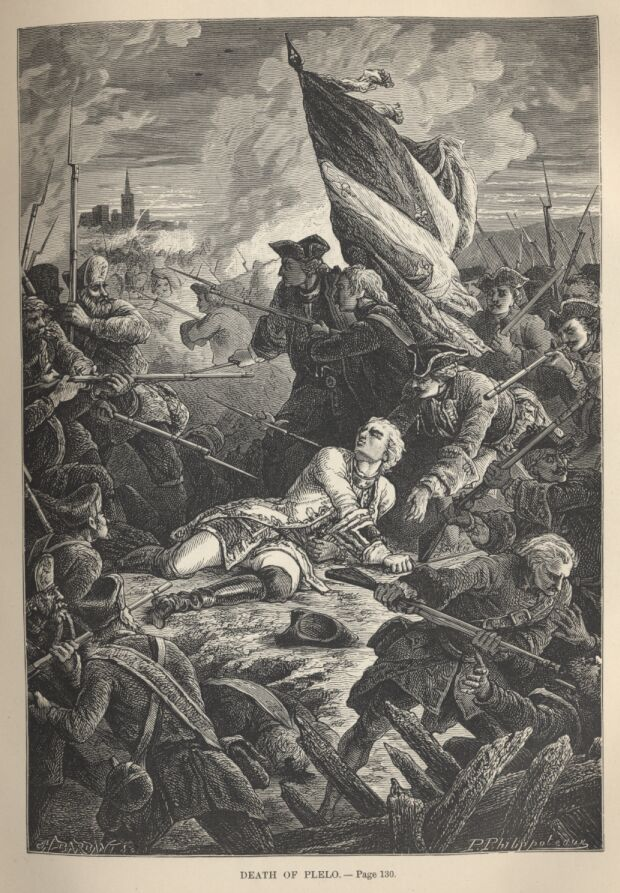
Engraving depicting the death of Count Plélo

On 17 March Marshal Münnich arrived with reinforcements – 15,000 soldiers (raising the total size of the besieging army to 60,000, according to some sources) – and took over command of the siege. The Russians made some advances, but were limited in their advances by inadequate artillery. Adam Tarło, a Stanisław supporter, led 8,000 men in an attempt to relieve the blockade; these were surprised by a detachment sent from the siege lines under Lacy near the town of Berent (present-day Kościerzyna) and repulsed. With the arrival of heavy artillery and 10,000 Saxons in May, the Russians captured Fort Sommerschanz at the mouth of the Vistula River, but were bloodily beaten back in an attempt to storm the Hagelburg.

=== Second French fleet ===
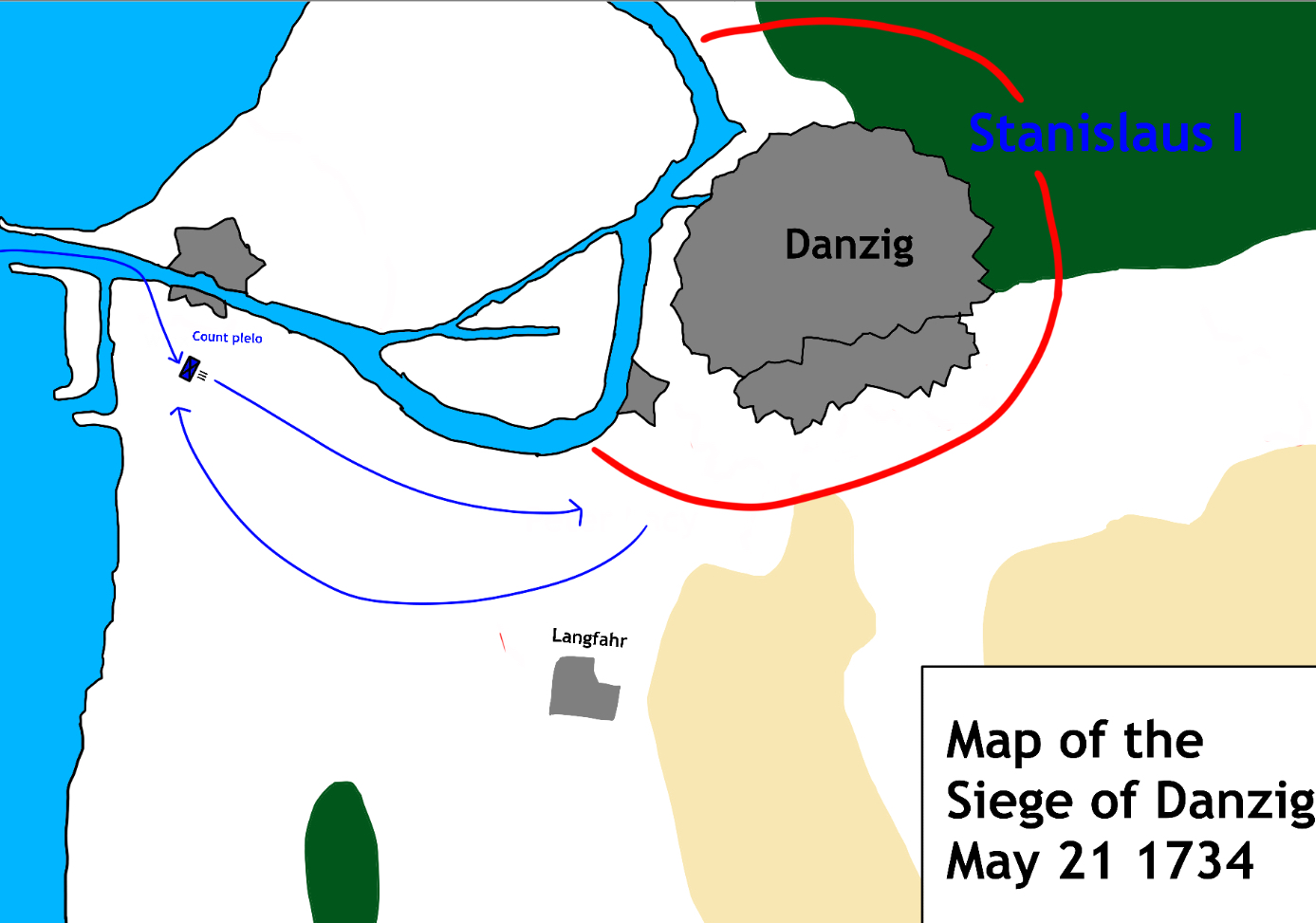
Attack of the Count Plelo’s forces on may 21

When it was learned in Paris that Stanisław was blockaded in Danzig in February 1734, a second relief fleet was organized. While Plélo requested fifteen to twenty thousand troops, at first only two ships (Achille and Gloire) under Commodore Barailh were sent with 1,800 men under Pérouse La Motte. These troops were landed at Weichselmünde on 11 May. Four days later, Pérouse La Motte abandoned the position, declaring it untenable, and returned to Copenhagen. There Count Plélo insisted that action be taken, and, reinforced by the arrival of three more ships (Fleuron, Brillant, and l'Astrée), the fleet returned to Danzig, landing the troops on 24 May. On 27 May, in the first recorded meeting of French and Russian troops, this force attempted to storm the Russian entrenchments, but failing to do so (the attempt costing Plélo his life), retreated to Weichselmünde. A Russian fleet under admiral Thomas Gordon arrived on 1 June, delivering additional siege weaponry; the fleet's guns so battered the French position that they surrendered, with Weichselmünde (and thereby control of Danzig's port) following two days later. Barailh returned to Copenhagen, but not before two of his fleet captured the Russian frigate Mittau; this ship was eventually exchanged for the captured French troops.

== Surrender ==
The autonomous city of Danzig capitulated unconditionally on 30 June, after sustaining a siege of 135 days, which cost the Russians 8,000 men. Danzig had suffered considerable damage and was also required to pay reparations to the victors.

Disguised as a peasant, Stanisław had contrived to escape two days before the city's surrender. He reappeared at the capital of Prussia, Königsberg, whence he issued a manifesto to his partisans which resulted in the formation of a confederation on his behalf, and the dispatch of a Polish envoy to Paris to urge France to invade Saxony with at least 40,000 men. In Galicia, Count Nicholas Potocki hoped to support Stanisław by joining up with a force of some 50,000 guerillas operating in the countryside around Danzig. However they were ultimately scattered by the Russians, and France refused to send any additional support. Stanisław formally renounced his claim on 26 January 1736.

Following the surrender, some of the Russian forces were sent further west to assist Austria in the defense of the empire against French military action in the Rhine River valley. Russian forces reached the Rhine for the first time, and helped to blunt further French military action in that theater.

== Notes ==
=== References ===
- The Cambridge Modern History
- Contemporary memoirs of Russia, from the year of 1727–1744
- Geschichte der Befestigungen und Belagerungen Danzigs, Carl Friccius (History of the Defenses and Sieges of Danzig)
- Die Belagerung der Stadt Danzig in 1734, K. Hoburg (The Siege of Danzig in 1734)
- Georges Lacour-Gayet (1902), La marine militaire de la France sous le règne de Louis XV (Military navy of France under the reign of Louis XV)
