= The Crock of Gold (novel) =

1912 novel by James Stephens

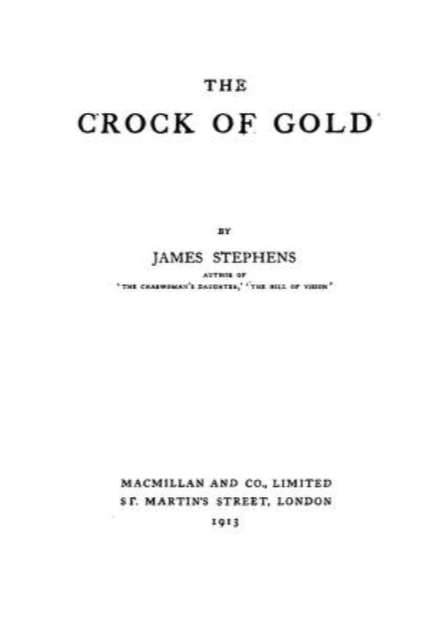
- Title page for The Crock of Gold
- Author: James Stephens
- Genre: Comic novel
- Publisher: Macmillan & Company
- Publication date: 1912
- Pages: 311

The Crock of Gold is a comic novel written by Irish author James Stephens, first published in 1912.

== Summary ==
The novel is a mixture of philosophy, the supernatural, Irish folklore, and the "battle of the sexes". It consists of six books:

- Book I – The Coming of Pan
- Book II – The Philosopher's Journey
- Book III – The Two Gods
- Book IV – The Philosopher's Return
- Book V – The Policemen
- Book VI – The Thin Woman's Journey

The story centers on an old Philosopher and his quest to save the most beautiful woman in the world, Cáitilin Ni Murrachu, a farmer's daughter who has been seduced by the Greek god Pan.

Initially, there are two old Philosophers, who live with their wives in a house in a dark pinewood forest. One of the Philosophers becomes depressed because he has learned all that he is capable of learning, and he kills himself. His grieving wife kills herself also. They are buried under the house. The remaining Philosopher is then whisked away by his wife, the Thin Woman of Inis Magrath (who belongs to the powerful Shee of Ireland). The Philosopher and the Thin Woman encounter notable characters on their separate journeys, in his case the Irish god Angus Óg, and in hers the Three Infinites.

The Leprechauns of Gort na Clocha Mora discover their Crock of Gold has been taken. In a pique of anger, they inform the police that there are two bodies buried under the Philosopher's house, with the implication that they were murdered. Stephens writes: "It is in circumstances such as these that dangerous alliances are made, and, for the first time in history, the elemental beings invoked bourgeois assistance." The police arrest and imprison the Philosopher.

Many passages in the novel demonstrate Stephens' eye for detail and his whimsical tone. For example, an encounter in Book II between a donkey and a spider is described as follows:

"Does anybody ever kick you in the nose?" said the ass to him.
"Ay does there," said the spider; "you and your like that are always walking on me, or lying down on me, or running over me with the wheels of a cart."
"Well, why don't you stay on the wall?" said the ass.
"Sure, my wife is there," replied the spider.
"What's the harm in that?" said the ass.
"She'd eat me," said the spider, "and, anyhow, the competition on the wall is dreadful, and the flies are getting wiser and timider every season. Have you got a wife yourself, now?"
"I have not," said the ass; "I wish I had."
"You like your wife for the first while," said the spider, "and after that you hate her."
"If I had the first while I'd chance the second while," replied the ass.
"It's bachelor's talk," said the spider; "all the same, we can't keep away from them," and so saying he began to move all his legs at once in the direction of the wall. "You can only die once," said he.
"If your wife was an ass she wouldn't eat you," said the ass.
"She'd be doing something else then," replied the spider, and he climbed up the wall.

The Philosopher's children chance upon the missing Crock of Gold, and return it to the Leprechauns. Caitilin is finally persuaded to leave Pan, and Angus Óg helps to rescue the Philosopher from wrongful imprisonment.

== Later editions ==
A 1922 edition, also published by Macmillan & Company, was issued with fanciful drawings by American artist Wilfred Jones (1888–1968). A 1926 edition featured illustrations by Thomas Mackenzie. In the mid-1930s, American publisher George Macy asked Arthur Rackham to illustrate a new edition of The Crock of Gold, but Rackham died in 1939 before he could complete the project. A mass-market paperback edition, published in 1953 by Pan Books, included a Foreword by Walter de la Mare.

== Reviews and assessments ==
- Bleiler, Everett F. (1983). The Guide to Supernatural Fiction. Kent, Ohio: Kent State University Press. p. 472. LCCN 82-25477.
- Finneran, Richard J. (1978). The Olympian and the Leprechaun: W. B. Yeats and James Stephens. Dublin: Dolmen Press. ISBN 978-0851053387.
- Kiely, Benedict (1999). "Clay and Gods and Men: The Worlds of James Stephens". A Raid into Dark Corners and Other Essays. Cork, Ireland: Cork University Press. ISBN 978-1859182352.
- Kullman, Thomas (1996). "Irish Mythology, Eastern Philosophy, and Literary Modernism in James Stephens' The Crock of Gold". In Massoud, Mary (ed.). Literary Inter-Relations: Ireland, Egypt, and the Far East. Colin Smythe Ltd. ISBN 978-0861403776.
- Langford, David (December 1986). "Critical Mass". White Dwarf. No. 84. Games Workshop. p. 8. "Bag this for your shelf of fantasy classics: it may go out of print for further decades."
- Lennon, Joseph (2004). "Theosophy and the Nation: George Russell (Æ) and James Stephens". Irish Orientalism: A Literary and Intellectual History. Syracuse, New York: Syracuse University Press. ISBN 978-0815630449.
- Martin, Augustine (1977). James Stephens: A Critical Study. Totowa, New Jersey: Rowman & Littlefield. ISBN 978-0874719680.
- McFate, Patricia (1979). The Writings of James Stephens: Variations on a Theme of Love. New York: Macmillan Press. ISBN 978-0333246993.
- Quintelli-Neary, Marguerite (1997). "James Stephens: The Crock of Gold and The Demi-Gods". Folklore and the Fantastic in Twelve Modern Irish Novels. Westport, Connecticut: Greenwood Press. ISBN 978-0313304903.
