= Peter McKenzie =

Peter McKenzie may refer to:

- Peter McKenzie (actor) (active 1982–2009), New Zealand actor
- Peter McKenzie (conservationist) (1952–2012), New Zealand conservationist
- Peter H. McKenzie (1845–1929), Canadian politician

== See also ==
- Peter Mackenzie (born 1961), American actor
