= Donald MacKenzie (archer) =

American archer

Medal record

Men's Archery

Representing United States

World Championships
Gold medal – first place	1933 London	Individual

Donald MacKenzie was a former World Champion archer who represented the United States.

== Career ==
MacKenzie was the first non-European to compete at the World Archery Championships in 1933 at the Ranelagh Club, London, when he won the event, drawing attention and admiration with his unique style. He did not defend his world title (United States archers did not regularly compete at the World Archery Championships until after the Second World War, and first sent a full team in 1957), but remained an influential and successful competitor at national competitions.
