= Anne MacKenzie =

Anne or Anne Mackenzie may refer to:

- Anne Mackenzie (writer) (1818–1877), British writer
- Anne Mackenzie-Stuart (1930–2008), Scottish political activist
- Anne Mackenzie (politician) (born 1946/47), American politician
- Anne MacKenzie (journalist) (born 1960), British television journalist
- Anne MacKenzie (judge) (active since 1990), Canadian judge in the province of British Columbia

== See also ==
- Anna Mackenzie (1621–1707), wife of Alexander Lindsay, 1st Earl of Balcarres and Archibald Campbell, 9th Earl of Argyll
- Anna Maria Mackenzie (fl. 1783–1811), British novelist
- Anna Mackenzie (writer) (born 1963), New Zealand writer
