= Cameron Mackenzie =

Cameron Mackenzie may refer to:

- Cameron Mackenzie (athlete)
- Cameron Mackenzie (politician)
- Cameron Mackenzie (footballer)
