= Norman MacKenzie =

Norman MacKenzie or Mackenzie may refer to:

- Norman MacKenzie (academic) (1894–1986), Canadian academic and senator
- Norman Mackenzie (conductor), conductor
- Norman Mackenzie (1869–1936), Canadian lawyer and arts patron whose collection became the Norman Mackenzie Art Gallery
- Norman MacKenzie (journalist) (1921–2013), British writer, journalist and educationalist
