= George McKenzie (footballer, born 1908) =

Scottish footballer

Personal information
- Full name: George Duncan McKenzie
- Date of birth: 27 January 1908
- Place of birth: Portgordon, Scotland
- Date of death: December 1974 (aged 66)
- Place of death: Bolton, England
- Position: Outside left

Senior career*
Years	Team	Apps	(Gls)
–1928	Buckie Thistle		
1928–1929	Aberdeen University		
1929–1933	Queen's Park	104	(15)
1933–1934	Hull City	9	(4)
1934	Stockport County	7	(3)
1934–1935	Macclesfield	5	(4)
1935–1936	Kells United		

International career
1930–1933	Scotland Amateurs	8	(2)
- * Club domestic league appearances and goals

George Duncan McKenzie (27 January 1908 – December 1974) was a Scottish amateur footballer who made over 100 appearances as an outside left in the Scottish League for Queen's Park. He represented Scotland at amateur level and also played club football in England.

== Personal life ==
McKenzie attended Aberdeen University and worked as a general practitioner, which influenced where he played football. After retiring from football in 1936, he moved to Bolton, where he continued to work as a general practitioner.
