= Bill McKenzie (footballer) =

Australian rules footballer

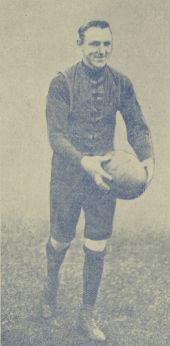

Personal information
- Full name: William Archibald McKenzie
- Born: 31 January 1889; South Melbourne, Victoria
- Died: 20 June 1983 (aged 94); Pagewood, New South Wales
- Position: Wing

Playing career^{1}
Years	Club	Games (Goals)
1909–15, 1919	Melbourne	112 (11)
- ^{1} Playing statistics correct to the end of 1919.

William Archibald McKenzie (31 January 1889 – 20 June 1983) was an Australian rules footballer who played with Melbourne in the Victorian Football League (VFL).
