= Archie McKenzie =

Scottish footballer

Personal information
- Full name: Archibald McNeil McKenzie
- Date of birth: 15 July 1878
- Place of birth: Bo'ness, Scotland
- Date of death: 20 April 1950 (aged 71)
- Place of death: Bo'ness, Scotland
- Height: 5 ft 7 in (1.70 m)
- Position: Full back

Senior career*
Years	Team	Apps	(Gls)
1903–1905	Bo'ness		
1905–1915	Partick Thistle	207	(1)
1906	→ Bo'ness (loan)		
- * Club domestic league appearances and goals

Archibald McNeil McKenzie (15 July 1878 – 20 April 1950) was a Scottish footballer who played as a full back, mainly for Partick Thistle where he spent a decade.

He began his career at hometown club Bo'ness, signing for Partick in April 1905; initially he had a back-up role, and spent time back at Bo'ness on loan, before becoming a regular in 1907 after Tom Harvey was forced to retire due to injury. McKenzie remained with the Jags until retiring in 1915; the club mostly finished towards the bottom of Scottish Football League Division One during that time, but did climb to fourth place in 1910–11 followed by fifth the following year. His importance to the club during that time had already been shown by the awarding of a benefit match against Rangers in the pre-season of 1910, though at that time he had only been a fixture in the side for three years. In October 1911 he came as close as he would get to a winner's medal when his side lost 1–0 to Rangers in the Glasgow Cup final. From 1913 onwards, the younger Willie Bulloch and Tom Adams began to be more favoured in the Thistle defence.

He played in two editions of the Glasgow FA's annual challenge match against Sheffield, in March 1908 then in October of the same year, and had a trial for the Scottish League XI in 1910.
