= Paul McKenzie =

Paul McKenzie, MacKenzie, or Mackenzie may refer to:

- Paul Mackenzie (physicist), American physicist
- Paul MacKenzie (physician), Scottish physician, soldier and sportsman
- Paul Mackenzie (cult leader), Kenyan leader of the Good News International Ministries and convicted mass murderer
- Paul McKenzie (rugby union) (born 1984), Irish rugby union player (Exeter Chiefs, Ireland 'A')
- Paul McKenzie (footballer, born 1964), Scottish football player (Partick Thistle, Falkirk FC, Hamilton Academical)
- Paul McKenzie (footballer, born 1969), Scottish football player (Burnley FC)
- Paul McKenzie (sailor), Australian Olympic sailor
- Paul McKenzie, member of the Canadian Celtic punk band The Real McKenzies
