= Kells United F.C. =

Kells United
- Full name: Kells United Football Club

Kells United F.C. was an English association football club.

== History ==
They reached the 1st round of the FA Cup in 1935, losing 0–4 to Stalybridge Celtic.

== Records ==
- Best FA Cup performance: 1st Round, 1935–36
