= Robert Grierson (missionary) =

Canadian doctor, missionary (1868–1965)

Robert G. Grierson
- Born: February 15, 1868; Halifax, Nova Scotia, Canada
- Died: May 8, 1965 (aged 97); York, Toronto, Canada
- Other name: 구례선
- Occupation: Medical missionary

Robert G. Grierson (February 15, 1868 – May 8, 1965) was a Canadian medical doctor, Presbyterian missionary, and educator who worked in Korea for thirty-six years. He is also known by his Korean name, 구례선 (Korean pronunciation: [kuɽje̞sʰʌ̹n]). Grierson performed his missionary works in the Sŏngjin and Hamhung area. He established the Sŏngjin clinic which later expanded to Jedong hospital and found the Bosin Boys' School and Eunjin Middle School. Grierson was known for his active participation in the Korean Independence Movement, posthumously receiving the Order of Merit for National Foundation Independence Medal in 1968 from the Korean government.

== Early life and education ==
Grierson was born on February 15, 1868, at Halifax, Nova Scotia, Canada to John Grierson and Mary Parrett. He received his Bachelor of Arts degree from the Dalhousie University in 1890, his theology degree from Pine Hill Divinity Hall in 1893, and his medical degree from Dalhousie Medical College in 1897. In 1898, he was ordained in Charlottetown, Prince Edward Island.

== Missionary Work ==
Being a reverend and a physician, Grierson carried out both evangelical and medical missionary works during his time in Korea. Grierson had multiple responsibilities as a reverend, school teacher, doctor, and missionary, and he was dissatisfied by the fact that he couldn't fully devote himself in spreading the Christian belief as a member of the Presbyterian Church in Canada. However, in 1912, Grierson changed his view on evangelism and fully devoted his time and effort on providing medical service to the people. He viewed medical practices as another form of the gospel message of love and compassion.

=== Call to Service ===
Grierson's decision to come to Korea was influenced by William McKenzie (missionary). Grierson aspired to work in Korea when McKenzie asked Grierson to help with his missionary work at Sorrai village during the early 1890s. McKenzie's death in 1895 prompted the Presbyterian Church in Canada to fund and send missionaries to Korea, and Grierson departed for Korea with Duncan MacRae and William Foote in July, 1898 arriving in September, 1898.

=== Early years ===
During the Council of Missions Holding the Presbyterian Form of Government of 1898, the American Presbyterian Mission Board yielded the Wonsan territory to the Canadian missionaries. Grierson joined Footes and MacRae at Wonsan in 1900, and the three began to expand their mission to Hamhung and Sŏngjin area.

In the early years, Grierson strived to finish the language instruction before any official medical and mission work by not taking in any patients. However, due to the great number of patients who needed medical attention, he began to care for patients: "We had scarcely time to get into the house we had rented when we were besieged by sick people ... so piteous and persistent were the calls for help that it did not seem humane to refuse; and very reluctantly study was almost entirely laid aside and medical and surgical work undertaken." Grierson also went on mission trips to rural communities lasting two weeks to a month and provided basic medical assistance.

In 1900, Grierson and MacRae headed north to explore newly designated territory. Upon receiving a telegram that stated that the Korean Court has ordered all governors and mayors to execute Christians and missionaries, the two cycled 240 miles in two days back to Wonsan to learn that the telegram had been forged.

=== Sŏngjin ===
In 1899, Sŏngjin became a treaty port, and foreigners could buy and own land in the Sŏngjin area. Grierson assumed responsibility of carrying out missionary work at Sŏngjin while MacRae and Dr. Kate McMillan, who joined in early 1901 through the Foreign Mission Committee, took on Hamhung territory. Grierson set the cornerstone for the missionary work by building a house and the Yongjung church. John Grierson, the father of Robert Grierson and a carpenter, traveled to Korea and helped his son with the construction of the buildings. He sold Bibles and Christian booklets in the library and had rooms where he could treat patients. During the Russo-Japanese war, Grierson took refuge at Wonsan, and Grierson's house was used as a barrack for the Russian officers, and the church as a stable. After the war, Grierson bought land next to the churchyard from a Korean landowner and built Sung-jun Church, Bosin Boys' School, and Sŏngjin clinic.

Grierson's missionary work was continuously impeded by the financial crisis of the Scottish church Foreign Mission Committee. In 1912, Grierson expressed his frustration to the board when he wrote the annual report for Sŏngjin: "This work [the medical work] can never be conducted satisfactorily while the doctor in charge is so immersed in church, school, administrative, class, theological, and other work; ... until we have a doctor with no other duties, we shall have a medical work only in name; and the medical work unsatisfactory as it is, will but limit the activities of the senior missionary in his other important spheres." In 1914, Grierson received $7,000 from the Board to build a modern hospital at Sŏngjin.

In 1917, he renovated the Sŏngjin clinic to Jedong Hospital, the most bona fide medical facility of the mission. Eight Korean doctors assisted Grierson at the Jedong Hospital, and among them, four were students of the Bosin Boys' School and executives of Sŏngjin Area YMCA. Jedong Hospital had over one hundred inpatients and 1,743 outpatients.

=== Vladivostok and Longjing ===
In 1903, Grierson headed to Vladivostok with John Grierson and Alexander F. Robb on a mission trip in response to the request of the National Bible Society of Scotland to spread the Bible. In 1906, Grierson established a chapel at Longjing with Sun-guk Hong (홍순국) who was both a translator and a Korean teacher for Grierson. In 1909, as more Koreans moved to Primorsky, Krai Grierson revisited Vladivostok and served as a teacher for the bible study class. Grierson believed that more mission branches were needed in the northern region; motivating the Presbyterian Church in Canada to establish additional branches at Hoeryong in 1912 and Longjing in 1913. They sent Archibald H. Barker and Donald A. McDonald as missionaries in response to Grierson's request.

== Involvement with the March 1st movement ==
During mid-February 1919, Hamhung centered student organizations began to plan for the Mansei demonstration. Grierson allowed the local independence leaders to use his house for the secret meetings since it was less likely for the Japanese police to unexpectedly search a foreigner's house. On March 9, Grierson climbed the bell tower of the Yongjung church and tolled the bell to encourage the Korean demonstrators who had been imprisoned by the Japanese police. On March 10, the Sŏngjin Mansei demonstration was carried out in front of the Jedong hospital with one thousand demonstrators. The independence leaders read the Korean Declaration of Independence and began the march. The Japanese army reacted by dispatching the cavalry and fire brigade to Sŏngjin and began to suppress the demonstration on March 11.

Grierson wrote, "quite early, a squad of Japanese firemen, armed with fire axes, and police armed with rifles, paraded up from their settlement to the quietly resting Korean villages ... beating, hacking, shooting. Soon casualties began to come into the hospital, adding to our usually heavy Monday clinic." Grierson treated the injured Korean demonstrators at the Jedong Hospital. Since the Jedong Hospital was owned by Grierson, extraterritoriality was imposed, and therefore, the Japanese police could not interfere with the treatment.

Grierson was later interrogated by the Japanese police for actively helping and participating in the Sŏngjin Mansei demonstration such as printing thirty thousand copies of the Korean Declaration of Independence.

== Legacy ==
Yongjung church and Bosin Boys' School played a crucial role in educating the Koreans at Sŏngjin. The Yongjung church members and teacher and student of the Bosin Boys' School actively participated in the Sŏngjin Mansei demonstration. The "Triangle of the Church, School, and Hospital" was established in the Sŏngjin area with students who received modern education becoming a local society leader as well as a missionary.

In 1968, Grierson received the Order of Merit for National Foundation Independence Medal for his contribution in the Korean Independence Movement.
