= William McKenzie (missionary) =

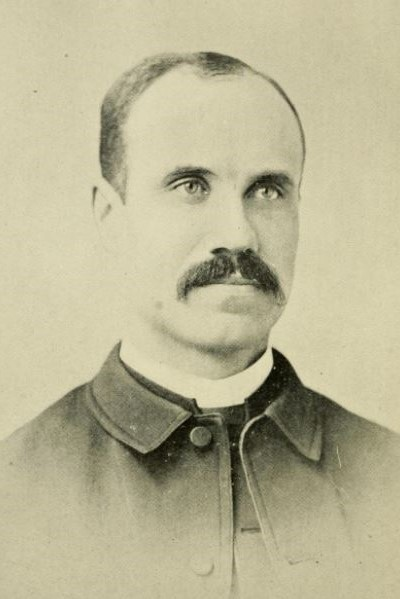
Rev. Wm. J. McKenzie

William John McKenzie (15 July 1861 – 23 June 1895) was a Canadian missionary to Korea. He was born at West Bay, western Cape Breton Island and studied at Pictou Academy, Dalhousie College, and the Presbyterian College in Halifax, Nova Scotia. He served as a missionary to Labrador in 1888–89, and was ordained as a minister of the Presbyterian Church of Canada in 1891.

McKenzie resolved to go to Korea as a missionary, but he was unable to obtain denominational support, so he went as an independent missionary. He arrived in Korea on 12 December 1893. He witnessed both the Donghak Peasant Revolution and the First Sino-Japanese War.

McKenzie worked in Songchon "completely isolated from Westerners... he dressed as a Korean scholar, ate only Korean food and set up residence in a Korean house, even sleeping on the traditional Korean ondol." McKenzie instilled a self-supporting spirit in the Korean Christians; Young-sik Yoo calls this "the most remarkable contribution McKenzie made to Korean mission history". He also started a school which taught boys and girls together, "an unheard practice in a Confucian society."

In June 1895, McKenzie became ill from sunstroke and typhus, and shot himself. Young-sik Yoo cites the American medical missionary, J. Hunter Wells:

About the first duty as a doctor I was called upon to perform was to investigate the suicide of Mr. McKenzie who was possessed of the erroneous idea of the appropriateness of isolation, exile, Korean food and so forth... when he shot himself he was a victim to the 'isolation-exile' theory.

McKenzie's suicide is often omitted in biographical descriptions. Elizabeth McCully's 1903 biography A Corn of Wheat makes no mention of it, but says:

Through that hard night and the Sabbath morning following, he fought bravely for life; but the release was near and the "good soldier of Jesus Christ" was done with his earthly battles. While Mr. Saw and the other Christians were at morning service and a young boy watched beside him, death came.

W. Hamish Ion suggests that McKenzie's death "became part of the mythology surrounding missionary work in Korea," and that to Presbyterians in the Maritimes, he had "died a martyr's death." Yoo notes that

His suicide in 1895, after less than two years in the field, prompted the Presbyterian Church Council of the Maritime to assume stricter control over the movement. From this time onwards, only "regular", i.e. officially-sanctioned, missionaries were dispatched to Korea. This change marked the formal beginning of organized Canadian Presbyterian mission work in Korea, which started in 1898.]

After Mckenzie's death, the Foreign Mission Committee (Eastern Division) sent William Foote, Robert Grierson, and Duncan MacRae to officially establish mission work in Korea.
