= Francis MacKenzie (disambiguation) =

Francis MacKenzie (born 1960) is former leader of the Nova Scotia Liberal Party.

Francis Mackenzie may also refer to:

- Francis Mackenzie, 1st Baron Seaforth (1754–1815), British politician and general
- Francis Wallace Mackenzie (1824–1892), member of parliament for Otago, New Zealand
- Francis Mackenzie (missionary) (1833–1895), Scottish member of the Plymouth Brethren
- Francis Mackenzie, 2nd Earl of Cromartie (1852–1893), British peer

== See also ==
- Frank Mackenzie Ross (1891–1971), Lieutenant Governor of British Columbia
