= Elizabeth MacKenzie (disambiguation) =

Elizabeth MacKenzie (born 1955) is a Canadian artist based in Vancouver.

Elizabeth McKenzie or Elizabeth MacKenzie may also refer to:

- Beth MacKenzie, (1960–2013), registered nurse and former politician on Prince Edward Island, Canada
- Elizabeth McKenzie, American author and editor
