= Thomas Gordon (Royal Scots Navy officer) =

Scottish naval officer (1658–1741)

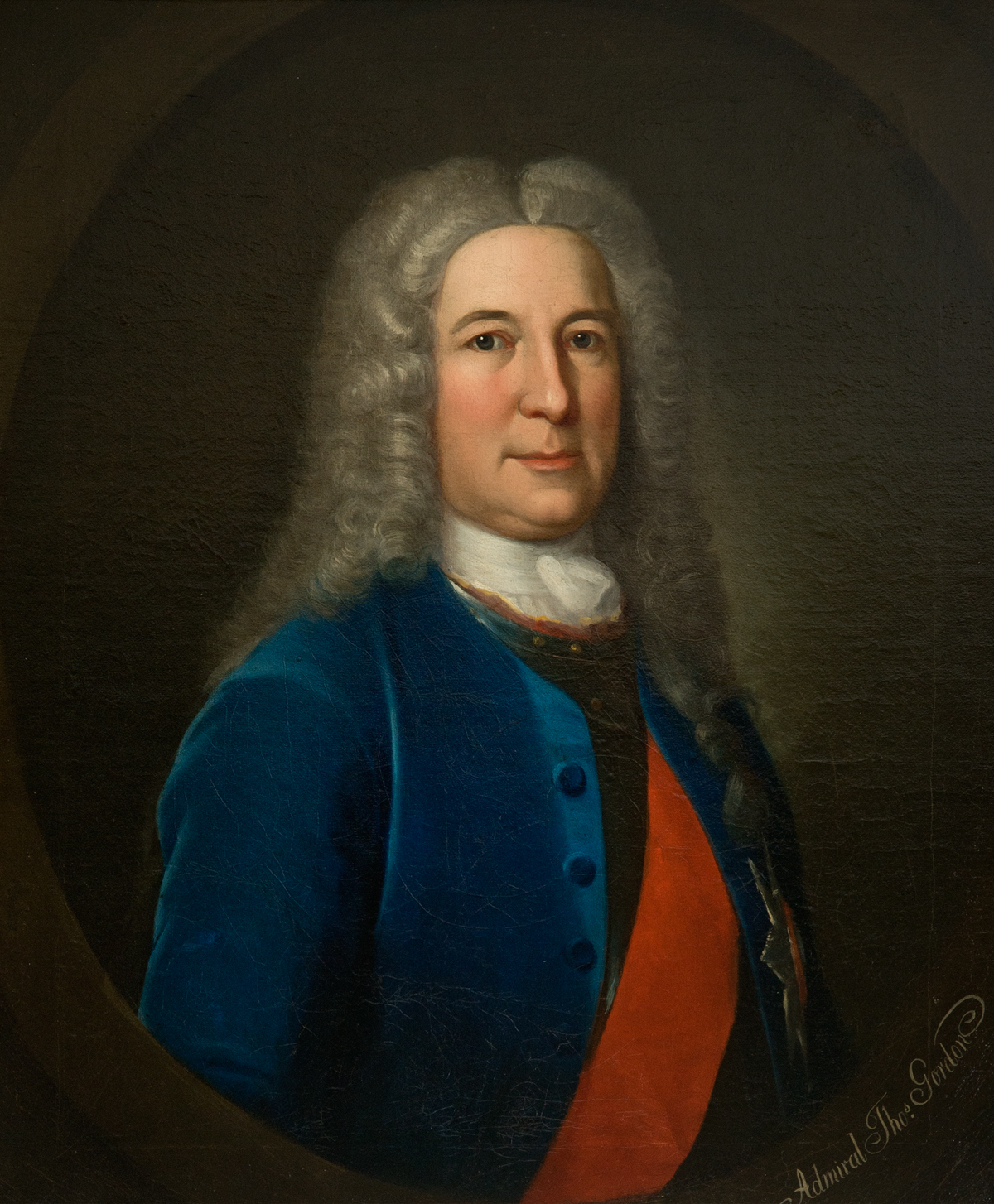
- Born: 1658; Aberdeen, Scotland
- Died: 18 March 1741 (aged 82–83); Kronstadt, Russia
- Military career
- Allegiance: Scotland; Great Britain; Russia
- Branch: Royal Scots Navy; Royal Navy; Imperial Russian Navy
- Service years: 1703–1714; 1717–1741
- Rank: Admiral
- Conflicts: War of the Spanish Succession; War of the Polish Succession; Siege of Danzig

Thomas Gordon (c. 1658 – 18 March 1741) was a Scottish naval officer who served in the Royal Scots Navy, Royal Navy and Imperial Russian Navy.

== Background ==
Gordon is believed to have been the son of Doctor Thomas Gordon and Jean Hay of Aberdeen, but his origins are uncertain. His date of birth may have been 1658, and he is believed to have owned property in Aberdeen of which town he was made an honorary burgess on 30 June 1736.

The official announcement was recorded as follows:

"Considering that the most illustrious gentleman, Thomas Gordon, Knight, Admiral in the Fleet of the Most Serene Empress of Russia, is a man of noble birth in this our kingdom of Scotland, being honourably descended from the ancient race of Gordons whose present chief is the most powerful Duke of Gordon; that he was from his early years a most worthy citizen of this city of Aberdeen; that this same brave man, when in the British navy, strenuously defended the commerce and ships of this city from pirates and enemies of every kind; and that he, being an account of his great valour deservedly promoted to the highest honours by the Empress of Russia, still befriends this city; we, in token of our gratitude and esteem, do approve and confirm the aforesaid most illustrious gentleman, Thomas Gordon, as a burgess of this burgh, with all the rights and privileges of a guild brother. Given under the private seal of this our city and signed in our name and by our appointment by Walter Cochran."

== Early career ==
He was captain of the merchant ship Margaret of Aberdeen in 1693 when he obtained an essential Mediterranean pass of safe conduct to go abroad to the Barbary States of Algiers, Tunis, and Tripoli. The account books of the Shipmaster's Society of Aberdeen show him operating from that port between 1688 and 1693 during which time he voyaged to Shetland, Sweden, Norway, and Holland.

== Scots Royal Navy ==
On 17 July 1703 Gordon received a regular commission as captain of the Royal Mary a vessel of the Royal Scots Navy. Royal Mary was being rigged out at Leith in order to protect the east coast of Scotland against privateers or warships of the enemy. In May the following year, the Royal Mary captured a French privateer, the "Fox" of Dunkirk, and took her to Leith where her crew were incarcerated in the tolbooths of Leith and the Canongate. The prisoners were given an allowance for their sustenance.

In August 1704 he captured a privateer ship named Marmedon of Dunkirk and also brought her into Leith where the crew were similarly treated as those of the previous French ship. Later in the year he captured two or three privateers and was considered to have ended that problem for the time being.

On 28 January 1705 Gordon captured a Dutch ship Catherine. This arrest caused great consternation in Holland and an appeal was written to Queen Anne pointing out that the owners of the vessel were blameless since they had passports to land their cargo of wine from the Canaries in Rotterdam. Trade with Spain and the Canaries was allowed by agreement between the two countries. The case went on for years but the vessel was sold at Leith in two weeks. Apparently she also had an illegal French passport and the ship's cook took revenge on the captain, who had had him beaten the previous day, by revealing this to Gordon. He also captured a small four-gun privateer, St. Esprit, from Ostend. After obtaining permission from the Admiralty to purchase the vessel he renamed her Little Gordon and sent her trading.

On 12 March 1705 Lieutenant George Ramsey with two sergeants, three corporals, and thirty-three soldiers were on board the Royal Mary for some two months whilst she cruised off the Scottish east coast. On 6 June the cruise was extended for another two months in the company of her sister ship Royal William. A record of the soldier's purpose on board is not known but possibly they were to be landed at places where Jacobites were at work. Due to the execution for piracy of Captain Thomas Green of the East India Company vessel Worcester and two of his officers at Leith in 1707, relationships were poor between the Scottish and English governments. Scotland's attempt to found a colony at Darien had failed, and when the expedition returned one of them, the Speedy Return, was found to be missing. Captain Green was accused by a Scottish mob of killing the crew and sinking the ship. He and his men were tried by the High Court of Admiralty of Scotland, found guilty, and executed on Leith Sands, despite a complete lack of valid evidence against them.

The ill-feeling between the two countries led Jacobites at the court of Louis XIV to enquire if the Old Pretender could claim his monarchy in Scotland at least. Colonel Nathaniel Hook, an Irishman and French spy, was landed at Slains Castle near Peterhead where he could be sure of a good welcome at the home of the Earl of Errol. He was then transferred to the Hay fortress at Delgatie Castle, near Turriff where he could meet with Jacobite leaders. Scots noblemen had promised twenty-five thousand Highlanders and five thousand horses.

Having been promoted to commodore on 7 March 1706 Gordon joined the Royal William, which sailed from Leith accompanied by the Royal Mary (Captain Hamilton). Their commission was to guard and convoy the shipping on the east coast of Scotland. However, faithful Captain Gordon was in capturing French and Ostend privateers, out of which he could make handsome awards of prize money, he was not averse to letting a French ship land Jabobite political agents at Slains Castle to visit the Countess of Errol. The Gordons and Errols, who were closely connected, played their part in Scottish history though not always on the monarch's side. There were fourteen signals agreed upon by Commodore Gordon and the captain of the French frigate Audacious, which brought over Hooke, whereby they could recognise each other.

== Union with England ==
Negotiations between Scotland and England for a union were going on at this time. Commodore Gordon intimated to the French that he would soon be obliged to quit the service since, when it came to Union, he could not see himself taking the oath of abjuration to repudiate the late King James Stewart as the legitimate claimant to the throne. If the King of France required his services, he would come to France along with his thirty two-gun frigate.

In 1706 Commodore Gordon complained that, whilst entering the port of Tynemouth Haven, after having received some damage to a mast in a gale, Captain Jones of the Royal Navy vessel Dunwich had fired a shot at him. After sending his lieutenant to the Dunwich to enquire why the shot had been fired, he learned that Scottish warships were forbidden from flying a broad pendant whilst in English waters. Gordon pointed out that English and Dutch vessels often flew a broad pendant in Scottish waters. Jones also complained when Gordon fired a morning and evening gun. Gordon and Jones wrote to their Lord High Admirals for instructions on the matter but the Act of Union, which required both vessels to fly the Union Jack, automatically rectified it.

When the Scottish navy merged with the Royal Navy there was some dispute over the seniority of the Scottish captains. It was finally agreed that their time would count from when they received their commissions as captains from Queen Anne. This meant that four years at sea did not count and the dispute continued for some time. The Scottish vessels were renamed Edinburgh and Glasgow since the English navy already had vessels named Royal William and Royal Mary. Ships under these names still operate in the Royal Navy today. A third Royal Scots Navy ship retained her name of Dumbarton Castle. Their absorption into the Royal Navy was unpopular with many Scottish sailors. One hundred of Gordon's men mutinied at Leith having got it into their heads that they would be sent to the West Indies or elsewhere outside of home waters. They were used to serving in Scottish and continental waters and just did not relish service abroad.

On 3 February 1708 Captain Gordon was posted to the Leopard (50 guns) and distinguished himself off Montrose when he was involved in a running fight between British ships under Admiral Sir George Byng and French ships under Admiral Forbin. Captain Gordon when off the Firth of Forth captured the French man of war 'Salisbury' that was the sole trophy of the fight. The rest of the French ships were scattered and did not arrive in Dunkirk until three weeks afterwards. Admiral Byng had been promoted to Admiral of the Blue and had been in control of the North Sea fleet to oppose any French ship that attempted to land the 'Pretender' at Burntisland and, it was believed, five thousand French troops. Admiral Byng had his critics and the question was raised that had Byng done all he could and for a while the threat of an enquiry was held over him. Fortunately the discontent subsided and Byng was given the freedom of the City of Edinburgh, and Parliament passed a vote of thanks to Prince George for his promptness. Unbeknown to the British, jealousy and disputes between the French officers had frittered away much valuable time. On the eve of his voyage, the royal guest became ill due to measles, contracted from his sister, so the attempt at landing him had been cancelled before they sailed. They no doubt still planned to land the troops.

On 10 August 1709 the Edinburgh ex-Royal William was deliberately sunk to become a breakwater at Harwich. She was described as a vessel of 364.5 tons with two decks and 32 guns carrying a crew of 145 men. The length of the gun deck was 99 feet (30 m), and she was 28 feet 8 inches (8.74 m) wide with a depth of 11 feet 2 inches (3.40 m). On 5 November 1709 Gordon was posted to the Moor. He joined her accompanied by his son William. On 6 May he took up command of the Advice. He refused to take an oath of abjuration to King George I when he came to the throne in 1714 and resigned his commission.

== Later career - Russian Navy ==
Upon leaving the Royal Navy, new opportunities opened up to Gordon and he went first to France to visit Queen Mary. There he met Captain Ogilvie and told him that indeed he was "the famous Captain Gordon". He had crossed the English Channel to Calais with Elizabeth Ogilvie (Ogilvie's cousin, or possibly wife) who was employed as a messenger between the Jacobites in England and France. She was known as the "Courier of Jupiter" and wrote from Calais the following letter to Ogilvie:

"I have a countryman of ours with me, who was pinned on me by our friends in London. I was ordered to put him into your hands, and I long for an opportunity to get him off my own. I don’t know if he was designed for my guide, but I find myself under a necessity of being his, for to take him out of his wooden world, he knows no more about travelling than a child of six. He is in a prodigious hurry to be at Dunkirk before Saturday. I wish to God he maybe soon wanted. He is in such haste that I was forced to go halves with him in hiring a packet boat at the rate of £5 on purpose to be almost “drounded,” or what was very near as extravagant a reason, to humour my fellow traveller, for we came over in so prodigious a storm that nothing but our light heads could have kept us from the bottom."

He joined the Russian Navy of Peter the Great on 1 June 1717 and remained a Russian officer until his death on 18 March 1741. Gordon, who was now considered as a refugee, was engaged by the Tsar in Holland along with Captain Saunders, who is described as an Englishman, Captain Hay and Captain-Lieutenants Urquhart and Serocoled; along with two land officers, all British. After Gordon arrived in Russia, the Jacobites saw an opportunity to interest the Tsar in their affairs. There were a number of letters sent to the Tsar for just this purpose: nine from Prince James (1721–30), two from the Earl of Mar (1716–1717), five from Captain Hay, and others.

Promotion was soon to come since there were old Russian Admirals retiring. There were also newly built ships to be manned. On New Year's Day Prince Aleksandr Danilovich Menshikov was promoted Rear Admiral of the White, Captain-Commodore Sievers made Rear Admiral of the Blue and Captain-Commodore Gordon Rear-Admiral of the Red. The Russian Fleet was divided into three sections after the system used by the British and the Dutch.

Regrettably there was jealousy between Rear Admiral Seivers and Gordon. Seivers had been born at Copenhagen and served the King of Denmark in his navy about the year 1708. Having been engaged by Peter the Great as captain, he was sometimes employed on board, sometimes in the yard, as Under-Equipage Master. He was reported as a man of excellent sense, general knowledge and very exact and methodical in his conduct. He was also able to speak and write most European tongues and was fluent in Russian. But he just could not stand Thomas Gordon. Seivers refused to suffer Rear Admiral Gordon to be present at discussions upon the executions of any orders even when required by the Tsar. He felt that Peter the Great esteemed Gordon before him and indeed the Tsar appointed Gordon to take charge of a fleet over his head on the strength of his having been a British officer and trained in a better navy than Sievers had. Unlike Seivers, Gordon could not speak Russian but was fluent in Dutch.

The rift between Gordon and Sievers climaxed on 14 July 1721 when, at a banquet commemorating the battle of 'Hango Head,' a violent quarrel broke out between the two men in the presence of the Tsar. Gordon complained about the Dane's behaviour towards him and pointed out that, as Seivers was responsible for the appointments of lieutenants and all inferiors, he was appointing the best officers and men to the Danish and Dutch commanders. The General-Admiral, Count Apraxin, did his best to justify the actions of Rear Admiral Sievers and maintained that Gordon had falsely accused him of partiality when dividing the officers and men. During his conversation he referred to Gordon as ‘your admiral’ to Peter the Great which was not well received. As Sievers was going to leave the Tsar's service at the end of the campaign, it was left like that. The next day Peter called the two admirals together and made them drink a glass of wine together hoping that this would end their bickering.

In 1726 Admiral Gordon took out a fleet to meet the powerful British fleet under Admiral Sir C. Wagner that had been sent to the Baltic Sea to anticipate or prevent any action of Russia as a party to the Treaty of Vienna. However, since Gordon had told Catherine I that action was hopeless, courtesies were exchanged instead of cannonballs. On 6 May 1727 he was promoted to admiral and in November he became chief commander of the port of Kronstadt, a position he held until he died there in 1741.

Gordon was in command of the Russian fleet that brought about the surrender of Danzig in 1734 (the Siege of Danzig). At that time the Russian Navy had grown in confidence and had been asserting the power of Russian ships in the Baltic. A claimant to the Polish throne, Stanisław Leszczyński, supported by King Louis XV of France, had been in hiding at Danzig. Eighteen hundred French soldiers had disembarked and a fleet lay at anchor nearby. The Russian Empress Anna ordered that Augustus III should be the new king of Poland. On 15 May it became necessary to supplement the fleet engaged at Danzig. Admiral Thomas Gordon sailed there with a squadron of fourteen battleships, five frigates, and several smaller vessels. Gordon had his flag on the 100-gun ship Peter I and II and arrived at Danzig on 1 June. The French finally failed to repulse the Russian army and navy and surrendered on 13 June. The dispute over, the Polish throne ended in favour of August III and Leszczyński quickly left Danzig, which was occupied by the Russian Army. This was to be Gordon's last battle and he finally took up the position as Governor of Kronstad (1). He knew the port of Danzig well since, apart from his times as a merchant seaman, he also escorted convoys of Scottish ships back to Scotland whilst in command of the Royal Mary. France had sent sixteen warships and three regiments to Leszczyński's aid, so it had been necessary for Russia to increase her attacking force, which she did by sending Gordon's ships. He flew his flag in the battleship Peter1 and 11 and commanded a fleet of fourteen battleships, five frigates, and several small vessels. He discharged guns for the 60,000 Russian and Saxon army at Pillau and then bombarded the fort of Weichselmünde and the French camp outside it. He captured a French frigate and a small vessel and recaptured three Russian vessels. His countryman Field Marshal Keith, writing from Javarof to congratulate Gordon on the Danzig expedition, said:

"All the Poles that I have seen assure me that the so sudden surrender of the town was entirely owing to appearance of the fleet which cut off all hopes of succours, and therefore they look on you, as the main instrument of the loss of their liberty, for that is their ordinary term for us who have been employed on this side of Poland."

== Family ==
The family name of the Admiral's wife is disputed with one source calling her a daughter of Sir Thomas Elphinstone of Calderwood whilst another names her as the daughter of Sir James Elphinstone of Logie, Aberdeenshire; however, in 1710 his wife was definitely Margaret Ross, widow of Mr. William Monypenny of the Pitmilly family. Margaret is believed to be the daughter of George Ross, 11th Lord Ross. She died before 1721–2 and was buried near the grave of the Tsar's sister.

Gordon had a son, previously mentioned as being with him on the Moor, and another may have been Thomas Gordon, merchant, who died at Saint Petersburg in 1806. There were three daughters, Anna, Mary and Jean; the former married Sir Henry Stirling of Ardoch. In 1726, Mary was married to William Elmsal also at St. Petersburg. Jean married John Young, whose daughter Ann Young married Lt. Thomas MacKenzie in 1738, two years after the latter joined the Russian Navy in 1736. They had a son born 1740 also named Thomas Mackenzie who rose to the rank of rear admiral in the Russian Navy and was the founder of the city of Sevastopol in 1783. On 9 July 1771 young Thomas MacKenzie was awarded the Knight of the Order of St. George IV Class for successfully navigating one of only two fire ships which contributed to the destruction of the Turkish Fleet during the Russo-Turkish war at the Battle of Chesma in July 1770.
