= Robert McKenzie (Scottish footballer) =

Scottish footballer

Personal information
- Full name: Robert Copeland McKenzie
- Place of birth: Scotland
- Position: Right half

Senior career*
Years	Team	Apps	(Gls)
1910–1911	Morton	17	(0)
1911–1912	Queen's Park	40	(2)
1912	Linfield		
1912–1913	Clyde		
1913	Rangers	0	(0)

International career
1910–1913	Ireland Amateurs	3	(0)
- * Club domestic league appearances and goals

Robert Copeland McKenzie was a Scottish amateur footballer who played in the Scottish League for Queen's Park as a right half. He was capped by Ireland at amateur level.

== Personal life ==
McKenzie served as a captain in the Royal Army Medical Corps during the First World War.
