= Thomas Mackenzie (illustrator) =

Thomas Mackenzie (1887 – 1944) was an English artist and illustrator.

== Life ==
Mackenzie was born in Bradford, West Riding of Yorkshire, England, and became an artist producing illustrations for books, and watercolours. His earliest commissioned works were for Ali Baba and Aladdin and illustrations for James Stephens's The Crock of Gold, Arthur Ransome's Aladdin and His Wonderful Lamp in Rhyme, Christine Chaundler's Arthur and His Knights and James Elroy Flecker's Hassan. He failed to make a career as a painter in France and died in 1944.

== Works ==
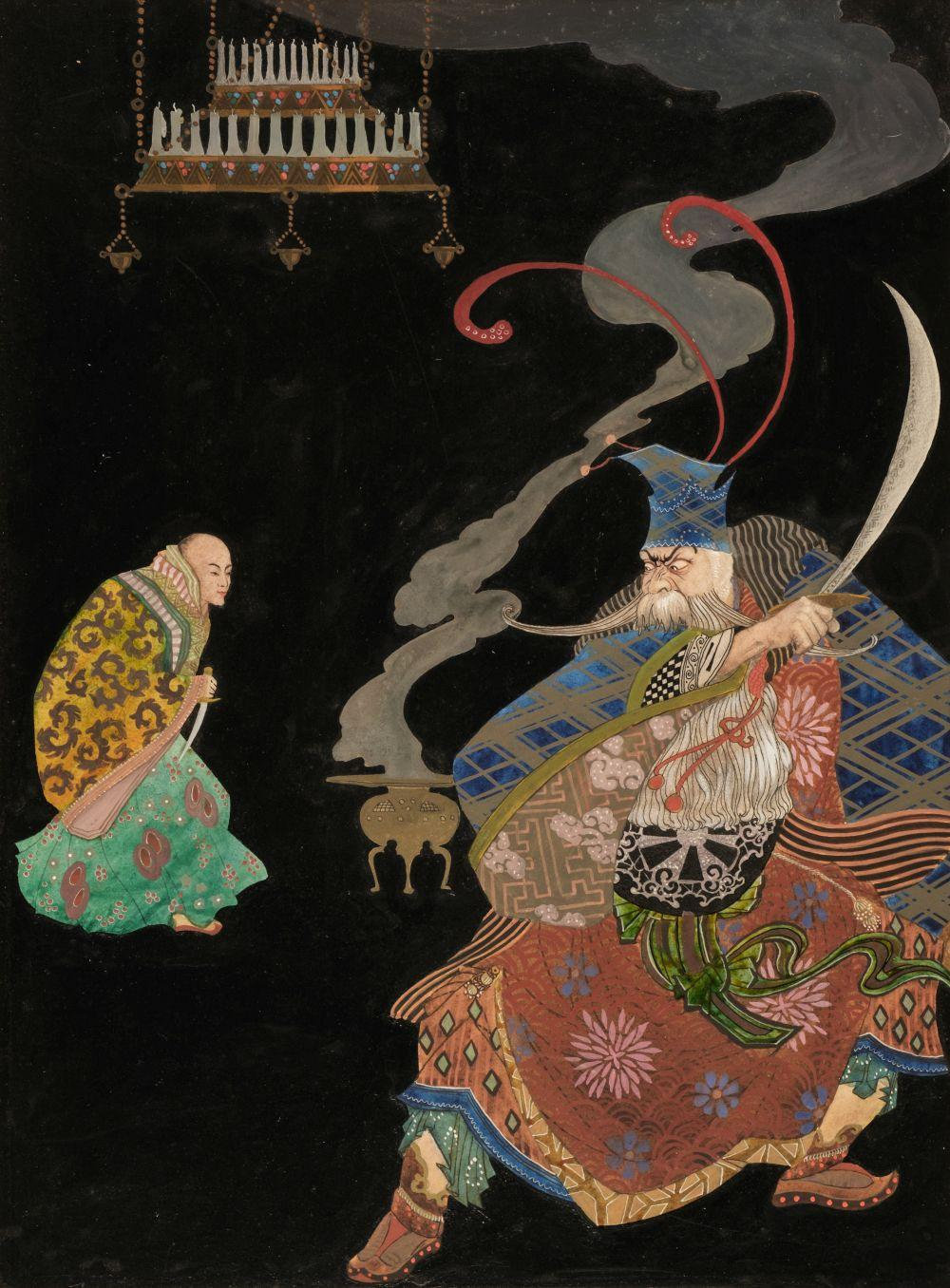
Thomas Mackenzie - Aladdin Fights with the Magician

Mackenzie's illustrations are reminiscent of the work of his Art Nouveau peers, including Aubrey Beardsley, Harry Clarke and Kay Nielsen. His images for Arthur and His Knights, in particular, are stylistically similar to those of Nielsen in East of the Sun and West of the Moon. Books illustrated included:

- James Stephens - The Crock of Gold (Macmillan, 1912)
- Arthur Ransome - Aladdin and His Wonderful Lamp in Rhyme (Nisbet, 1919)
- Christine Chaundler - Arthur and His Knights (Nisbet, 1920)
- Elizabeth Southwart - Bronte Moors and Villages from Thornton To Haworth (Bodley Head, 1923)
- James Elroy Flecker - Hassan (Heinemann, 1924)
