= Laurence MacKenzie =

Scottish footballer (1924–2010)

Personal information
- Full name: Matthew Laurence MacKenzie
- Date of birth: 7 July 1924
- Place of birth: Old Kilpatrick, Scotland
- Date of death: March 2010 (aged 85)
- Place of death: Sheffield, England
- Position: Wing half

Senior career*
Years	Team	Apps	(Gls)
1944–1945	Clydebank Athletic		
1945–1949	Sheffield Wednesday	6	(0)
1949–1951	Grimsby Town	58	(11)
- * Club domestic league appearances and goals

Matthew Laurence MacKenzie (7 July 1924 – March 2010) was a Scottish professional footballer who played as a wing half.
