= Robert Cameron Mackenzie =

Scottish thermoanalyst and clay mineralogist

Robert Cameron MacKenzie
- Born: 7 May 1920; Portmahomack, Scotland
- Died: 4 July 2000 (aged 80)
- Education: University of Edinburgh
- Scientific career
- Fields: Thermoanalyst and clay mineralogy
- Thesis: Thermal Decomposition of Hydrogen Peroxide Vapour (1944)

Robert Cameron Mackenzie (7 May 1920 – 4 July 2000) was a Scottish thermoanalyst and clay mineralogist who was instrumental in developing the Macaulay Institute for Soil Research in Aberdeen as a centre of excellence in soil mineralogy.

== Early life ==
Robert Cameron Mackenzie was born near Portmahomack, the only son of farmer, John Alexander Mackenzie. He was educated at the Tain Royal Academy and the University of Edinburgh where he graduated with a First Class Honours in Chemistry in 1942 followed by a PhD in 1944 for studies in the field of gas kinetics. In 1957 he was also awarded a DSc degree by Edinburgh University for contributions to clay mineralogy.

== Career ==
Following graduation he took up a post as a soil surveyor at Macaulay Institute where he spent his career until his retiral in 1983. In 1959 he was appointed as Head of the Department of Pedology where the Departments research activities focused on mineralogy and chemistry of soils in relation to soil properties and behaviour.

He published on a variety of clay mineralogical topics, including the mineralogy and chemistry of the smectitic minerals, iron and aluminium oxides in soils, the genesis of soil clays, as well as problems related to clay mineral classification and nomenclature.in the field of thermal analysis and clay mineralogy. He also edited The Differential Thermal Investigation of Clays and the two volume Differential thermal analysis

He played an active part in both national and international organisations. He was also an early member of the Clay Minerals group of the Mineralogical Society and served as chairman and Editor of the Group's journal Clay Mineral Bulletin.

During his career he received a number of prizes and was elected as a Fellow of the Royal Society of Edinburgh (1961) and the Royal Society of Chemistry and North American Thermal Analysis Society (1985), he was also appointed Distinguished Member of UK Clay Minerals Group (1983) and First Honorary Member of International Clay Technology Association (ICTA) (1988).

== Later life ==
After retiring from the Macaulay Institute in 1983 he remained scientifically active. For some years he continued research into thermal analysis in the Department of Chemistry in the University of Aberdeen and continued as a member of the editorial board of Clay Minerals until 1995.
