= Frank McKenzie (footballer) =

Scottish footballer

Personal information
- Full name: Frank McKenzie
- Date of birth: 10 December 1896
- Place of birth: Inverness, Scotland
- Position: Full-back

Senior career*
Years	Team	Apps	(Gls)
1913–1914	Cameron Highlanders F.C.		
1914–1915	Inverness Thistle		
1919–1924	Rotherham County	84	(4)
1924–1926	Newport County	65	(0)
1926–1927	Scunthorpe & Lindsey United		
1927–1928	Gainsborough Trinity		
1928	Newark Town		
Total		149	(4)
- * Club domestic league appearances and goals

Frank McKenzie (10 December 1896–unknown) was a Scottish footballer who played in the Football League for Newport County and Rotherham County.
