= Don McKenzie (footballer, born 1927) =

Scottish footballer (1927–1987)

Personal information
- Full name: Donald Cameron McKenzie
- Date of birth: 9 June 1927
- Place of birth: Glasgow, Scotland
- Date of death: 22 September 1987 (aged 60)
- Place of death: Strathendrick, Scotland
- Height: 5 ft 11 in (1.80 m)
- Position: Inside forward

Senior career*
Years	Team	Apps	(Gls)
1948–1949	Stonehouse Violet		
1949–1951	Rangers		
1951–1952	Grimsby Town	4	(0)
1952–1955	Arbroath		
1955–1956	Stirling Albion	7	(2)
Total		11	(2)
- * Club domestic league appearances and goals

Donald Cameron McKenzie (9 June 1927 – 22 September 1987) was a Scottish professional footballer who played as an inside forward.
