= George Mackenzie =

George Mackenzie may refer to:

== People ==
- George Mackenzie of Rosehaugh (1636–1691), Scottish lawyer
- George Mackenzie, 1st Earl of Cromartie (1630–1714), Scottish Secretary of State
- George Mackenzie, 2nd Earl of Seaforth (died 1651), Highland clan chief and Scottish nobleman
- George Mackenzie (died 1760) (c. 1662–1760), MP for Inverness Burghs, 1710–13
- Sir George Mackenzie, 4th Baronet (c. 1702–1748), MP for Cromarty, 1729–34
- George Mackenzie, 3rd Earl of Cromartie (c. 1703–1766), Scottish nobleman
- George Mackenzie (1741–1787), army officer at Great Siege of Gibraltar
- George Mackenzie (Royal Navy officer) (died 1780), British admiral
- Sir George Mackenzie, 7th Baronet (1780–1848), Scottish mineralogist
- George Henry Mackenzie (1837–1891), Scottish-American chess master
- George MacKenzie (wrestler) (1890–1956), British champion wrestler
- George K. MacKenzie (1910–1943), U.S. Navy officer
- George P. MacKenzie (1873–1953), former administrator for the Canadian Yukon
- George Sutherland Mackenzie (1844–1910), British businessman and explorer
- George Mackenzie, a nickname of professional baseball player Kenji Johjima (born 1975)

== Ships ==
- USS George K. MacKenzie, a Gearing-class destroyer of the United States Navy
