= Hector McKenzie (footballer) =

Scottish footballer

Personal information
- Full name: J. Hector McKenzie
- Place of birth: Scotland
- Position: Centre half

Senior career*
Years	Team	Apps	(Gls)
1911–1914	Queen's Park	89	(6)
- * Club domestic league appearances and goals

J. Hector McKenzie was a Scottish amateur footballer who played as a centre half in the Scottish League for Queen's Park. He captained the club and was appointed secretary in 1919.

== Personal life ==
McKenzie served as a sergeant in the Scottish Horse and then as a private in the Coldstream Guards during the First World War.
