= Thomas MacKenzie (Russian admiral) =

Thomas MacKenzie, also known as Foma Fomich Mekenzi (Russian: Фома́ Фоми́ч Меке́нзи, romanized: Foma Fomich Mekenzi; 29 February [O.S. 18 February] 1740 – 21 January [O.S. 10 January] 1786) was a Russian-Scottish rear admiral who founded the city of Sevastopol in service of the Russian Empire in 1783.

== Early life ==
Of Scottish Catholic origin, he was born in the spring of 1740, two years after his parents' marriage. He was the son of another Thomas MacKenzie (Russian: Фома Калинович Мекензи, romanized: Foma Kalinovich (Colin) Mekenzi) who was also a rear admiral in the service of Russia. His mother Ann MacKenzie (née Young) was the granddaughter of Admiral Thomas Gordon, Governor of Kronstadt.

Mackenzie entered into the Russian Navy in 1765 with the rank of midshipman, initially serving in the Baltic Sea. Later, with a rank of captain lieutenant, he took part in a number of battles in the Russo-Turkish War (1768–74), including the Battle of Nauplia (1770). He was wounded in the Battle of Chesma, where he served under Scottish-born Admiral Samuel Greig and commanded a fireship which contributed to the destruction of the Turkish fleet. On 9 July 1771 he was awarded the Order of St. George Fourth class. For distinction in this battle he was also promoted to captain of the second rank (equivalent to commander). On 21 April 1777 he was promoted to captain of the first rank (equivalent to captain).

== Sevastopol ==
On 28 June 1782 he was promoted to captain of major-general rank, and on 1 January 1783 to rear admiral in the Black Sea fleet. With a squadron of nine frigates and some smaller ships, he wintered in the practically uninhabited bay of Akhtiar on the Crimean peninsula. He cleared the shore of forests and founded the city of Sevastopol on 14 June [O.S. 3 June] 1783.

At MacKenzie's initiative the city was developed, with a shipyard, shops, hospital and church, as well as barracks and living quarters for officers. He worked to establish limestone quarries and developed the land to meet the supplies required by the wooden fleet, as well as food supplies.

He is considered the first commander-in-chief of the port of Sevastopol. The MacKenzie Hills (Мекензиевые горы) on the outskirts of the city are named in his honour, and he was given a farmstead there by Potemkin as a reward for his service. He had a house in the city where Empress Catherine the Great would once later stay.

Making the most of limited resources, he did not always observe formalities in achieving results, which served as a motive for accusations of misuse of treasury funds. This undermined his health, and he died in Sevastopol on 10 January 1786.

== Descendants ==
Thomas MacKenzie had a son born in England in 1781 to Maria Wady (or Wlady), named Thomas Henry Mackenzie, who became a Commander in the British Royal Navy.
