= Clan Gregor =

Highland Scottish clan

- Clann Ghriogair, na Griogalaich
- Crest: a lion's head erased Proper, crowned with an antique crown Or.
- Motto: 'S Rioghal mo dhream (Royal is my race)
- War cry: Àrd-Choille

Profile
- Region: Highland
- District: Argyll and Perthshire
- Plant badge: Scots pine
- Pipe music: Ruaig Ghlinne Freoine

Chief
- Sir Malcolm MacGregor of MacGregor
- The 7th Baronet of Lanrick and Balquhidder (An t-Ailpeineach Mòr)
- Seat: Boreland House
Clan branches
MacGregor of MacGregor (chiefs)
Greig (Russian nobility)
Allied clans
Clan Robertson
Clan MacFarlane
Clan Grant
Clan Lamont
Clan Tailyour
Rival clans
Clan Campbell
Clan Graham
Clan MacLaren
Clan Colquhoun
Clan Drummond
Clan MacThomas

Pronunciation
- Scottish Gaelic: Clann Ghriogair
- Pronunciation: [kʰl̪ˠãn̪ˠˈɣɾʲikɪɾʲ]
- Scottish Gaelic: Na Griogairich/Griogalaich
- Pronunciation: [nə ˈkɾʲikɪɾʲɪç/ˈkɾʲikəl̪ˠɪç]
- Scottish Gaelic: ’S rìoghail mo dhream
- Pronunciation: [sˈRiː.al mɔ ˈɣɾãũm]
- Scottish Gaelic: Àrd-choille
- Pronunciation: [ˈaːrˠt̪xɤʎə]
- Scottish Gaelic: Ruaig Ghlinne Freòine
- Pronunciation: [ˈrˠuəkʲ ɣlɪɲəˈfɾʲɔːɲə]
- Scottish Gaelic: An t-Ailpeineach Mòr
- Pronunciation: [ən̪ˠˈt̪ʰalbɛɲəx ˈmoːɾ]

Clan Gregor, also known as Clan MacGregor, is a Highland Scottish clan that claims an origin in the early 9th century. The clan's most famous member is Rob Roy MacGregor of the late 17th and early 18th centuries. The clan is also known to have been among the first families of Scotland to begin playing the bagpipes in the early 17th century.

== History ==
=== Origins of the clan ===
Clan Gregor held lands in Glen Orchy, Glenlochy and Glenstrae. According to Iain Moncreiffe the MacGregors were descended from an ancient Celtic royal family, through the Abbots of Glendochart. This is alluded to in the clan's motto: "Royal is my race". There is also a tradition that Gregor was the brother of Kenneth MacAlpin. Though there is little evidence to support this tradition, it is supported by the Scottish historian, William Skene. It is possible that the eponymous Gregor from whom the family derives may have been Griogair, son of Dungal, who was allegedly co-ruler of Alba.

Most modern historians agree that the first chief of Clan Gregor was Gregor of the golden bridles. His son was Iain Camm One eye, who succeeded as the second chief some time before 1390.

The barony of Loch Awe which included much of the MacGregor lands was granted to the chief of Clan Campbell by Robert the Bruce. The Campbells had already built Kilchurn Castle which controlled the gateway to the western Highlands and they harried the MacGregors who were forced to retire deeper into their lands until they were restricted to Glenstrae.

=== 16th century and clan conflicts ===
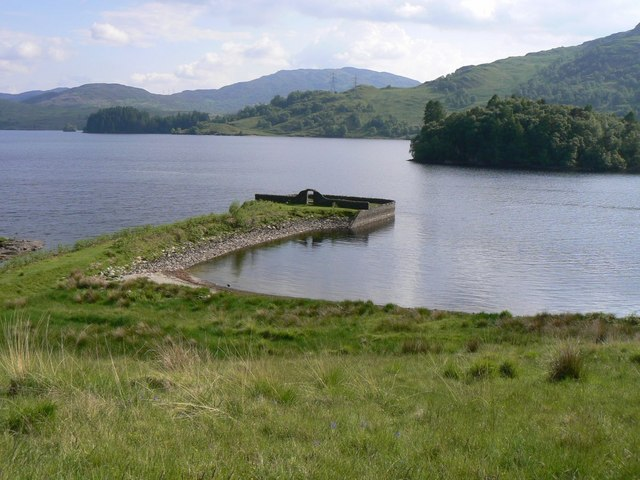
A Clan MacGregor burial ground.

Iain of Glenstrae died in 1519 with no direct heirs. He was the second of his house to be called the Black. The succession of Eian was supported by the Campbells, and he married a daughter of Sir Colin Campbell of Glenorchy. In 1547 Eian's son, Alistair, fought against the English at the Battle of Pinkie Cleugh but died shortly after.

Colin Campbell refused to recognise the claim of Gregor Roy MacGregor to the estates, and for ten years Gregor waged a war against the Campbells. He was an outlaw who raided cattle and sheltered in the high glens. However, in 1570, he was captured and murdered by the Campbells. The chiefship was claimed by his son, Alistair, but he was unable to stem the Campbell's persecution of his kinsmen, who over time became known as the Children of the Mist, a name associated with the MacGregors due to the extent of their losses.

Additionally, John Drummond of Clan Drummond was the king's forester and was subsequently killed after hanging a number of MacGregors for poaching. The chief took responsibility for the killing and it was condemned by the Privy Council.

=== 17th century, clan conflicts and civil war ===
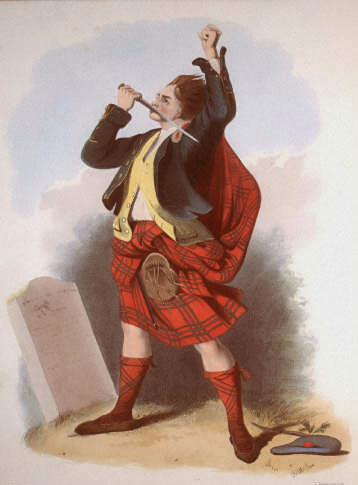
A Victorian-era, romanticised depiction of a member of the clan by R. R. McIan, from The Clans of the Scottish Highlands, 1845

In response to the execution of two MacGregor clansmen in 1603, Alasdair MacGregor marched into Colquhoun territory with a force of over 400 men.

The chief of Clan Colquhoun, in response, had been granted a royal commission to suppress the MacGregors. Colquhoun assembled a force of 500 foot and 300 cavalry and advanced to Glen Fruin to hunt down and pursue the Highland raiders. MacGregor split his force in two and while the main MacGregor force and the Colquhouns engaged in combat, the second MacGregor force attacked the Colquhouns from the rear. The Colquhouns were driven into the Moss of Auchingaich where their cavalry was useless, and over 200 Colquhouns were killed. At the end of the 18th century, in an act of good will, the chiefs of the two clans met and shook hands on the site of the former slaughter.

In April 1603, James VI of Scotland issued an edict that proclaimed the name of MacGregor as "altogidder abolisheed". This meant that anyone who bore the name must renounce it or suffer death. In 1604, MacGregor and eleven of his chieftains were hanged at Mercat Cross, Edinburgh. As a result, Clan Gregor was scattered, with many taking other names such as Murray or Grant. They were hunted like animals and flushed out of the heather by bloodhounds.

An Edinburgh burgess, Robert Birrel, who kept a diary of events at the time, described the episode thus (translated into modern English):

[MacGregor] was conveyed to Berwick by the Guard to conform to the Earl's promise: for he promised to put [MacGregor] out of Scottish ground. So [the Earl] kept a Highlandman's promise; in respect he sent the Guard to convey [MacGregor] out of Scottish ground: But they were not directed to part with [MacGregor], but to fetch him back again! The 18th January, at evening, he came again to Edinburgh; and upon the 20th day he was hanged at the Cross, and 11 of his friends and name, upon a gallows: Himself being Chief, he wes hanged his own height above the rest of his friends.

An act of the Scottish Parliament from 1617 stated: (translated into modern English):

It was ordained that the name of MacGregor should be altogether abolished, and that the whole persons of that clan should renounce their name and take them some other name, and that they nor none of their posterity should call themselves Gregor or MacGregor under pain of death .... [T]hat if any person or persons of the said clan who have already renounced their names or hereafter shall renounce and change their names; or if any of their children or posterity shall at any time hereafter assume or take to themselves the name of Gregor or MacGregor ... that every such person or persons assuming or taking to themselves the said name ... shall incur the pain of death, which pain shall be executed upon them without favour ....

Clan Gregor Act 1661
- Act of Parliament
- Parliament of Scotland
- Long title: Act in favors of the Clangregor.
- Citation: 1661 c. 195
- Territorial extent: Scotland

Dates
- Royal assent: 26 April 1661

Other legislation
- Repealed by: Justiciary Act 1693

Status: Repealed

Clan Lamont of Cowal defied this and provided aid and refuge for fleeing MacGregors in their lands in the wake of the persecution. Clan Chattan also protected Macgregors from the MacDonalds of Keppoch in Badenoch. Despite the savage treatment of the MacGregors, they had nevertheless fought for the king during the Scottish Civil War. Some 200 men of Clan Gregor fought for the Earl of Glencairn, in what was known as Glencairn's rising, against the Commonwealth. In recognition of this, Charles II of England repealed the proscription of the name by the Clan Gregor Act 1661 (c. 195), but William of Orange, after Charles's brother James VII was deposed, reimposed the proscription in 1693; it was to last until 1784.

=== 18th century and Jacobite risings ===
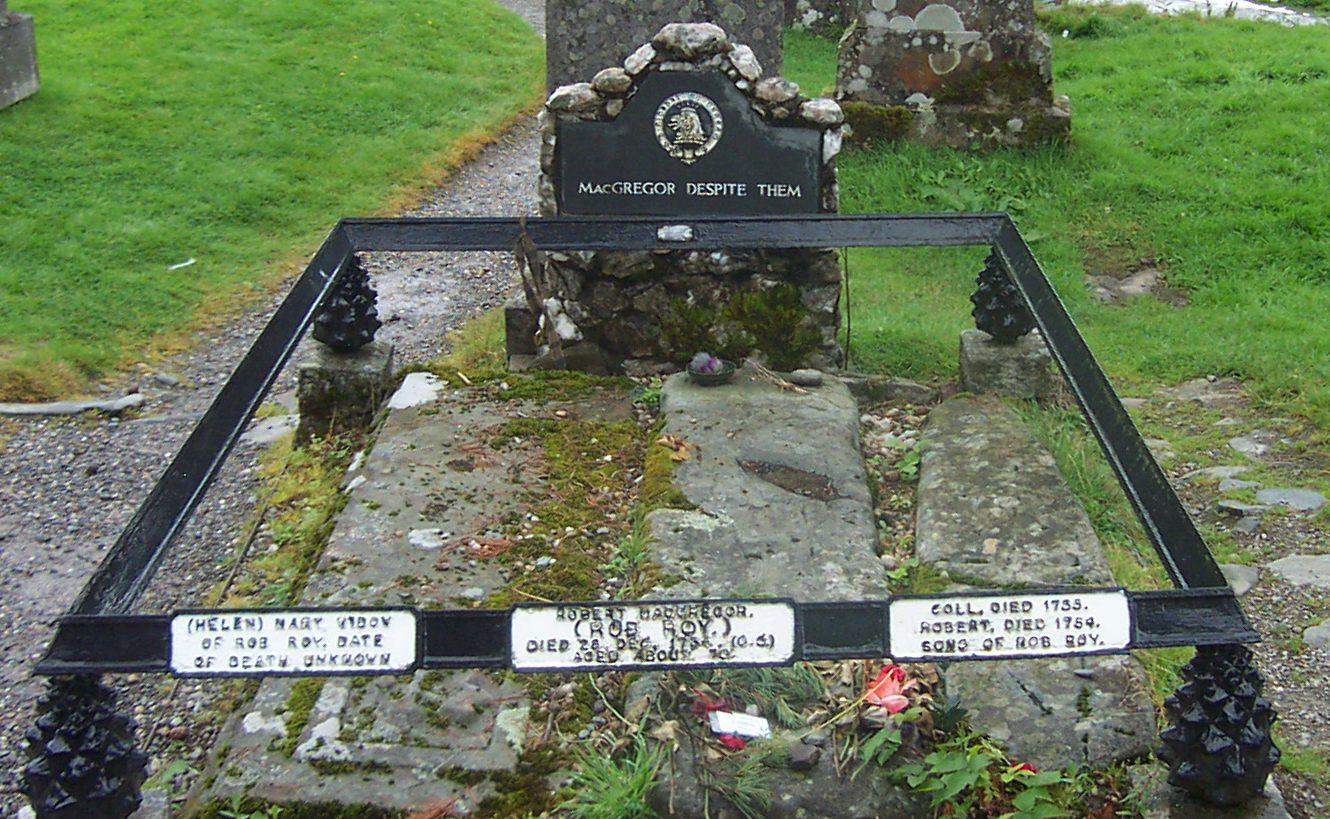
The graves of Rob Roy MacGregor, his widow, and their sons.

Rob Roy MacGregor was born in 1671, a younger son of MacGregor of Glengyle. (However, given the circumstances, he had been forced to assume his mother's surname of Campbell). The adventures of Rob Roy MacGregor have been immortalised and romanticised by Sir Walter Scott in his novel Rob Roy. Rob Roy was undoubtedly a thorn in the flesh of the government until he died in 1734. He supported the Jacobite cause in 1715 and after the Battle of Sheriffmuir he set out plundering at will. In one such raid on Dumbarton, the town was put into panic and Dumbarton Castle was forced to open fire with its cannon. He also led Clan Gregor at the Battle of Glen Shiel in 1719. He is buried in Balquhidder churchyard.

During the 1745 uprising, some of Clan Gregor fought at the Battle of Prestonpans with the Jacobite army under the Duke of Perth. Some of Clan Gregor were among the Jacobite force that was defeated at the Battle of Littleferry in 1746 in Sutherland, and therefore missed the Battle of Culloden that took place the next day and for which they would have been too late. After the rising, when the MacGregors were returning home, no-one ventured to interfere with them when they strode across Atholl, with their flying colours they strode passed Finlarig Castle where according to one source the Clan Campbell militia "durst not move more than pussies", and the MacGregors defying in broad daylight the outposts which Lord Campbell of Glenorchy had established in the passes.

Persecution of the MacGregors did not end until 1774, when the laws against them were repealed.

=== 19th century and restored clan ===
To restore pride in the clan, the chiefs needed to be re-established. Eight hundred and twenty six MacGregors subscribed to a petition declaring General John Murray of Lanrick to be the true chief. Murray was in fact a MacGregor who was descended from Duncan MacGregor of Ardchoille, who had died in 1552. His son was Sir Evan, who played a part in the visit of George IV to Scotland in 1822, where he and his clansmen were given the tremendous honour of guarding the Honours of Scotland, better known as the Scottish Regalia and the oldest set of crown jewels in the British Isles.

== Clan chief ==
The current chief of Clan Gregor is Sir Malcolm Gregor Charles MacGregor of MacGregor, 7th Baronet of Lanrick and Balquhidder, 24th Chief of Clan Gregor. His Gaelic designation is An t-Ailpeanach, a name which bears testimony to the clan's traditional descent from Siol Alpin.

== Clan badges ==
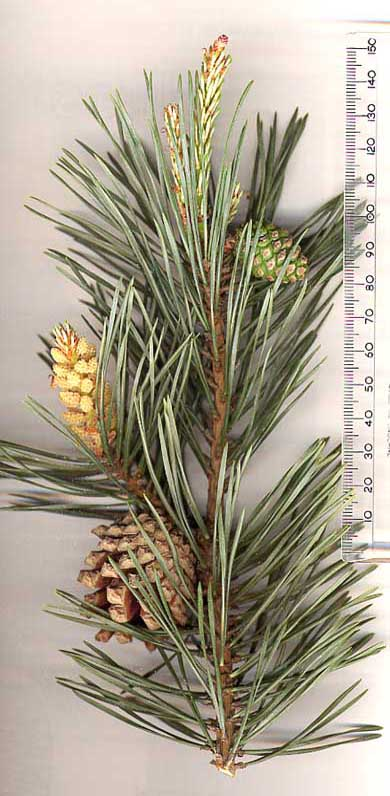
A shoot of Scots pine, the plant badge of Clan Gregor.

- Crest badge: suitable for any members of Clan Gregor to wear; consists of the chief's heraldic crest and slogan. The crest is: A lion's head erased Proper, crowned with an antique crown Or. The slogan is 'S rìoghail mo dhream, which is Scottish Gaelic for 'Royal is my race'.
- Plant badge: Scots pine, a conifer native to Scotland.

== Tartans ==
Many tartans are associated with the name MacGregor. However, only the following are recognised as "clan tartans" by the current chief of Clan Gregor:

Tartan image	Notes
	MacGregor Red and Green. A specimen of this tartan appears in the Cockburn Collection, dating from about 1810–1820, now in the Mitchell library in Glasgow. It is one of the tartans labelled in Cockburn's handwriting in 1815. It is titled as MacGregor Murray Tartan by Wilson in the Key pattern book of 1819. James Logan titled it simply as MacGregor in 1831.
	MacGregor Red and Black, also known as Rob Roy MacGregor, is the buffalo plaid of the US, associated there with the mythic lumberjack Paul Bunyan. This is one of the most primitive setts of tartan. According to tartan scholar Donald C. Stewart, it is probably the oldest "MacGregor" tartan, however it was only adopted by MacGregors at a relatively late date. A specimen of this tartan exists in the collection of the Highland Society of London. This piece is signed by, and bears the Seal of Arms of Sir John MacGregor Murray of MacGregor. This and other specimens of tartan kept in the collection were collected during 1815–1816, and are now kept in the Museum of Scotland, in Edinburgh. The clan chief states that any MacGregor may wear this tartan.
	MacGregor of Cardney. This tartan was designed in about 1930 by Alasdair MacGregor of Cardney, the younger brother of the 22nd chief of Clan Gregor, using his own vegetable dyes and wool from his sheep to produce a variation of the Red and Green, but in the same sett. Technically speaking it should only be worn by the MacGregors of Cardney, but that family is content for other MacGregors to wear it if they wish. It has been sold erroneously for many years as 'MacGregor Hunting'.
	MacGregor of Glengyle, also known as MacGregor of Deeside. A specimen of this tartan dates from about 1750. The clan chief states that the Glengyle branch of the clan, or MacGregors from Deeside, are entitled to wear this tartan.
	MacGregor Green. This is a dance tartan. The chief has approved this tartan only for Highland dancers who compete, or who have competed in competitions at Highland games. The chief states that MacGregors who are not highland dancers should not wear this tartan.

== Signet and seal in Iowa ==
Descendants of Rob Roy MacGregor settled around McGregor, Iowa, and in 1849 it was reported that the original MacGregor seal and signet was owned by Alex McGregor of Iowa. The clan seal was inscribed: "Triogal Ma Dh'ream / Een dhn bait spair nocht", which was interpreted as 'I am of royal descent/Slay and spare not'. (The first part is Scottish Gaelic; the second is rather dialectal Scots language, which today would be rendered "E'en do but spair nocht".) The signet was a bloodstone from Loch Lomond, and was sketched by William Williams.

== Septs ==
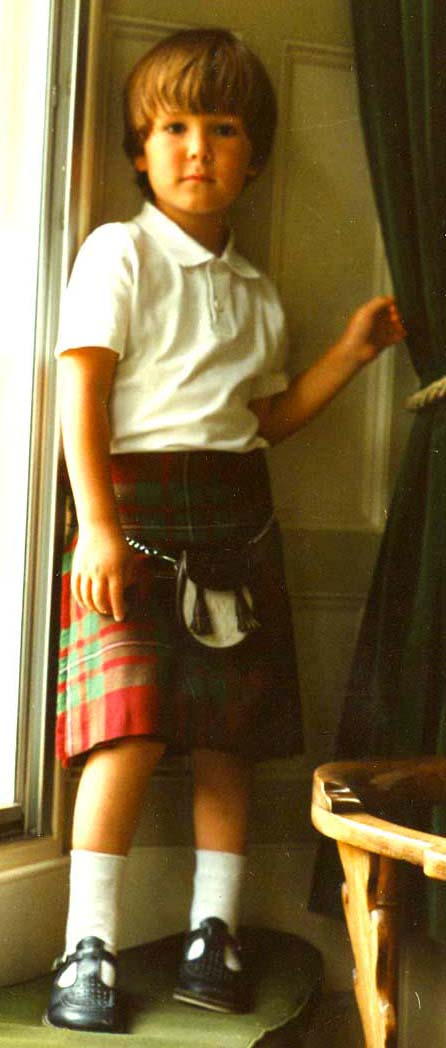
Boy wearing MacGregor of Cardney tartan

The following table lists clan names and sept names recognised by the Clan Gregor Society. The society states that people who bear the following surnames, or who descend from a woman with one of the following surnames, is eligible for membership. The prefixes M', Mc and Mac are considered interchangeable, and other spelling variations are also omitted from this list.

- Alpin
- Fletcher (Note: There is also a recognised Clan Fletcher.)
- Greer
- Gregg
- Graig
- Gregor
- Gregorson
- Gregory
- Gregson
- Greig
- Grewer
- Grier
- Grierson (Note: There is also a recognised Clan Grierson.)
- Grigg(s)
- Grigor
- Gruer
- Hubberd
- King
- Lawrence
- MacAdam (Note: There is also a recognised Clan Adam.)
- Macaldowie || Macara ||Macaree || MacChoiter
- McGehee
- MacConachie
- MacCrowther
- MacEan
- MacEwin
- MacGregor
- MacGrigor
- MacGrowther
- MacGruder
- Macilduy
- MacLeister
- MacLiver
- MacNee
- MacNeice
- MacNeish
- MacNie
- MacPeter(s)
- MacPetrie
- Magruder
- Malloch
- Neish
- Patullo/Pittillow
- Peter (Note: There is also a recognised Clan Peter.)
- Petrie
- Gragg

The following names are documented aliases of MacGregor from the proscription. Membership is available for individuals who can show evidence of descent or a family tradition of MacGregor connection.

- Bain
- Beachley
- Black
- Bowers
- Bowie
- Coleman
- Comrie
- Dochart
- Dunn
- Lakie
- Lakey
- Landless
- Lawrence
- Leckie
- Lockie
- Mor
- Roy
- Skinner
- White
- Whyte
- Willox

The following names are traditional aliases of MacGregor with little documented evidence. Membership is available for individuals who can show evidence of descent or a family tradition of MacGregor connection.

- Argyl
- Arrowsmith
- Begland
- Brewer
- Caird
- Callander
- Clark
- Craigdallie
- Crerar
- Crowther
- Denison
- Docherty
- Dorward
- Dowie
- Fisher
- Gair
- Goodsir
- Grayson
- Gudger
- Guinness
- Kirkwood
- Leishman
- MacAndrew
- MacAngus
- MacCanish
- MacGeach
- Macgehee
- Macghee
- MacGill
- MacGrew
- Macnocaird
- Macnucator
- Nelson
- Neilson
- Nucator
- Orr
- Paterson
- Peat
- Peterson
- Shankland
- Stringer
- Tainsh
- Telfer
- Telford
- Tossach
- Walker
- Weliver

The following names are other clan names that are known to have been used by the MacGregors. People with the names from this list are properly the domain of other Clan and Family societies, however the MacGregor clan welcomes inquiries from persons bearing these names who can show their descent from a MacGregor who adopted the name as an alias.

- Balfour
- Buchannan
- Campbell
- Cunningham
- Donald
- Dougal
- Douglas
- Drummond
- Erskine
- Ferguson
- Gordon
- Graham
- Grant
- Hay
- Johnson
- Johnston
- Livingston
- MacAlastair
- MacDonald
- MacDougal
- MacEwan
- MacFarlane
- MacIan
- MacInnes
- MacLaren
- MacNeil
- MacNicol
- MacPherson
- Menzies
- Murray
- Ramsay
- Stewart
- Stirling
- Williams
- Wilson

== See also ==
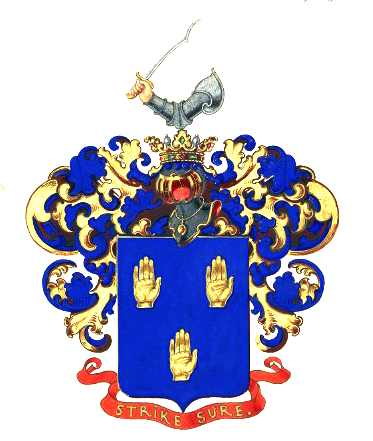
Coat of arms of the Russian family Greig

- Siol Alpin, clans traditionally thought to descend from the brood of Alpin and thus Cináed, the first accepted King of the Scots
- Greig (Russian nobility), Russian noble family of Scottish origin
- Edvard Grieg, Norwegian composer descended from the clan
- Greigia, a genus of the botanical family Bromeliaceae named after Samuel Greig in 1864 by Eduard August von Regel (a director of the St Petersburg Botanical Garden)
- Tulipa greigii, a species of tulip named by Regel after Samuel Greig due to Greig once being president of the Russian Horticultural Society
- Niau, an atoll in French Polynesia, also named Greig after Aleksey Greig by Russian admiral Fabian Gottlieb von Bellingshausen in 1820
