= Clan Tailyour =

Scottish clan

- Macintaylor
- Crest: A hand holding a passion cross Gules
- Motto: In Cruce Salus (Salvation from the cross)
- Clan Tailyour no longer has a chief, and is an armigerous clan
- Historic seat: Kirktonhill Castle
Allied clans
Clan Gregor

Clan Tailyour, also known as Clan Taylor, is a Scottish clan. The clan is recognized by the Lord Lyon King of Arms but it does not currently have a clan chief therefore it is considered an armigerous clan. The surname Taylor is also considered a sept of the Clan Cameron of the Scottish Highlands who are descendants of Taillear Dubh na Tuaighe (b.1550), see: Taylor sept.

== History ==
=== Origins of the clan ===
Stem arms of Clan Tailyour clansmen

Crest of the Chief of Clan Tailyour (in abeyance)

Scottish Clan & Family Encyclopedia. 1994.

Arms of the Chief of Clan Tailyour (in abeyance)

Scottish Clan & Family Encyclopedia. 1994. The surname Tailyour is derived from the French tailler which means to cut. In Latin it is rendered as cissor. In around 1137 Walter Cissor received a grant of land from David I of Scotland. The historian George Fraser Black states that Taylor is a very common name in early Scots records. In 1276 Alexander le Taillur is listed as valet to Alexander III of Scotland.

=== Wars of Scottish Independence ===
In 1296 Bryce le Taillur was one of the Scottish prisoners at the capture of Dunbar Castle. In the same year six people of this name appear on the Ragman Rolls, rendering homage to Edward I of England, from counties as far apart as Angus and Roxburgh.

=== 15th, 16th 17th and 18th centuries ===
In the Latin form of then name Cissor, both Donald Cissor and Bricius Cissor were witnesses to a deed in Inverness in 1462. In around 1552 Gillepatrick Tailzeour was sergeant of Dornoch. The name is also found rendered as Macintaylor and in 1613 several Macintaylors were fined for sheltering outlawed members of the Clan Gregor.

James Taylor, born 1753 in Lanarkshire is credited with the first practical application of steam power to vessels for inland navigation. The great paddle steamers which would later carry passengers and freight on the rivers of North America were derived from Taylor's original work.

== Castles ==
Kirktonhill is situated within Aberdeenshire, some four and a half miles (7.2 km) north of Montrose, Angus, and lies directly east of the village of Marykirk. A castle at Kirktonhill had been held from the 18th century by the Taylors, who had made money from sugar plantations in Jamaica. This was replaced by Kirktonhill House, a mansion that itself was demolished in the 1960s. Nearby is Kirktonhill Tower, a three-story folly.

== See also ==
- Scottish clan
- Taillear Dubh na Tuaighe
- Taylor sept
