= Seydi Ali =

Seydi Ali may refer to:

- Seydi Ali Reis (1498–1563), Ottoman admiral
- Trabluslu Ali Pasha (died 1804), Ottoman governor of Egypt, also known as Seydi Ali Pasha
- Seydi Ali Pasha (died 1821), Ottoman Kapudan Pasha (grand admiral)
