= Aleksey Greig =

Russian admiral (1775–1845)

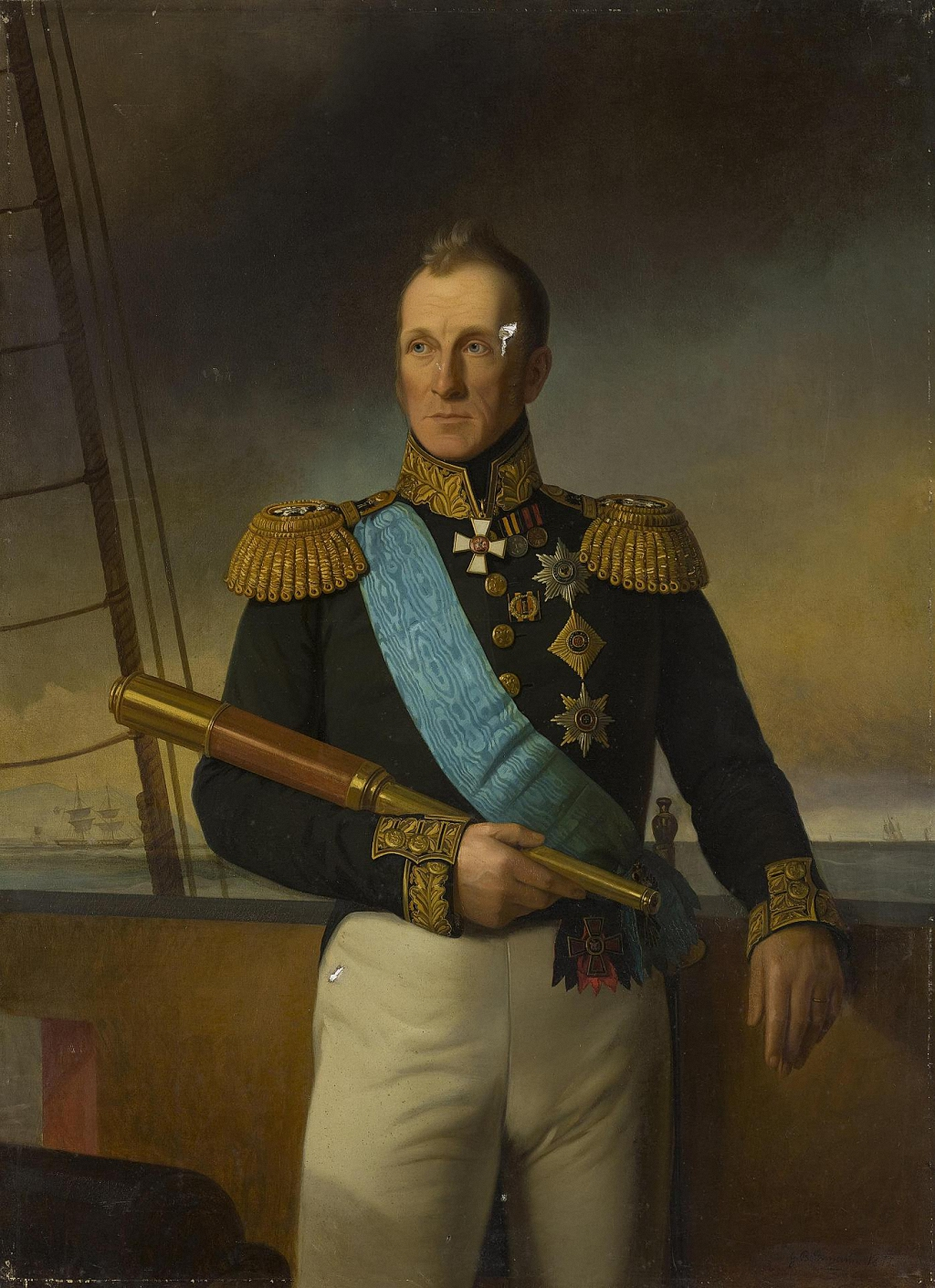
- Portrait of Greig
- Born: 6 September 1775; Kronstadt, Russian Empire
- Died: 18 January 1845 (aged 69); Saint Petersburg, Russian Empire
- Burial place: Smolensky Lutheran Cemetery
- Military career
- Allegiance: Kingdom of Great Britain; Russian Empire
- Branch: Royal Navy; Imperial Russian Navy
- Service years: 1785–1796 (Great Britain); 1798–1833 (Russia)
- Rank: Lieutenant (Great Britain); Admiral (Russia)
- Unit: HMS Culloden
- Commands: Black Sea Fleet; Retvizan
- Conflicts: Napoleonic Wars; Russo-Turkish War (1806–1812); Battle of Athos; Battle of the Dardanelles (1807); War of the Sixth Coalition; Siege of Danzig (1813); Russo-Turkish War (1828–1829); Siege of Varna (1828)
- Other work: State Council; Military governor of Sevastopol

Aleksey Samuilovich Greig (Russian: Алексе́й Самуи́лович Грейг) (6 September 1775 – 18 January 1845), born into the noble Greig family, was an admiral of the Imperial Russian Navy. Born in Kronstadt, he was the son of Admiral Samuel Greig (1735–1788, then Governor of Kronstadt), brother-in-law of Mary Somerville, and father of General Samuil Greig (1827–1887), Russian Minister of Finance.

He studied at the Royal High School, Edinburgh under the Rector Alexander Adam from 1783 to 1785, and then served as a volunteer on board HMS Culloden, under Captain Thomas Troubridge.

Greig started his career in the British Royal Navy, serving in East India and Europe from 1785 to 1796. He returned to Russia to take part in the Mediterranean expeditions against France from 1798 to 1800. Under the command of Admiral Dmitry Senyavin, he distinguished himself in 1807 in the Battle of Athos and the Battle of the Dardanelles, which resulted in the Russian occupation of Lemnos and Tenedos. At the close of the Napoleonic Wars he was placed in command of the sea blockade of Danzig during the 1813 siege of Danzig.

Greig was not the only Russian officer of Scottish descent. While still a captain, he and another Scotsman, Captain Brown, were involved in some trouble due to the wreck of the Imperial frigate Archangel in 1797. In the following year, in the squadron off the Texel, he commanded the 64-gun Retvizan; and Captain Robert Crown, said to be a Scot, had the 74-gun Utislaw.

In 1801 Greig was banished to Siberia for a time, in consequence of boldly remonstrating with the Emperor Paul for his severity to some British naval prisoners.

In 1816 Greig became Commander of the Black Sea Fleet, a post which he kept for 17 years. At the same time, he served as Military Governor of Sevastopol and Nikolayev, introducing many reforms and improvements that the grateful citizens of Nikolayev would later erect a statue to his memory in 1873.

During the Russo-Turkish War of 1828–29, Greig's bold leadership made itself felt at the Sieges of Varna and Anapa. He was in full command of the Russian fleet, which he had brought from Sevastopol: forty vessels, eight being of the line, acting in conjunction with the troops under Prince Menshikov for three months by sea and land. During these operations the Emperor Nicholas I of Russia was his guest on board the Parizh, which had the Diplomatic Chancery and 1,300 persons under her flag.

In 1833 Greig was recalled to Saint Petersburg, where the Emperor Nicholas appointed him a member of the State Council of Imperial Russia and asked him to superintend the construction of the Pulkovo Observatory.

An atoll in French Polynesia Niau is named Greig after Aleksey Greig. It was named in his honor by the Russian Admiral Fabian Gottlieb von Bellingshausen in 1820.

== Family ==
Aleksey Greig married Julia Stalinskaya, who was Jewish. This created social problems for them, when the family moved to St.Petersburg. They had five children, and their sons all served in the navy, achieving prominence. Greig's grandfather Charles was an emigrant from Scotland. His father Samuil was an admiral in the Russian Imperial Navy.
