= Battle of Athos =

Part of the Russo-Turkish War (1806–1812)

- Part of the Second Archipelago Expedition in the Russo-Turkish War (1806–1812)
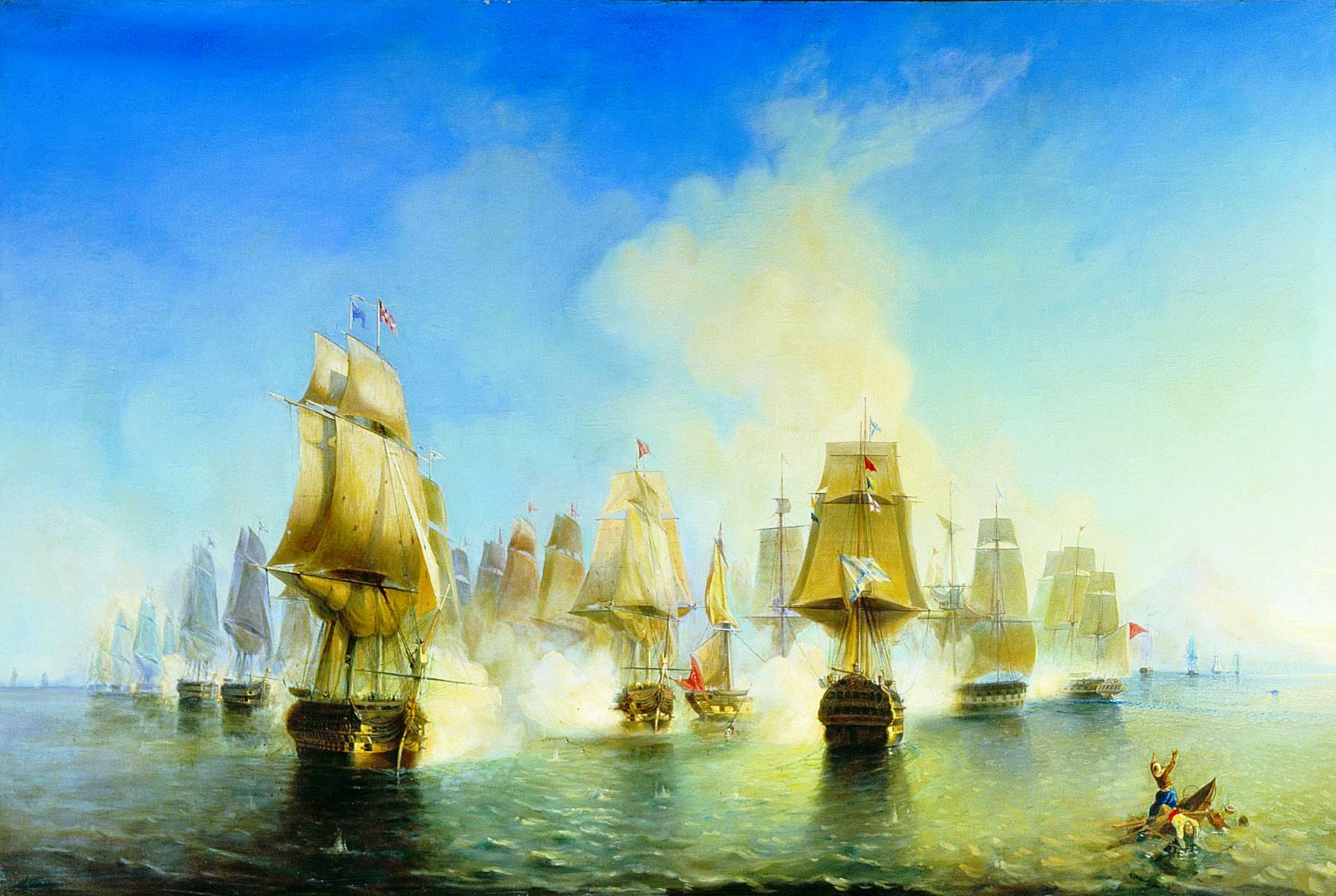
- The Battle of Athos by Alexey Bogolyubov
Date	1–2 July (Note: Old Style: 19–20 June) 1807
Location	Between Mount Athos and Lemnos 40°4′9″N 24°55′54″E
Result	Russian victory

Belligerents
Russian Empire	Ottoman Empire

Commanders and leaders
(Russian Empire) Dmitry Senyavin (Russian Empire) Aleksey Greig	Seydi Ali Pasha; Bekir Bey (POW)

Strength
10 ships of the line, 754 cannons	10 ships of the line, 5 frigates, 3 sloops, 2 brigs, 1,196 cannons

Casualties and losses
78 killed, 172 wounded	3 ships of the line, 3 frigates, 2 sloops, 1,000+ killed and wounded, 774 prisoners

The Battle of Athos (also known as the Battle of Monte Sancto or the Battle of Lemnos) took place on 1–2 July 1807^{New Style} as a part of the Napoleonic Wars during the Russo-Turkish War of 1806–1812. The Russian squadron under Vice Admiral Dmitry Senyavin defeated Kapudan Pasha Seydi Ali's Ottoman Turkish squadron.

== Background ==
In December 1806, the Ottoman Sultan Selim III felt threatened by Russian activities associated with the Napoleonic Wars. The Sultan closed the Turkish Straits to Russian shipping and declared war on the Russian Empire. On 22 May 1807, the Russian navy and the Ottoman navy engaged in a short sea battle in the Aegean Sea near the Dardanelles.

After the Battle of the Dardanelles in May, the Russian navy continued to blockade the strait during the month of June. Although the blockade served an important military purpose in and of itself by impeding the flow of food and materials to Constantinople, the Russian navy in the Aegean Sea sought primarily to draw the Ottoman navy out of the strait for a decisive engagement on the open sea. Although the Ottoman navy had numerical superiority, the Turks attempted to avoid a direct confrontation with the Russian fleet. As a result, the Ottoman navy sheltered in the strait and ventured out to attack the Russian naval base on Tenedos only when conditions were favorable.

== Maneuvers before the battle ==
To lure the Ottoman navy into the Aegean Sea, the Russian Vice-Admiral, Dmitry Senyavin, undertook numerous maneuvers with his fleet often reducing the number of ships that he had positioned in the vicinity of the entrance to the Dardanelles. On 5 June, Senyavin sent Rear-Admiral Greig in command of four battleships to the island of Lemnos, approximately 41 miles west of the Dardanelles. Greig and his squadron was then brought back quickly when Senyavin falsely suspected that the Ottoman navy was entering the Aegean Sea. On 13 June, Greig was sent back to Lemnos this time with his full force of five battleships. Russian marines were temporarily landed on Lemnos, but by 18 June Greig and his squadron had returned to Tenedos.

Finally on 22 June, Seyid Ali, the Kapudan Pasha or Grand Admiral of the Ottoman navy, left the Dardanelles with a taskforce of 16 ships including 8 battleships and 5 frigates. After tacking into the wind all day Seyid Ali anchored his fleet near Imbros, approximately 12 miles North-Northwest of the Dardanelles. Over the course of the following days, Senyavin and his Russian fleet attempted to work their way up to the Turks but were prevented in doing so by light winds and a strong adverse current. The Ottoman fleet also kept underway during this time always keeping an escape route back to the Dardanelles open. On 24 June, Seyid Ali’s task force was joined by four additional ships, 2 battleships and 2 frigates.

On 27 June, Senyavin decided to try to approach the Ottoman fleet by sailing to the west side Lemnos where there was less current. When Senyavin made that move, Seyid Ali and his entire taskforce bore down on Tenedos, bombarding the fortifications and a brig in the harbor. A failed attempt was also made to put a land force on the north side of island. After four hours of bombardment, the Ottoman fleet disengaged and drew off to a position between Tenedos and the Asiatic shore. Over the course of the next two days the Ottoman fleet returned to Tenedos two times to bombard the fortifications and land their marines. At 8 am on 29 June, Seyid Ali’s taskforce sighted Senyavin and the Russian fleet approaching from the north. The Turks ceased their bombardment of Tenedos and took their only course of escape fleeing west toward Lemnos.

Upon reaching Tenedos, Senyavin used the next two days to reprovision his fleet and to hunt down and destroy Turkish small craft remaining in the vicinity. Aware that the Ottoman task force had taken a western course when it sailed from Tenedos, Senyavin and the Russian fleet of 10 battleships departed their naval base on 30 June in a northerly direction continuing to block the access to the Dardanelles. At the end of the day, the Russian fleet had reached a point six miles north of Lemnos. Early the next morning, Senyavin sighted Seyid Ali’s taskforce to the west of Lemnos and immediately moved to attack.

== Battle ==
When Senyavin caught up with the Ottoman taskforce between 8 am and 9 am on the morning of 1 July, the Turks had their battleships aligned in a straight row heading north. Senyavin arranged his battleships in two parallel rows of five ships each and approached the Turks in a perpendicular manner from the east, striking the Turkish flagships in the middle of the column. The Ottoman immediately opened fire and badly damaged a lead Russian ship, the Rafail. The remaining Russian battleships paired up and turned to the north to engage the Turks in a broadside manner. Senyavin sailed to the head of the column with two battleships and quickly put a leading Turkish frigate out of action. This caused the battleship following the frigate and the entire Turkish column to heave to and slow. The two fleets then engaged in battle until 10 am when the Turks began to break away with the Russians in pursuit.

At noon the winds died down and Senyavin broke off the engagement. The Ottoman taskforce began to gather east of the Mount Athos peninsula while the Russians maintained their position to the east of the Turkish fleet. Later that evening, a light breeze came up and the Ottoman taskforce continued on a northerly course toward the island of Thasos. During that time, the Turkish frigate Sadd al-bahr fell behind and was captured by the Russians without additional fighting.

On the morning of 2 July, most of the Ottoman taskforce was near Thasos. Two Ottoman battleships and a sloop were seen straggling behind the fleet and were quickly set upon by the Russians. The Russians drove the three ships up the gulf west of Mount Athos and forced the Turks to run the ships aground and set them on fire. Two days later on 4 July, the Turks were seen setting two badly damaged ships on fire near Thasos.

During this time, the Russian fleet concentrated near Lemnos and then made its way back to their beleaguered naval base on Tenedos where they helped defeat the Turkish marines who had been attempting to capture the base without success for nine days. The Ottoman fleet meanwhile made its way back to the safety of the Dardanelles losing two additional ships near Samothrace in the process.

== Aftermath ==
Of the 20 Turkish ships involved in the battle, only 12 returned to the Dardanelles. Lost were 3 battleships, 3 frigates, and 2 sloops. The total number of casualties is not known but was estimated to be heavy. The Russians did not lose a single ship but suffered casualties of 79 killed and 189 wounded.

There were no further naval battles between the Russians and the Turks with respect to the Dardanelles during the Russo-Turkish War of 1806-1812 as the Treaties of Tilsit signed on 7 July between Napoleon and Tsar Alexander of Russia provided that Senyavin’s fleet be sent back to the Baltic Sea. At that time, the British also began to negotiate a peace treaty with the Ottoman Empire and supported their position by a show of force, bringing their own navy into the Aegean Sea.

== See also ==
- Order of battle at the Battle of Athos
- Dardanelles Operation
