= Battle of the Dardanelles (1807) =

1807 naval battle of the Russo-Turkish War (1806–1812)

- Part of the Second Archipelago Expedition during the Russo-Turkish War (1806–1812)
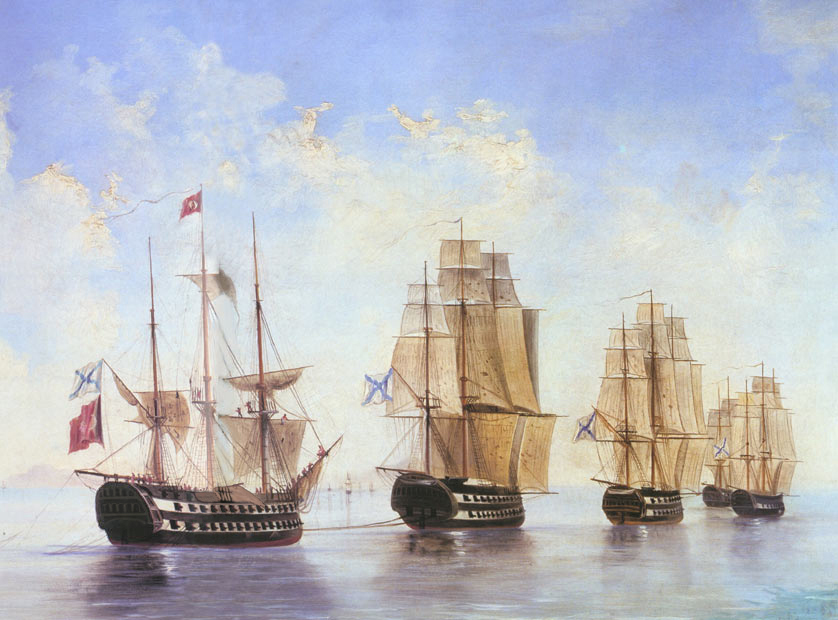
- After the Battle of Athos. June 19, 1807. (Alexey Bogolyubov)
Date	22 May 1807
Location	Dardanelles 40°0′45.33″N 26°9′28.84″E
Result	Russian victory

Belligerents
Russian Empire	Ottoman Empire

Commanders and leaders
Dmitry Senyavin	Seyid Ali

Strength
10 ships of the line, 1 frigate	8 ships of the line, 6 frigates, more than 50 smaller ships

Casualties and losses
26 killed and 56 wounded	Up to 2,000 killed and wounded, 2 ships grounded

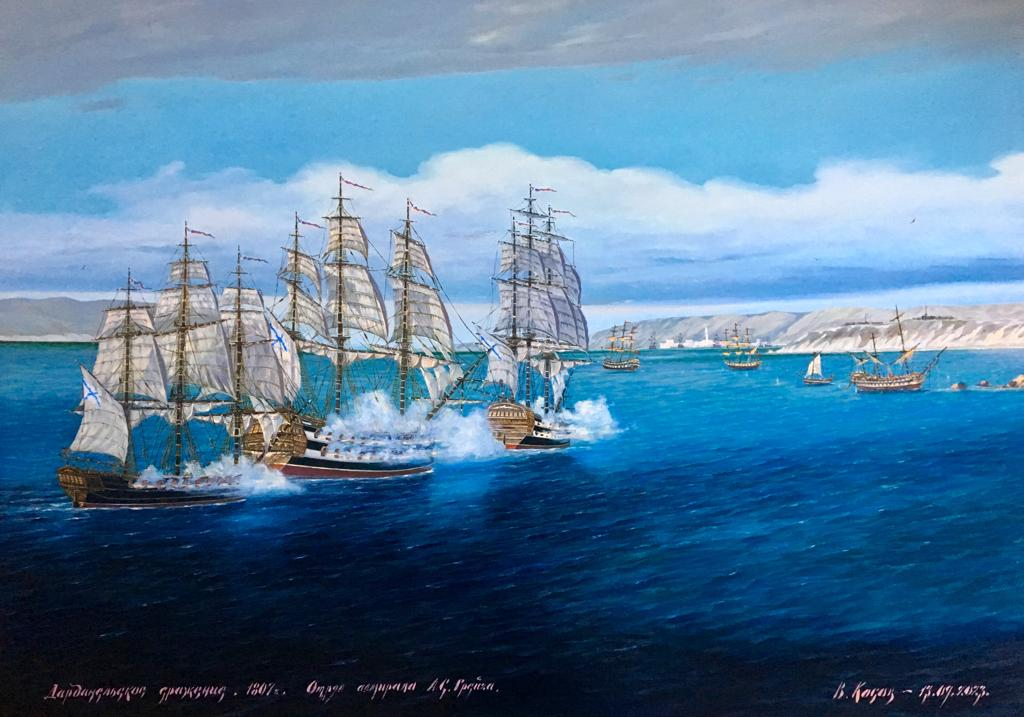
Battle of the Dardanelles. 1807. Admiral A. S. Greig's detachment by Vladimir Kosov, 2023

The Battle of the Dardanelles took place on 22 May (10 May^{Old Style}) 1807 as a part of the Napoleonic Wars during the Russo-Turkish War of 1806–1812. It was fought between the Russian and Ottoman navies near the Dardanelles Strait.

== Background ==
In December 1806, Ottoman Sultan Selim III felt threatened by Russian activities associated with the Napoleonic War, closed the Turkish Straits to Russian shipping, and declared war on the Russian Empire. In response, Russia retaliated in March 1807 by sending a small fleet of ten battleships and a frigate under the command of Russian Admiral Dmitry Senyavin to blockade the Dardanelles Strait at the Aegean Sea. The Dardanelles Strait was the maritime gateway between Constantinople, the Ottoman capital, and trade routes to the Mediterranean Sea. The citizens of Constantinople depended heavily on the supply of food and materials by sea, and the Russian naval blockade of the Dardanelles created severe hardships for the Turks.

== Sea maneuvers and the battle ==
On the morning of 19 May, Seyid Ali, the Kapudan Pasha or Grand Admiral of the Ottoman navy, took a squadron of 8 ships of the line, 6 frigates and 55 smaller vessels, slipped out of the Dardanelles strait on the morning of 19 May, moved to a position between Mavro Island the Asiatic coast, and prepared to attack the island of Tenedos, which served as the base for the Russian navy in the Aegean. Senyavin, who had been anchored at Tenedos, observed the Ottoman activity and took his fleet south of Tenedos that evening intent upon turning north to the mouth of the Dardanelles in order to block Seyid Ali's squadron from retreating back to the safety of the strait.

Unfortunately for Senyavin's fleet, the winds were calm on 20 May and the Russians were unable to either reach the Dardanelles or return to Tenedos. At Tenedos, Seyid Ali took advantage of the weakened defenses and began an attack of the Russian naval base by means of gunboats and land forces. The Russian garrison on Tenedos, however, proved to be quite capable of defending the base and drove the Turks off with heavy losses.

On 21 May, there was rain and squalls in the Aegean Sea with winds from the northeast. Senyavin abandoned his plan to block the retreat of the Ottoman squadron and returned to Tenedos. The next morning while anchored at the naval base, Senyavin observed Seyid Ali's squadron anchored to the north within his sight. Neither fleet attempted to move that morning due to the prevailing winds, but at approximately 2 pm when the winds shifted to the southwest, Senyavin ordered his fleet to weigh anchors and move to attack the Turks. Simultaneously, Seyid Ali ordered his squadron to weigh anchor and flee to the safely of the Dardanelles.

At approximately 6 pm, the Russians caught up with the sternmost of the Ottoman ships. The Russian frigate Venus kept under the stern of the heavier Turkish battleships and attacked with relative safety. The Russian battleship Uriil swept across the bows of the Turkish second-in-command and carried away the jib-boom. The Russian battleship Tverdyi commanded by Admiral Senyavin sailed between the battleships of Turkish Rear-Admiral Baker Bey and Seyid Ali and engaged in a broadside to broadside at close range.

As the evening fell the two fleets intermixed and engaged in battle at the mouth of the strait. At times some of the Russian ships including Senyavin's battleship veered close to the shore and within range of the Turkish forts and their shore batteries. The battle continued till about 9 pm with most of the Turkish ships traveling deep into the safety of the strait. Three Ottoman ships, however, remained outside the strait appearing to have been run aground. As the day ended, the Russians anchored their fleet just outside and clear of the strait.

In the morning of 23 May, the Russians observed the Turks attempting to move three battleships into the safety of the Dardanelles. Two of the battleships were being towed by rowing craft. To prevent their salvage, Senyavin sent four battleships and the frigate Venus in pursuit. Before putting themselves in danger from Turkish shore batteries, the Russians battered the struggling battleships with their guns and caused all three to be run aground.

== Aftermath ==
The engagement must be considered as a victory for the Russians. The Ottomans might have suffered as many as 2,000 casualties and were unable to break the blockade. Three of their battleships were damaged so badly that they were ultimately deemed unfit for further service. The Russians suffered 82 casualties but lost no ships and continued to block the Dardanelles for an additional month until they re-engaged the Turks at the Battle of Athos.

== See also ==
- Dardanelles Gun
- Dardanelles operation
