= Greig (Russian nobility) =

Russian noble family

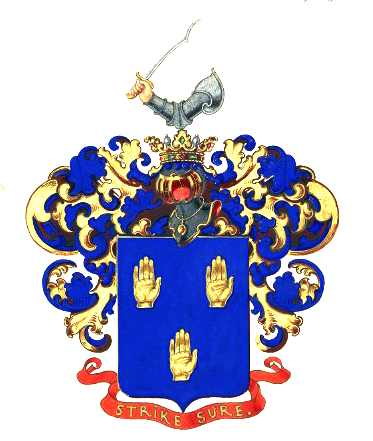
- Parent house: Clan Gregor
- Country: Russian Empire
- Motto: Strike Sure

The Greig family (Russian: Грейг) is the name of a Russian noble family of Scottish origin. They are a branch of Clan Gregor, that changed their name due to the proscription of the name MacGregor in 1603 by King James VI & I.

== Notable members ==
- Samuel Greig (Russian: Самуи́л Ка́рлович Грейг), (1735, Inverkeithing, Fife, Scotland - 26 October 1788, Tallinn, Estonia, Russian Empire) was a Scottish-born Russian admiral who distinguished himself in the Battle of Chesma (1770) and the Battle of Hogland (1788). In 1782 he was elected a Fellow of the Royal Society.
  - Aleksey Samuilovich Greig (Russian: Алексей Самуилович Грейг) (6 September 1775 – 18 January 1845) was an admiral of the Imperial Russian Navy, was the son of Admiral Samuel Greig, brother-in-law of Mary Somerville.
    - Alexey (5 September 1829—11 March 1865)
    - Samuil Alexseevich Greig (1827 — 1887) was a full general and adjutant general of Imperial Russian Army, also he served as State Comptroller (1874–1878) and Minister of Finance of the Russian Empire (1878 - 1880).
    - Julia (5 September 1829—11 March 1865)
    - Ivan (6 March 1831—15 September 1893)
    - Vasili (10 March 1832—1902)
    - Sarra (1833—1834)
    - Eugenie (15 February 1835—16 February 1870).

== Honours ==
In 1864, Greigia is a genus of the botanical family Bromeliaceae is named after Samuel Greig, by Eduard August von Regel (a director of the St Petersburg Botanical Garden). In 1873, Regel named a species of Tulip after Samuel Greig, Tulipa greigii. Due to Greig once being president of the Russian Horticultural Society.

The atoll of Niau in French Polynesia was named Greig after Aleksey Greig, by Russian Admiral Fabian Gottlieb von Bellingshausen in 1820.

== Sources ==
- В. Т. Судейкин (1890–1907). "Грейг, адмиралы и государственные деятели". Brockhaus and Efron Encyclopedic Dictionary: In 86 Volumes (82 Volumes and 4 Additional Volumes) (in Russian). St. Petersburg: F. A. Brockhaus.
