= Greigia columbiana =

Conservation status
- Least Concern (IUCN 3.1)

Scientific classification
- Kingdom: Plantae
- Clade: Tracheophytes
- Clade: Angiosperms
- Clade: Monocots
- Clade: Commelinids
- Order: Poales
- Family: Bromeliaceae
- Genus: Greigia
- Species: G. columbiana

Binomial name
- Greigia columbiana L.B.Sm.

Species of flowering plant

Greigia columbiana is a plant species in the genus Greigia. This species is native to Costa Rica, Panama, Colombia, Ecuador, and Venezuela.

Two varieties are recognized:

1. Greigia columbiana var. columbiana - Costa Rica, Panama, Colombia, Venezuela
2. Greigia columbiana var. subinermis L.B.Sm. - Colombia, Ecuador
