= Greigia vanhyningii =

Scientific classification
- Kingdom: Plantae
- Clade: Tracheophytes
- Clade: Angiosperms
- Clade: Monocots
- Clade: Commelinids
- Order: Poales
- Family: Bromeliaceae
- Genus: Greigia
- Species: G. vanhyningii

Binomial name
- Greigia vanhyningii L.B.Sm.

Species of flowering plant

Greigia vanhyningii is a plant species in the genus Greigia. This species is endemic to southern Mexico (States of Veracruz, Oaxaca, and Chiapas).

== Taxonomy ==
The species was first described in 1959. The original description spelt the epithet as van-hyningii, but the International Plant Names Index deletes the hyphen.
