= Battle of Athos order of battle =

This is a listing of ships that fought at the Battle of Athos, 30 June 1807, during the Russo-Turkish War of 1806–1812. Spelling of Turkish ships is uncertain.

== Imperial Russian Navy ==
- Rafail 84
- Selafail 74
- Moshtchnyi 74
- Tverdyi 74 (flag)
- Skoryi

Second line:

- Silnyi
- Uriil 84
- Yaroslav 74
- Retvizan 64 (flag 2)
- Sv. Elena 74

750 guns total

== Ottoman Turkish Navy ==
- Masudiya 120 (flag)
- Sadd al-bahr 84 (flag 2) - Captured 1 July
- Anka-yi bahri 84
- Taus i bahri 84
- Tevfik-numa 84
- Bisharet (or Biafaret?) 84 - Aground and scuttled 3 July
- Kilid-i bahri 84
- Sayyad-i bahri 74
- Gulbang-i-Nusrat 74
- Jebel-andaz 74

Frigates:

- Meskeni-ghazi 50
- Bedr-i zafar 50
- Fakih-i zafar 50
- Nessim 50 - Aground and scuttled 3 July
- Iskenderiya 44

Sloops:

- Metelin 32 - Aground and scuttled 3 July
- Rahbar-i alam 28

Others:

- Denyuvet? 32
- Alamat i Nusrat 18
- Melankai? 18

850 guns total
