= Greigia berteroi =

Scientific classification
- Kingdom: Plantae
- Clade: Tracheophytes
- Clade: Angiosperms
- Clade: Monocots
- Clade: Commelinids
- Order: Poales
- Family: Bromeliaceae
- Genus: Greigia
- Species: G. berteroi

Binomial name
- Greigia berteroi Skottsberg

Synonyms
- Hesperogreigia berteroi (Skottsb.) Skottsb.

Species of plant

Greigia berteroi is a species of flowering plant in the family Bromeliaceae. This species is endemic to the Juan Fernández Islands in the South Pacific, off the coast of Chile.

The species is listed as critically endangered.
