= Second Archipelago Expedition =

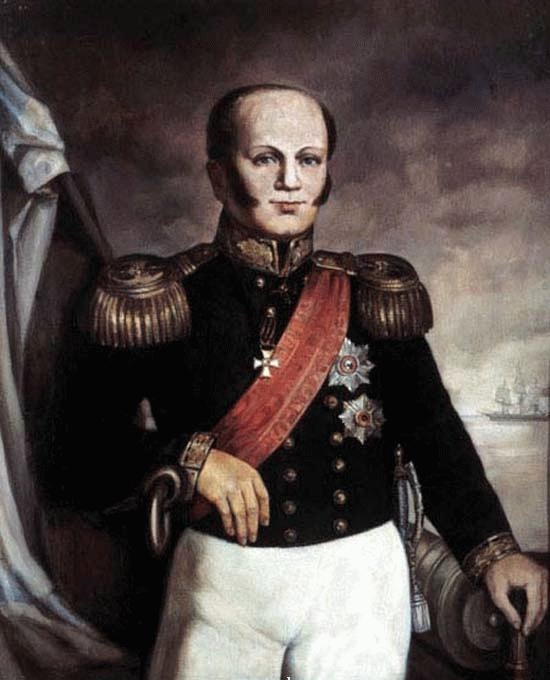
A portrait of Dmitry Senyavin

The Second Archipelago Expedition (Note: The archipelago in question is the Aegean Islands, as in the First Archipelago Expedition.) was an expedition by the Imperial Russian Navy's Baltic Fleet under Admiral Dmitry Senyavin into the Mediterranean between 1805 and 1807. It formed part of the War of the Third Coalition, War of the Fourth Coalition and the Russo-Turkish War of 1806–1812. Senyavin's fleet defeated the Ottoman Navy at the Battle of the Dardanelles and the Battle of Athos and, in combination with Russian successes on land near the Danube and in the Caucasus, forced the Sublime Porte to conclude a truce with Russia in August 1807. After the conclusion of the Peace of Tilsit with Napoleon, the Russian navy lifted its blockade of the Dardanelles and returned to the Baltic Sea.
