= Taylor sept =

Taylor is a sept ("branch") of Clan Cameron, a Scottish clan. Present day members of the Taylor sept hold the Scottish surname Taylor.

== Sept namebearer ==
Some members of the Taylor sept are descendants of Donald Cameron ('Taillear Dubh na Tuaighe'), who lived in the Scottish Highlands Lochaber area ("Cameron country") circa mid 16th century. Others, with no documented connection to Taillear Dubh na Tuaighe or the Clan Cameron, are simply descended from those with an occupational surname meaning tailor. Though Donald's father was XIV Chief of Clan Cameron, Donald, born out of wedlock, could not inherit the title. Nursed by a tailor's wife, Donald received the nickname An Taillear Dubh (an, a diminutive; Taillear, an occupational reference to the caretaker's husband; Dubh, translated as "black" in the context of meaning "swarthy" or "dark tempered") as an infant.

As a young man, Donald became skilled in battle with the Lochaber axe, and his nickname evolved to Taillear Dubh na Tuaighe ("Black Taylor of the Axe") because of his fighting prowess. Taylor and his family eventually found safety in Cowal. There, descendants of his family and followers became known as Mac-an-taillear ("son of the tailor").

== Later history ==
In the 18th century, MacInTaillear, Macintaylor, Taylor, and Tayler families were still living on the Cowal peninsula. They referred to themselves as Clann an Taillear Dhuibh Chamronaich ("Children of the Black Taylor of the Camerons").(Mackenzie, 1875, pages 526–530)

== Coat of arms and tartan ==
The Taylor sept bears the Cameron Clan coat of arms, a depiction of a "wild man" with a Lochaber axe. Barring actual historical evidence, interpretations vary as to whether the depiction is the likeness of the Taylor sept patriarch, or if it denotes a character attribute and weapon of choice common amongst early Cameron.

In 1955, Lt.Col. Iain B. Cameron Taylor designed the Taylor sept tartan with double black lines, honoring Taillear Dubh ("Black Taylor").

== See also ==
- Taylor (surname)
- Clan Tailyour
