= Greigia alborosea =

Conservation status
- Least Concern (IUCN 3.1)

Scientific classification
- Kingdom: Plantae
- Clade: Tracheophytes
- Clade: Angiosperms
- Clade: Monocots
- Clade: Commelinids
- Order: Poales
- Family: Bromeliaceae
- Genus: Greigia
- Species: G. alborosea

Binomial name
- Greigia alborosea (Griseb.) Mez

Synonyms
- Karatas alborosea (Griseb.) Baker; Nidularium alboroseum Griseb.

Species of flowering plant

Greigia alborosea is a species of flowering plant in the family Bromeliaceae. This species is endemic to Venezuela.
