= Greigia oaxacana =

Scientific classification
- Kingdom: Plantae
- Clade: Tracheophytes
- Clade: Angiosperms
- Clade: Monocots
- Clade: Commelinids
- Order: Poales
- Family: Bromeliaceae
- Genus: Greigia
- Species: G. oaxacana

Binomial name
- Greigia oaxacana L.B.Sm.

Synonyms
- Greigia juareziana Smith, 1959

Species of flowering plant

Greigia oaxacana is a plant species in the genus Greigia. This species is endemic to Mexico.
