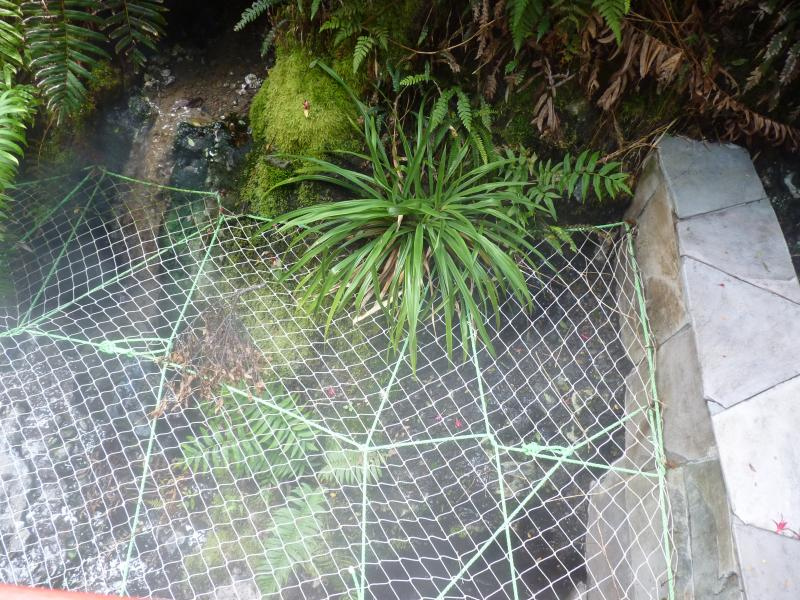

Scientific classification
- Kingdom: Plantae
- Clade: Embryophytes
- Clade: Tracheophytes
- Clade: Spermatophytes
- Clade: Angiosperms
- Clade: Monocots
- Clade: Commelinids
- Order: Poales
- Family: Bromeliaceae
- Genus: Greigia
- Species: G. pearcei

Binomial name
- Greigia pearcei Mez

= Greigia pearcei =

Species of flowering plant

Greigia pearcei is a species of flowering plant in the family Bromeliaceae. This species is endemic to Chile.
