= Greigia aristeguietae =

Scientific classification
- Kingdom: Plantae
- Clade: Tracheophytes
- Clade: Angiosperms
- Clade: Monocots
- Clade: Commelinids
- Order: Poales
- Family: Bromeliaceae
- Genus: Greigia
- Species: G. aristeguietae

Binomial name
- Greigia aristeguietae L.B.Sm.

Species of flowering plant

Greigia aristeguietae is a plant species in the genus Greigia. This species is endemic to Venezuela.
