= Greigia ocellata =

Scientific classification
- Kingdom: Plantae
- Clade: Tracheophytes
- Clade: Angiosperms
- Clade: Monocots
- Clade: Commelinids
- Order: Poales
- Family: Bromeliaceae
- Genus: Greigia
- Species: G. ocellata

Binomial name
- Greigia ocellata L.B.Smith & Steyermark

Species of flowering plant

Greigia ocellata is a plant species in the genus Greigia. It is also perennial.

This species is native to Venezuela and Colombia. It is listed as critically endangered by the IUCN.

== Sources ==
- Holst, Bruce K. (1 February 1994). "Checklist of Venezuelan Bromeliaceae with Notes on Species Distribution by State and Levels of Endemism". Selbyana. 15 (1). ISSN 2689-0682. JSTOR 41759858.
