= Greigia cochabambae =

Scientific classification
- Kingdom: Plantae
- Clade: Tracheophytes
- Clade: Angiosperms
- Clade: Monocots
- Clade: Commelinids
- Order: Poales
- Family: Bromeliaceae
- Genus: Greigia
- Species: G. cochabambae

Binomial name
- Greigia cochabambae H.Luther

Species of flowering plant

Greigia cochabambae is a plant species in the genus Greigia. This species is endemic to Bolivia.
