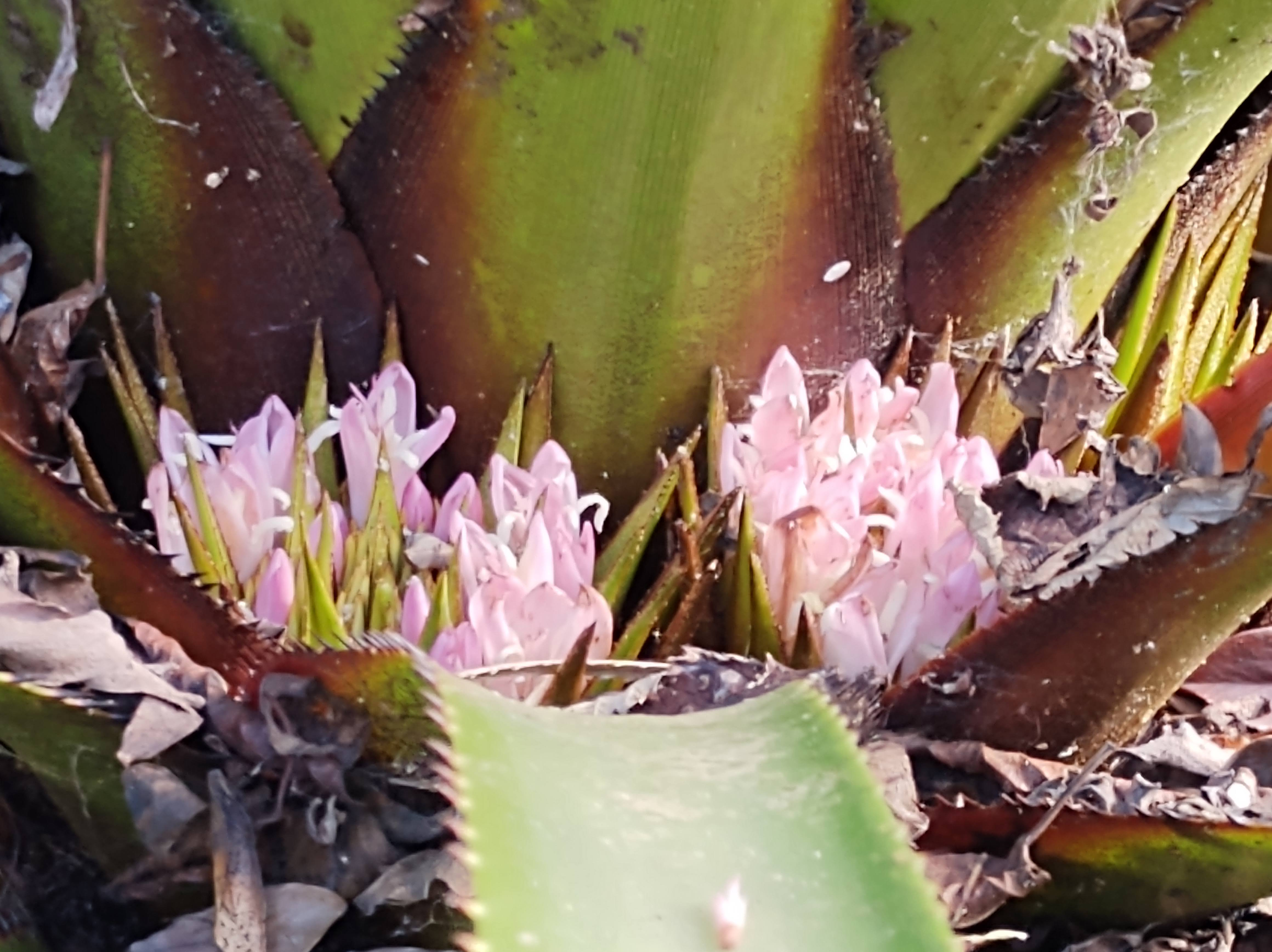

Scientific classification
- Kingdom: Plantae
- Clade: Tracheophytes
- Clade: Angiosperms
- Clade: Monocots
- Clade: Commelinids
- Order: Poales
- Family: Bromeliaceae
- Genus: Greigia
- Species: G. landbeckii

Binomial name
- Greigia landbeckii (Lechler ex Philippi) Philippi

= Greigia landbeckii =

Species of plant

Greigia landbeckii is a plant species in the genus Greigia. It is endemic to Chile. A synonym is Bromelia landbeckii. Its common name is ñocha, and was traditionally used in wickerwork.
