= Greigia mulfordii =

Scientific classification
- Kingdom: Plantae
- Clade: Tracheophytes
- Clade: Angiosperms
- Clade: Monocots
- Clade: Commelinids
- Order: Poales
- Family: Bromeliaceae
- Genus: Greigia
- Species: G. mulfordii

Binomial name
- Greigia mulfordii L.B.Sm.

Species of flowering plant

Greigia mulfordii is a plant species in the genus Greigia. This species is native to Ecuador and Colombia.

Two varieties are recognized:

1. Greigia mulfordii var. macrantha L.B.Sm. - Ecuador and Colombia
2. Greigia mulfordii var. mulfordii - Ecuador and Colombia
