= Greigia atrobrunnea =

Conservation status
- Vulnerable (IUCN 3.1)

Scientific classification
- Kingdom: Plantae
- Clade: Tracheophytes
- Clade: Angiosperms
- Clade: Monocots
- Clade: Commelinids
- Order: Poales
- Family: Bromeliaceae
- Genus: Greigia
- Species: G. atrobrunnea

Binomial name
- Greigia atrobrunnea H.Luther

Species of flowering plant

Greigia Atrobrunnea is a species of plant in the family Bromeliaceae. It is endemic to Ecuador, where it was first identified in 1981. It is a terrestrial bromeliad where the plants grow in groups. Its natural habitat is subtropical or tropical moist montane forests. It is threatened by habitat loss and was assessed as vulnerable by the International Union for Conservation of Nature in 2003.
