= Greigia vulcanica =

Conservation status
- Least Concern (IUCN 3.1)

Scientific classification
- Kingdom: Plantae
- Clade: Tracheophytes
- Clade: Angiosperms
- Clade: Monocots
- Clade: Commelinids
- Order: Poales
- Family: Bromeliaceae
- Genus: Greigia
- Species: G. vulcanica

Binomial name
- Greigia vulcanica André

Species of plant

Greigia vulcanica is a species of flowering plant in the Bromeliaceae family. It is native to Colombia and Ecuador.
