= Dmitry Senyavin =

Imperial Russian Navy officer (1763–1831)

Dmitry Nikolayevich Senyavin
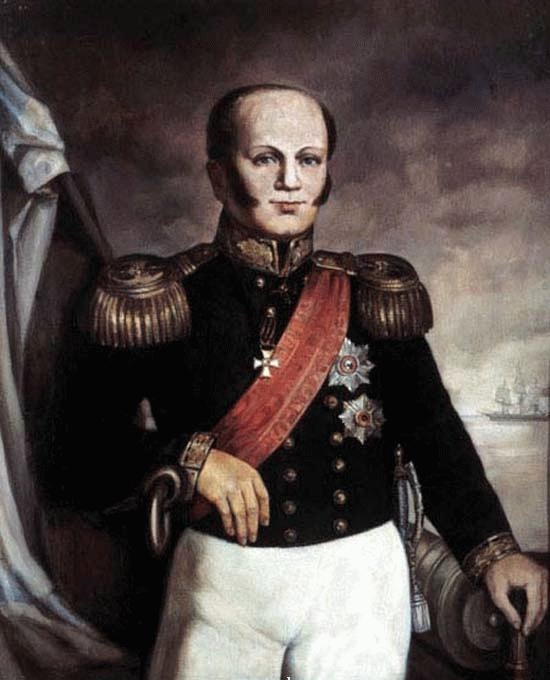
- Born: 17 August 1763; Borovsk, Russia
- Died: 17 April 1831 (aged 67); Saint Petersburg, Russia
- Relatives: Alexei Senyavin (great-uncle)
- Military career
- Allegiance: Russia
- Branch: Imperial Russian Navy
- Service years: 1777–1813; 1825–1830
- Rank: Admiral
- Commands: Baltic Fleet
- Conflicts: Russo-Turkish War (1787–92); Battle of Fidonisi; Battle of Ochakov; Battle of Kaliakria; Great French War; Coalition Wars; Mediterranean campaign of 1798; Siege of Corfu (1798–1799); Second Archipelago Expedition (Note: Taking command of Naval and Ground Forces in the Mediterranean Sea, Senyavin prevented the capture of the Ionian Islands by the French, seized footholds in Dalmatia, cleared Montenegro.); Action of Cattaro (1806) (Note: The Russian squadron seized the fortress of Kotor (Cattaro).); Action of Ragusa (1806) (Note: Detachments of Montenegrins, supported by the Russian squadron, attacked the French posts at Ragusa. The fight yielded no tangible results for either side. This was during the Siege of Ragusa.); Actions of Curzola (Note: The Russian squadron forced the surrender of the garrisons on Curzola Island in 1806.); Actions of Brazza (Note: The squadron forced the surrender of the garrisons on Brazza Island in 1806.); Russo-Turkish War (1806–12); Second Archipelago Expedition; Battle of the Dardanelles (1807); Capture of the island of Tenedos; Battle of Athos; Anglo-Russian War (1807–12); Greek War of Independence; Battle of Navarino
- Awards: Order of St. George 4th Class; Order of St. Vladimir 4th Class; Order of St. Anna 2nd Class; Order of St. Alexander Nevsky

Russian Military Commander of Kotor
- In office 29 March 1806 – 26 January 1807
- Monarch: Alexander I
- Chairman of the Committee of Ministers: Vacant
- Minister of Foreign Affairs: Adam Jerzy Czartoryski; Andreas Eberhard von Budberg
- Minister of Land Forces: Sergey Vyazmitinov
- Preceded by: Genrikh Genrikhovich Belle
- Succeeded by: Ilya Andreyevich Baratynskiy

Admiral Dmitry Nikolayevich Senyavin (Russian: Дмитрий Николаевич Сенявин; 17 August [O.S. 6 August] 1763 – 17 April [O.S. 5 April] 1831) was an Imperial Russian Navy officer who served the Russo-Turkish wars and French Revolutionary and Napoleonic Wars. He was the successor of Fyodor Ushakov: in the Battle of Athos, Senyavin developed the tactics used by Ushakov — to attack the column by several groups, directing the main blow against the Ottoman flagships.

== Service under Ushakov ==
Senyavin belonged to a notable noble family of sea captains from the Kaluga Governorate, all of whom, starting with his great uncle, served in the Imperial Russian Navy. Having graduated from the Naval Cadet Corps in 1780, he took part in an expedition to Portugal, then joined the Black Sea Fleet upon its formation in 1783 and helped construct the naval base in Sevastopol. In 1786, he commanded a packetboat while at the fleet. Family interests gained him rapid promotion, especially after his resolute actions had prevented a flagship from capsizing during the Varna expedition and Prince Potemkin had entrusted him with a vital task of transporting diplomatic mail to the Russian embassy in Constantinople.

During the Russo-Turkish War, Senyavin was present at the battles of Fidonisi and Ochakov and went to Saint Petersburg to inform the Empress about the former victory. He was promoted to adjudant general in 1788. Although he distinguished himself in command of the battleship Navarchia during the Battle of Kaliakria, he had no patience with Ushakov's cautious and cunctatory approach and paid little attention to his authority, which resulted in his confinement to a guardhouse and the threat of his reduction in rank. At last Potemkin effected a reconciliation between Senyavin and his peer, remarking in his letter to Ushakov that Senyavin could become the greatest admiral that Russia had ever known.

During Ushakov's Mediterranean Expedition of 1798–1800, in which he took part in the years of 1798–1799, Senyavin assumed command of the flagship Saint Peter, equipped with 72 guns. His sailors stormed the French-held Castle of Santa Maura in Lefkada and took part in the capture of Corfu. The expedition over, Senyavin administered the ports of Kherson, and Sevastopol. In 1804, he was promoted to rear admiral and given the task of administering the port in Reval.

== Mediterranean campaigns ==
Three years later, Alexander I of Russia, still entertaining grand designs aimed at stalling Napoleon's expansion in the Adriatic, mounted another Mediterranean expedition, with Vice-Admiral Senyavin as commander-in-chief. By September 1806, Senyavin reasserted Russian control of the southern Adriatic, disrupted Dubrovnik's sea trade, and was poised to attack Lesina. He found a natural ally in the Orthodox prince-bishops of Montenegro, who pledged to support him on land.

The Russian fleet captured the islands of Curzola and Lissa, while the Austrians were persuaded to surrender Cattaro to them. As a result of these operations, the French were prevented from taking hold of the Ionian Islands. However, the fruits of Senyavin's activity were thrown away by the tsar who would conclude the Treaty of Tilsit with Napoleon the following year.

Even before the treaty was negotiated, a new war with Turkey had erupted and Senyavin's squadron was ordered to proceed to the Aegean Sea in order to attack Constantinople. He reached the Dardanelles on 24 February 1807 and captured the island of Tenedos in March. Using the island as his place d'armes, Senyavin blockaded the Straits and cut off supplies to the Sultan's capital.

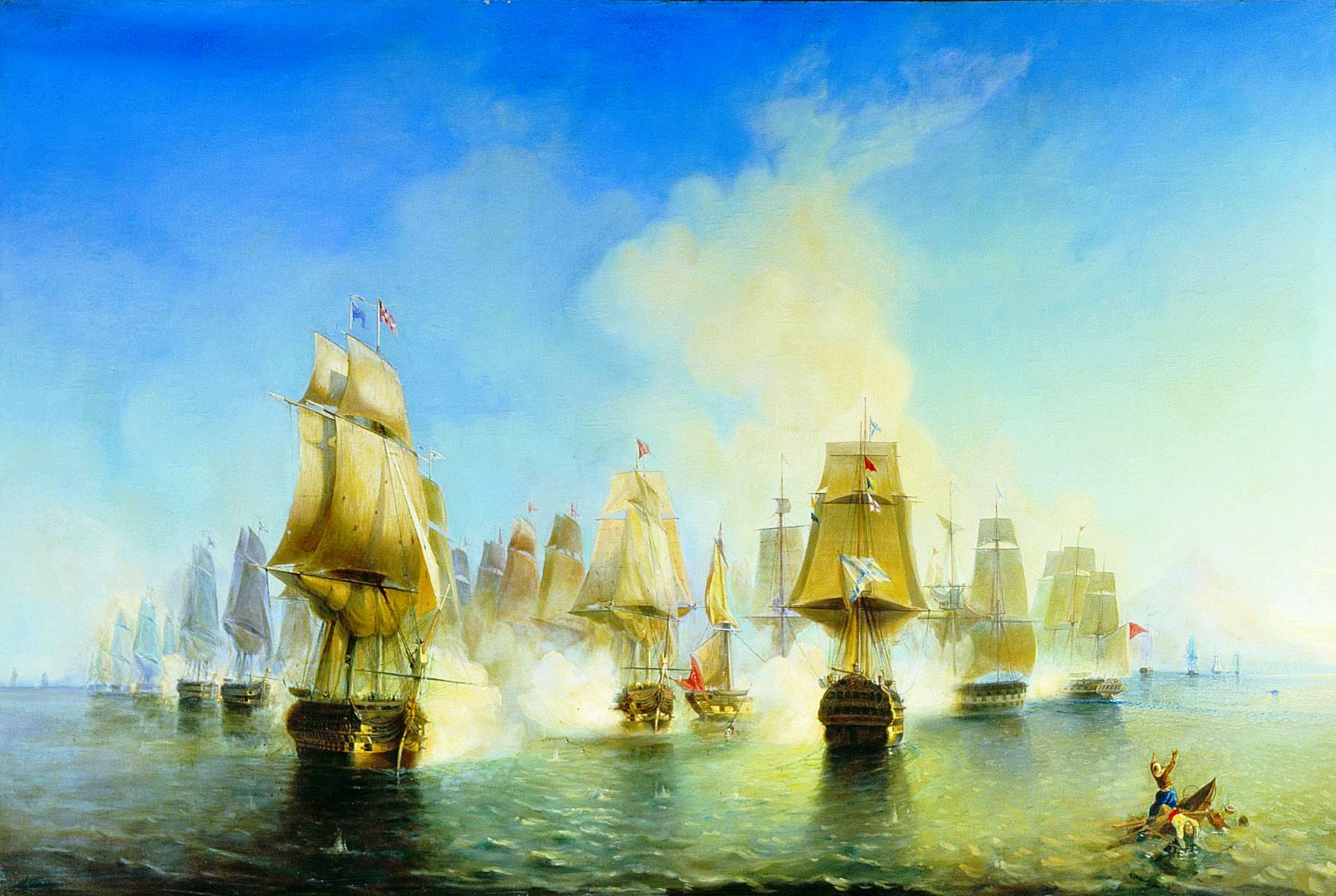
Battle of Athos

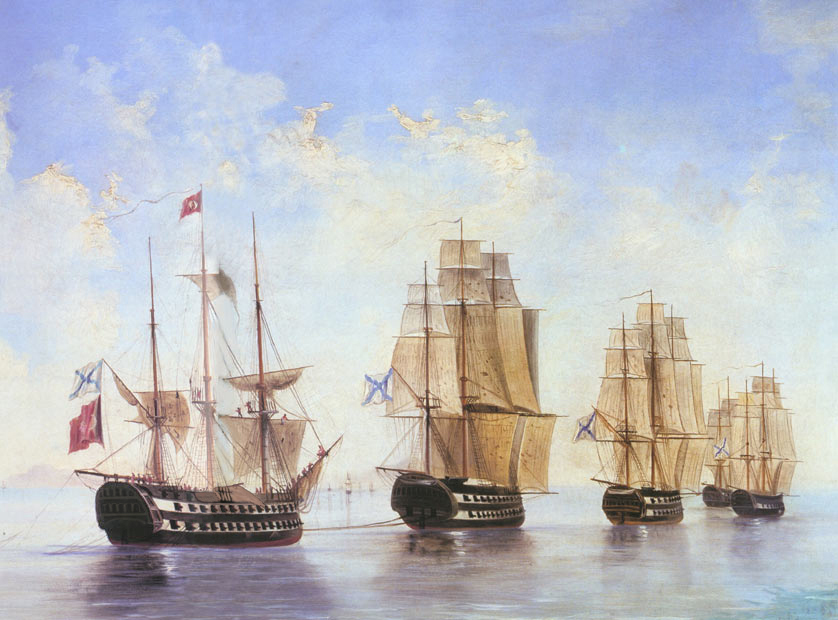
Senyavin's squadron after the Battle of Athos

Contrary to his expectations, British Admiral Sir John Thomas Duckworth, who had just engaged in the unsuccessful Dardanelles operation, refused to join his own fleet with Senyavin's and embarked upon Alexandria expedition of 1807 instead. The Russians were to fight the outnumbering Turks in the Aegean without foreign support.

Senyavin's blockade of their capital eventually drove the Turks to extremes. After food riots broke out, Sultan Selim III was replaced with Mustafa IV, who ordered his fleet to break the blockade. The Ottoman ships clashed with Senyavin's squadron in the Battle of the Dardanelles (May 11) and the Battle of Athos (June 16). Both engagements were Russian victories, and ensured Russia's ascendancy in the Aegean for the rest of the war.

== Lisbon incident ==
Upon receiving news about the Treaty of Tilsit, Senyavin was reported to have been overcome with tears (12 August). All of his conquests had to be forfeited after the international situation had been reversed dramatically: Napoleon was now considered Russia's ally and Britain was Russia's foe. On 14 August, he and Lord Collingwood reluctantly parted ways. Eight days later, a large part of the Russian squadron (five ships of the line, four frigates, four corvettes, and four brigs) was ordered to return to Sevastopol. Senyavin was to lead the remaining fleet to the Baltic, where the Finnish War with Sweden was already brewing.

Tenedos was evacuated on 25 August and Senyavin set sail from Corfu on 19 September. Although he planned to proceed directly to Saint Petersburg, stormy weather induced him to enter the Tagus River and cast anchor in Lisbon on 30 October. Within several days, John VI of Portugal fled to the Portuguese colony of Brazil and the Royal Navy blockaded Lisbon, intercepting a Russian sloop as an enemy vessel since the Anglo-Russian War had broken out. In November, French forces under Jean-Andoche Junot overran the Portuguese capital and Senyavin found himself in a precious diplomatic situation.

In the tricky situation, Senyavin distinguished himself as a skilled diplomat and managed to save his ships from destruction. Upon hearing about his plight, Napoleon extorted from the tsar the privilege of giving orders to Senyavin through the Russian embassy in Paris. He immediately demanded to replace British officers serving in Senyavin's squadron with French or German officers and advised Senyavin to exchange several ships with Junot. Napoleon's orders were politely ignored by Senyavin, who had no intention to risk the lives of his marines in pointless warfare against erstwhile friends and consequently professed his neutrality.

In July 1808, Senyavin's ships, still blockaded in Lisbon by the Royal Navy, were repeatedly visited by Junot and General François Étienne de Kellermann, who exhorted him to assist in their military operations against the Portuguese and Spanish. Senyavin responded that he had not been authorized by the tsar to fight the peoples his country was not at war with, and neither promises nor threats would make him change his mind.

In August, the French were beaten by the Arthur Wellesley at the Battle of Vimeiro and were forced to leave Portugal. Senyavin's seven ships of the line and one frigate were blockaded by a British squadron of 15 ships of the line and 10 frigates under Sir Charles Cotton. They could have easily annihilated the Russian squadron if Senyavin refused to surrender. The Russian admiral, however, maintained his neutrality, threatening to blow up the ships and set Lisbon ablaze in case of attack. At last, a convention was signed with Cotton whereby the Russian squadron was to be escorted by the Royal Navy to London without lowering their colors. Moreover, Senyavin was to assume supreme command of the joint Anglo-Russian fleet (as the senior officer of the two), while two Russian ships (Rafail and Yaroslav) were to be left in Lisbon for repairs.

On 31 August, Senyavin's squadron embarked from Portugal for Portsmouth. On 27 September, the squadron arrived at Portsmouth with their flags streaming, as if in times of peace. The Lord Mayor of London, Sir Charles Flower, 1st Baronet, declared the agreement negotiated with Senyavin disreputable for Britain's prestige, and many in the Admiralty shared his opinion. Senyavin's squadron was therefore detained in Portsmouth under various pretexts until winter, when the weather made their return to the Baltic impossible. In the next year, the departure was further delayed by the Walcheren Expedition. On 5 August 1809, Senyavin's squadron was allowed to leave Portsmouth for Riga and arrived there on 9 September.

== Fall from grace and later career ==
Senyavin's disobedience to the tsars and his actions during his journey resulted in him not being employed again at sea, as well being disgraced at the imperial court upon his return. During Napoleon's invasion of Russia, he once more administered the peaceful port of Reval and was given no chance to take part in hostilities, despite his regular petitions to let him muster a militia in his native province.

Although he settled into retirement in the next year, Senyavin's name remained so popular in the Navy that the Decembrist conspirators planned to make him a member of the Provisional Government after staging a palace revolution. When the Greek War of Independence broke out in 1821, Greek insurgents requested the tsar to send "the famous Senyavin" to their assistance, but their petition was rejected.

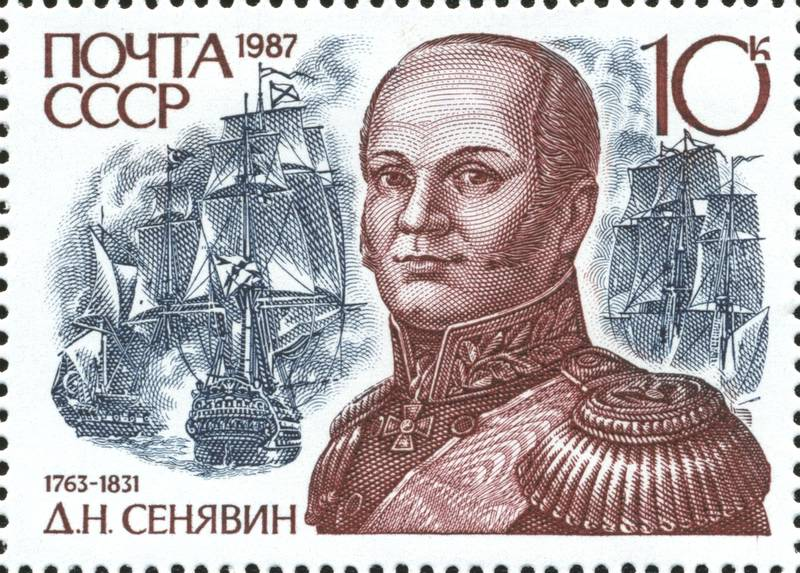
A Soviet postage stamp of 1987 commemorating Senyavin

It was not until Alexander I's death in 1825 that Senyavin was recalled to active service. As Russia was preparing to resume hostilities against Turkey, Nicholas I of Russia, recalling him to active duty in 1826–1829, as he was appointed to command the Baltic Fleet. The following year, he was promoted full Admiral and accompanied Login Geiden's squadron heading for the Mediterranean, where combined Anglo-Franco-Russian forces would score the great victory at Navarino.

Dmitry Senyavin died three years later and was interred with great pomp, in the presence of the tsar, at the Alexander Nevsky Lavra. He had several ships named after him in the Imperial and Soviet navies, notably the vessel used for the three-year expedition ordered by Nicholas I in 1826. The Senyavin Islands in Oceania and the promontories in Alaska and Sakhalin still commemorate his name.

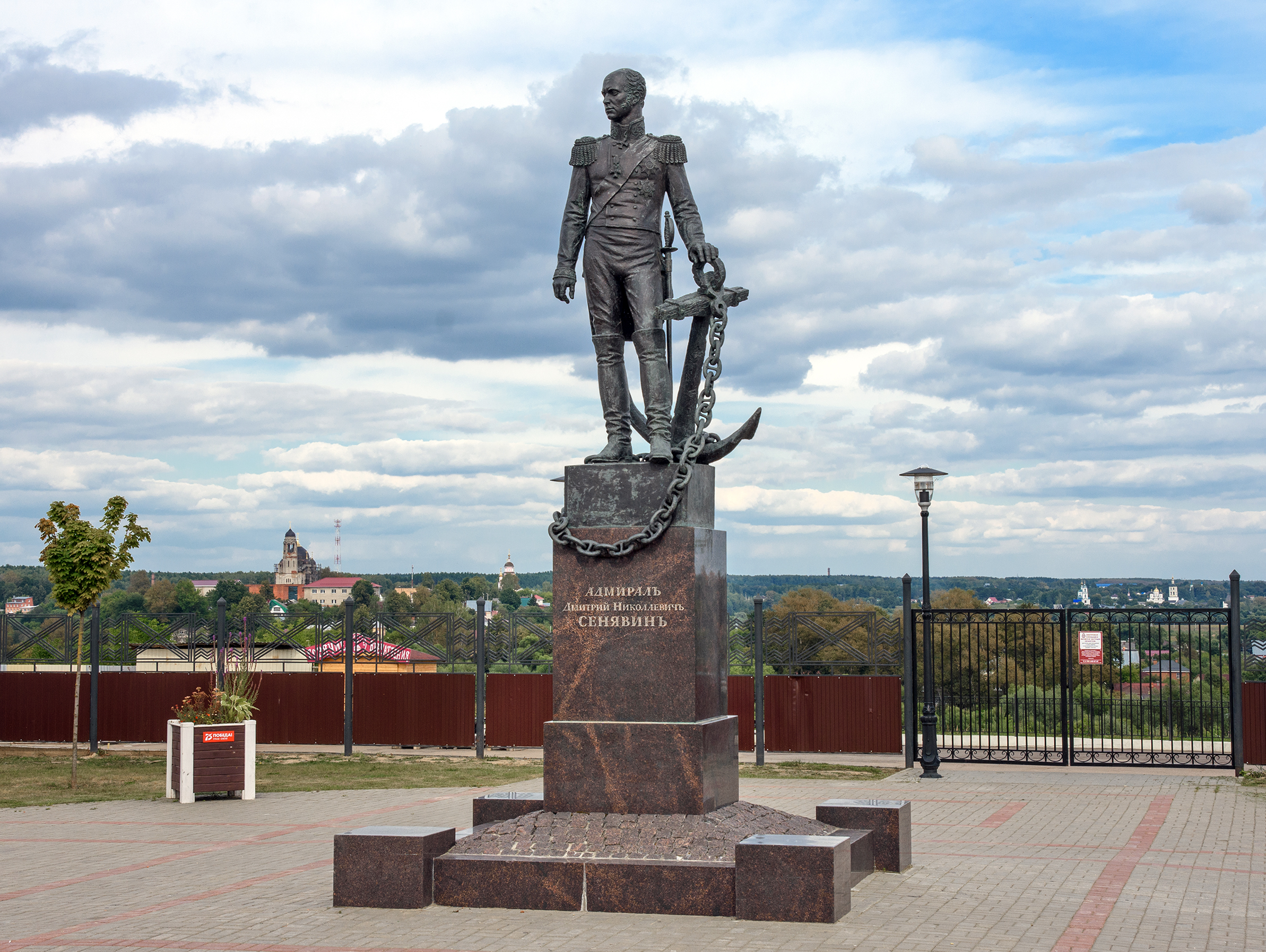
Monument to Admiral Senyavin in Borovsk, sculptor Mikhail Pereyaslavets
