= Samuil Greig =

Russian general and finance minister (1827–1887)

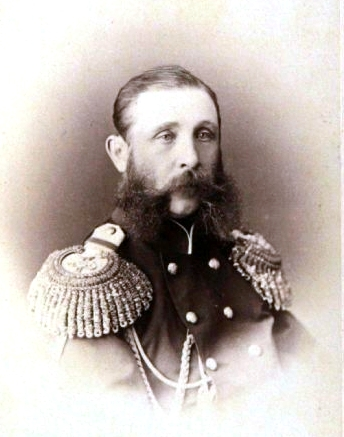
Samuil Greig

Samuil Alekseevich Greig (Russian: Самуи́л Алексе́евич Грейг; 1827–1887), born into the Greig family, was a full general and adjutant general in the Imperial Russian Army. He served during the Hungarian Revolution of 1848, and during the Crimean War was in Battle of Alma and Battle of Inkerman. He was the State Comptroller from 1874 to 1878, and Minister of Finance of the Russian Empire from 1878 to 1880.

Political offices
Preceded by Mikhail Reytern	Finance Minister; 1878–1880	Succeeded by Alexander Abaza
