= Taillear Dubh na Tuaighe =

Scottish chief of Taylor sept

- Donald Cameron is alluded to in the supporters on the coat of arms of the chief of Clan Cameron
- Born: about 1550
- Other names: Black Taylor of the Axe (Gaelic: Taillear Dubh na Tuaighe)
- Known for: Chieftain of the Taylor sept of Clan Cameron

Donald Cameron (born c. 1550), known as Black Taylor of the Axe (Scottish Gaelic Taillear Dubh na Tuaighe) was a famed warrior of the Scottish Highlands during the reign of Mary, Queen of Scots. Born illegitimate, his father was Ewen Cameron of Lochiel, 14th chief of Clan Cameron, and his mother was the daughter of the chief of Clan MacDougall. Donald Cameron is claimed as the eponymous ancestor of the Taylor sept of Clan Cameron. He is alluded to in the coat of arms of the chief of Clan Cameron, as a likeness of him appears as the supporters holding a Lochaber axe.

== Childhood ==
After Donald's birth, Ewen kept his son, and had him nursed by a tailor's wife at Lundavra in Lochaber ("Cameron country"). There, as an infant, Donald received the nickname An Taillear Dubh (an, a diminutive; Taillear, an occupational reference to the caretaker's husband; Dubh, translated as "black" in the context of meaning "dark haired" or "dark tempered").

Ewen died in captivity in 1553, prisoner of the chief of Clan MacDougall who was holding Ewen captive until such time as he agreed to marry the chief's daughter. Acknowledgement of Donald's parentage did not suffice according to laws of hereditary succession, the consequence being that Ewen, an unmarried man, died without "legitimate issue". The title of 15th chief of Clan Cameron passed instead to Ewen's younger brother, Donald Cameron of Lochiel. As for property, Donald did not inherit his father's lands, as Queen Mary – unhappy with Ewen's fighting history and lack of obedience towards her summons – granted all of Ewen's lands to George Gordon, 4th Earl of Huntly.

== Warrior ==
Donald was raised by Corunan MacLachlans, the earliest cadet branch of Strathlachlan to leave Cowal, and hereditary standard-bearers to Cameron of Lochiel. Corunan was located midway between Fort William and Corran of Ardgour in Lochaber, and it was here that Donald developed skills with the fighting weapon of his area, the Lochaber axe, using it when Camerons battled.

The 15th chief of Clan Cameron died without legitimate issue in 1569. His younger brother, John, would have been next in line of hereditary succession, but had recently died, thereby John's infant son, Allan Cameron of Lochiel (born 1567/68), became 16th chief of Clan Cameron. Soon thereafter, around 1570, the Battle of Bun Garbhain pitted Camerons against their principal rival Clan Mackintosh. It was here that Donald, with his Lochaber axe, became a Cameron hero for slaying Mackintosh of Mackintosh, 15th chief of Clan Mackintosh, earning Donald the nickname Taillear Dubh na Tuaighe.

When Donald went to Allan's family with news of this battle, Allan's mother, daughter of the slain Mackintosh chief, became enraged, and attempted to kill baby Allan. Donald intervened in time, saving the young 16th chief of Clan Cameron, another heroic act, but Allan's mother was banished from Lochaber forever.

Fighting was not limited to clan against clan. Because of his youth, Allan was vulnerable to being usurped by a Cameron cadet branch (distant family). Ewen Cameron of Erracht, uncle of the 14th chief of Clan Cameron, became suspect and so it was that in the 1580s, Donald's men, Cameron of Lochiel, murdered Ewan Cameron of Erracht in battle at Inverlochy Castle on behalf of young Allen, and retaining the line of hereditary succession for Camerons of Lochiel.

== Legacy ==
Cameron-Mackintosh fighting continued to be bloody. Eventually, Donald fled with his family and followers to Cowal and found safety. His descendants settled in Strath Eachaig where they were known as Mac-an-taillear ("son of the tailor"). By the 18th century, his descendants carried the surnames MacInTaillear, Macintaylor, Taylor and Tayler and still lived on the Cowal peninsula. They referred to Donald with endearment as Taillear Dubh, while referring to themselves as Clann an Taillear Dhuibh Chamronaich ("Children of the Black Taylor of the Camerons").(Mackenzie, 1875, pages 526-530)

Donald's legacy is preserved in the double black lines of the Taylor sept's tartan, designed in 1955 by Lt.Col. Iain B. Cameron.
