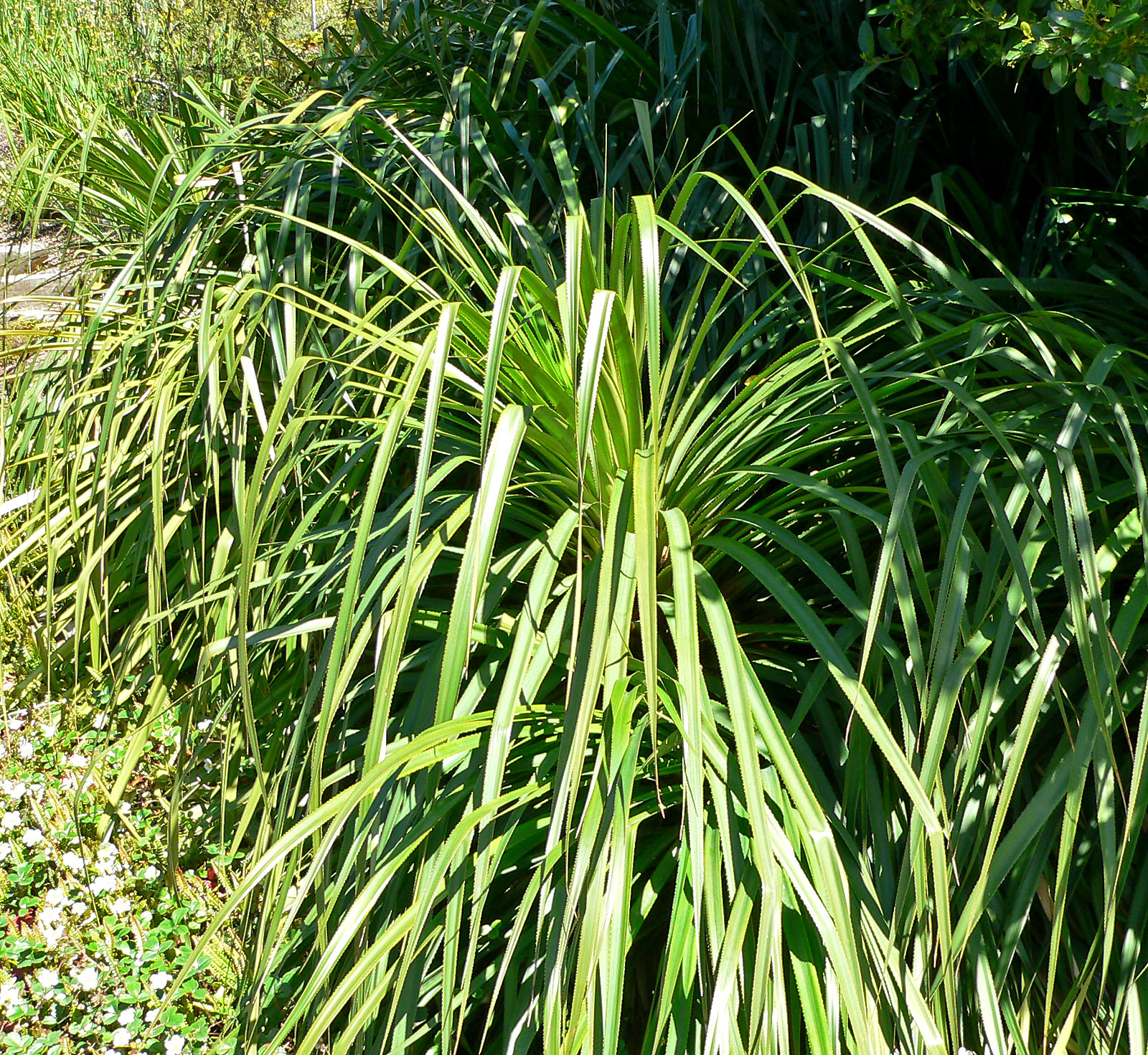
- Greigia sphacelata

Scientific classification
- Kingdom: Plantae
- Clade: Tracheophytes
- Clade: Angiosperms
- Clade: Monocots
- Clade: Commelinids
- Order: Poales
- Family: Bromeliaceae
- Subfamily: Bromelioideae
- Genus: Greigia; Regel

Synonyms
- Hesperogreigia Skottsb.

= Greigia =

Genus of flowering plants

Greigia is a genus of plants in the family Bromeliaceae, subfamily Bromelioideae. It is native to Latin America from Mexico to Chile. The genus is named in honour of Major General Samuel Alexjewitsch Greig, president of the Russian Horticultural Society in 1865.

Greigias are unique among bromeliads in that they do not die after flowering. Instead, they continue to bloom every year from the same rosette.

== Species ==
- Greigia acebeyi B.Will, T.Krömer, M.Kessler, Karger & H.Luther - Bolivia
- Greigia alborosea (Grisebach) Mez - Venezuela
- Greigia aristeguietae L.B. Smith - Venezuela
- Greigia atrobrunnea H. Luther - Ecuador
- Greigia atrocastanea H. Luther - Bolivia
- Greigia berteroi Skottsberg - Juan Fernández Islands
- Greigia cochabambae H. Luther - Bolivia
- Greigia collina L.B. Smith - Cundinamarca
- Greigia columbiana L.B. Smith - Costa Rica, Panama, Colombia, Ecuador, Venezuela
- Greigia danielii L.B. Smith - Colombia, Bolivia
- Greigia exserta L.B. Smith - Colombia
- Greigia kessleri H. Luther - Bolivia
- Greigia landbeckii (Lechler ex Philippi) Philippi - Chile
- Greigia leymebambana H. Luther - Peru
- Greigia macbrideana L.B. Smith - Peru
- Greigia marioi B.Will, T.Krömer, M.Kessler, Karger & H.Luther - Bolivia
- Greigia membranacea B.Will, T.Krömer, M.Kessler, Karger & H.Luther - Bolivia
- Greigia mulfordii L.B. Smith - Colombia, Ecuador
- Greigia nubigena L.B. Smith - Colombia
- Greigia oaxacana L.B. Smith - Oaxaca, Chiapas
- Greigia ocellata L.B. Smith & Steyermark - Venezuela
- Greigia pearcei Mez - Chile
- Greigia racinae L.B. Smith - Colombia
- Greigia raporum H. Luther - Peru
- Greigia rohwederi L.B. Smith, O. Rohweder - El Salvador, Honduras
- Greigia sanctae-martae L.B. Smith - Colombia
- Greigia sodiroana Mez - Ecuador
- Greigia sphacelata (Ruiz & Pavón) Regel - Chile
- Greigia stenolepis L.B. Smith - Colombia, Ecuador, Bolivia
- Greigia steyermarkii L.B. Smith - Guatemala, Honduras
- Greigia sylvicola Standley - Costa Rica, Panama
- Greigia tillettii L.B. Smith & R.W. Read - Venezuela
- Greigia van-hyningii L.B. Smith - Veracruz, Oaxaca, Chiapas
- Greigia vilcabambae H. Luther - Peru
- Greigia vulcanica André - Colombia, Ecuador
