= Seydi Ali Pasha =

Seydi Ali Pasha (died 1820 or 1821) was an Ottoman grand admiral born in Georgia and was a brother of Ali Al-Tarabulus. He lived in Algeria and later moved to serve in Istanbul. He served as Kapudan Pasha (grand admiral of the Ottoman navy) from 1807 to 23 August 1808, and from 22 November 1808 to 10 April 1809. He was also the governor of Silistra Eyalet from 23 August 1808 to sometime later that year.

According to Mehmet Sureyya he was from Georgia. After his last office, he was exiled to modern-day Afyonkarahisar in western Anatolia.

== See also ==
- List of Kapudan Pashas
