= Siege of Lemnos =

Siege of Lemnos may refer to:

- Siege of Lemnos (1657), during the Cretan War of 1645–1669
- Siege of Lemnos (1770), during the Russo-Turkish War of 1768–1774
