= Battle of Nauplia =

Battle of Nauplia or Siege of Nauplia can refer to one of the following military engagements that took place at or near the port city of Nauplia (Nafplio) in Greece:

- Siege of Nauplia (1205–12) by the Crusaders
- Siege of Nauplia (1686) by the Venetians
- Siege of Nauplia (1715) by the Ottomans
- Battle of Nauplia (1770), between the Russian and Ottoman fleets
- Siege of Nauplia (1821–22) by the Greeks
- Battle of Nauplia (1822), between the Greek and Ottoman fleets
