= Siege of Ochakov (1788) =

1788 battle of the Russo-Turkish War (1787–1792)

- Part of the Russo-Turkish War (1787–1792)
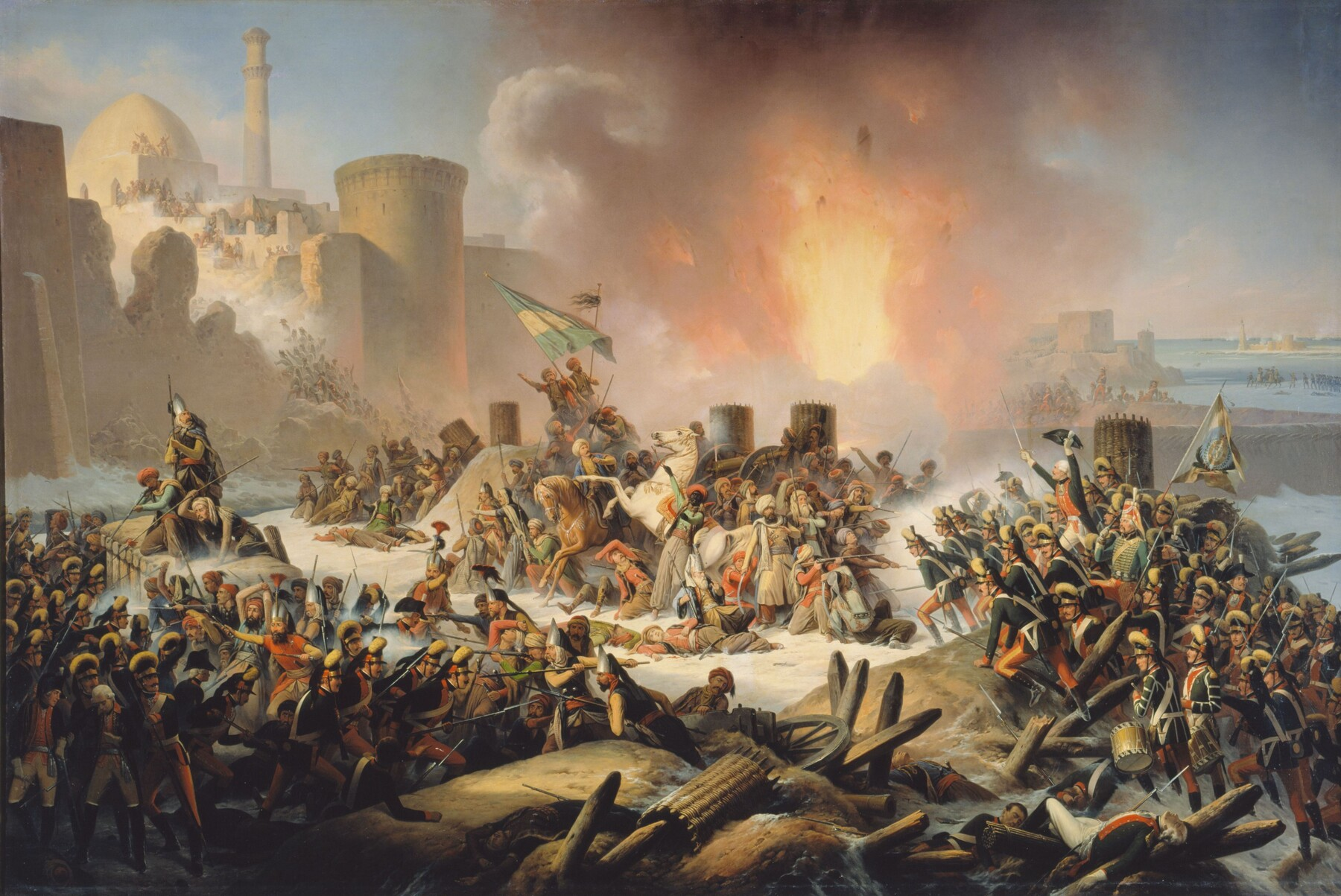
- The Siege of the Fortress Ochakov on December 1788; January Suchodolski, 1853
Date	May 20 – December 6 (N.S.: May 31 – Dec. 17), 1788
Location	Özi, Ottoman Empire (now Ochakiv, Ukraine) 46.6186°N 31.5392°E
Result	Russian victory Full results: Ottoman victory – Naval action of 31 May; Russian victory – Naval battle of 18 June; Russian victory – Naval battle of 28 June; Ottoman victory – Sortie of 7 Aug.; Russian victory – Storming of Ochakov

Belligerents
Russia	Ottoman Empire

Commanders and leaders
(Russian Empire) Grigori Potemkin (Russian Empire) Alexander Suvorov (WIA) (Russian Empire) Charles-Henri-Othon de Nassau-Siegen (Russian Empire) John Paul Jones	Hüseyin Pasha (POW); Cezayirli Gazi Hasan Pasha

Strength
40,000	20,000

Casualties and losses
Final assault: 2,785–3,000 to 6,000 (956–1,000 killed and 1,829–5,000 wounded); Total: 15,000	Final assault: 12,700–13,500 (8,700 to 9,500 killed, >4,000 captured); Total: 20,000 dead (city garrison); Loss at sea: 18 ships or vessels, 7,800+ men

The siege of Ochakov (Russian: осада Очакова) or the siege of Özi (Turkish: Özi Kuşatması), now Ochakiv, Ukraine, was one of the major events of the Russo-Turkish War (1787–1792). The Ochakov Fortress had the appearance of an irregular quadrangle, consisting of low bastions with a dry moat and glacis on the dry side, and a simple stone wall on the sea side. In addition, 10 advanced lunettes built later extended from the dry side. From the sea, fort Hasan Paşa reinforced the defense. By the time the Russians began the siege, the fortress was a strong fence, but was not able to withstand an active, energetic storming for long. Ochakov was not what it was in the old days, under Münnich in 1737, but it still did not represent an impregnable stronghold that required enormous preparations and expenditure of time. Besieging in summer and autumn, with the arrival of winter, the supreme commander Potemkin decided to stop the siege works and begin the storming of Ochakov (Russian: штурм Очакова) on 17 December [O.S. 6 December] 1788, which ended in Russian success and capture of Hüseyin Pasha, the chief of garrison.

In 1788, Russian forces led by the commander in chief Prince Grigory Potemkin, General Alexander Suvorov, who was called here from near Kinburn Spit with his Phanagorian Regiment and commanded the left wing (until injury and replacement), Prince Nikolai Repnin (the center) and Ivan Möller (the right wing) besieged the city, held by Ottoman troops massively assisted at sea by Hasan Pasha, whose knowledge exceeded the Turkish military level of that time, and commanded by Hüseyin Pasha. Despite Suvorov's urging to storm the city immediately, Potemkin had the Russian forces encircle Ochakov (Özi), bombarding the city and cutting off the defenders' supply of food and ammunition. By keeping his soldiers out of direct battle, Potemkin strove to minimize Russian combat-casualties, though he was accused by his generals, including Suvorov, of cowardice, and the Turks organized several sorties from the fortress and in everyway interfered with the siege at sea. The argument within the Russian headquarters about storming Ochakov continued during the entirety of the siege. The rowing flotilla was commanded by Prince Karl (Charles) Nassau-Siegen, the sailing fleet by Paul Jones, a fighter for American independence; the latter stood in subordination of the first. There was no great agreement between them. Nassau and Jones were subordinate to Potemkin.

At the siege's beginning, Russian Captain Christian Osten-Sacken died in a difficult situation at the naval combat action of 31 May 1788, being surrounded, and blowing up his own reconnaissance warship along with himself after evacuating the crew. There were pretty large naval battle of 18 June 1788 and battle of 28 June 1788. In the second, the most successful for the Russians, the Turks lost 16 ships/vessels thanks to the joint actions of Nassau's flotilla and Suvorov's coastal artillery. In a daring sortie of 7 August 1788, the Turks under Hüseyin Pasha managed to rout Suvorov's troops, who was seriously wounded and gave his post to General Bibikov.

== Before the siege ==
Potemkin maintained correspondence with Suvorov, treating him with favor and trust; he reported political news, sent samples of variable weapons and equipment, congratulated him on holidays. Once he sent him his greatcoat, asking him to wear it instead of a dressing gown. There were very good relations between them. Among other things, he subordinated rowboats to Suvorov, the command of which he entrusted to Prince Nassau-Siegen. Initially, the Russian fleet was far inferior in strength to Turkey and consisted of light ships.

== Encounter ==
The first combat was on May 31 (O.S. 20 May), with the arrival of the Turkish navy off Ochakov coast. The Russian flotilla lost a double-sloop, a reconnaissance vessel sent from Glubokaya to Kinburn, which was surrounded and attacked while attempting to retreat. The sloop's commander, Captain Lieutenant Osten-Sacken, ordered the crew to save themselves by swimming and blew it up along with himself. There is information—historian Alexander Petrushevsky considered it unreliable—that the Turkish ship grappled with the sloop was also blown up and that this heroic act brought panic to the Turks. Be that as it may, the Turkish fleet remained inactive until 18 June (O.S. 7 June).

A heated battle ensued on 18 June, which ended late at night with failure for the Turks. Two of their ships were blown up, a third caught fire, and 18 were damaged. Russian losses were negligible, the number of damaged ships is unknown. Nassau's rowing flotilla was instrumental in the battle and Admiral Jones own report to Potemkin described the following:

"At eight o’clock, when the Prince of Nassau and I were in a Cutter, looking over our position and reconnoitering a little closer to our enemy, their Flotilla began to fire on us very vigorously. At the same time the first division of their Flotilla advanced along Shore and attacked our reserve, stationed between our ships and the Coast. We took their fire for some time without response, but, seeing the engagement was growing serious, I did my best to help the Prince make the necessary manoeuvres. Then I hurried along the line to bring up all the Batteries and other boats of the Flotilla. . . .The Turks, on their part, had brought up the second division of their Flotilla, and 1 hoped for some time that this would be a decisive battle; but the arrival of our Second division on the Battle-line put the Turks to rout and, with the wind against Us, we pursued them as far as their Squadron. . . . The Prince showed great coolness and intelligence . . . Mr. Alexiano came in another Cutter and helped us preserve good Order. ... I was greatly pleased by the conduct of the officers; they were brave and orderly; and I do not think the Captain Pasha [Hassan el Ghazi], who commanded in person, will eat his dinner with pleasure".

The Turkish flotilla of light ships was stopped along the Ochakov coast. At the action of 18 June, both the numerical strength of the Turkish fleet and the personal qualities of Hasan Pasha served as a guarantee for the fact that the Turks were not broken. Suvorov did not lose sight of this consideration and assessed the importance of Kinburn spit.

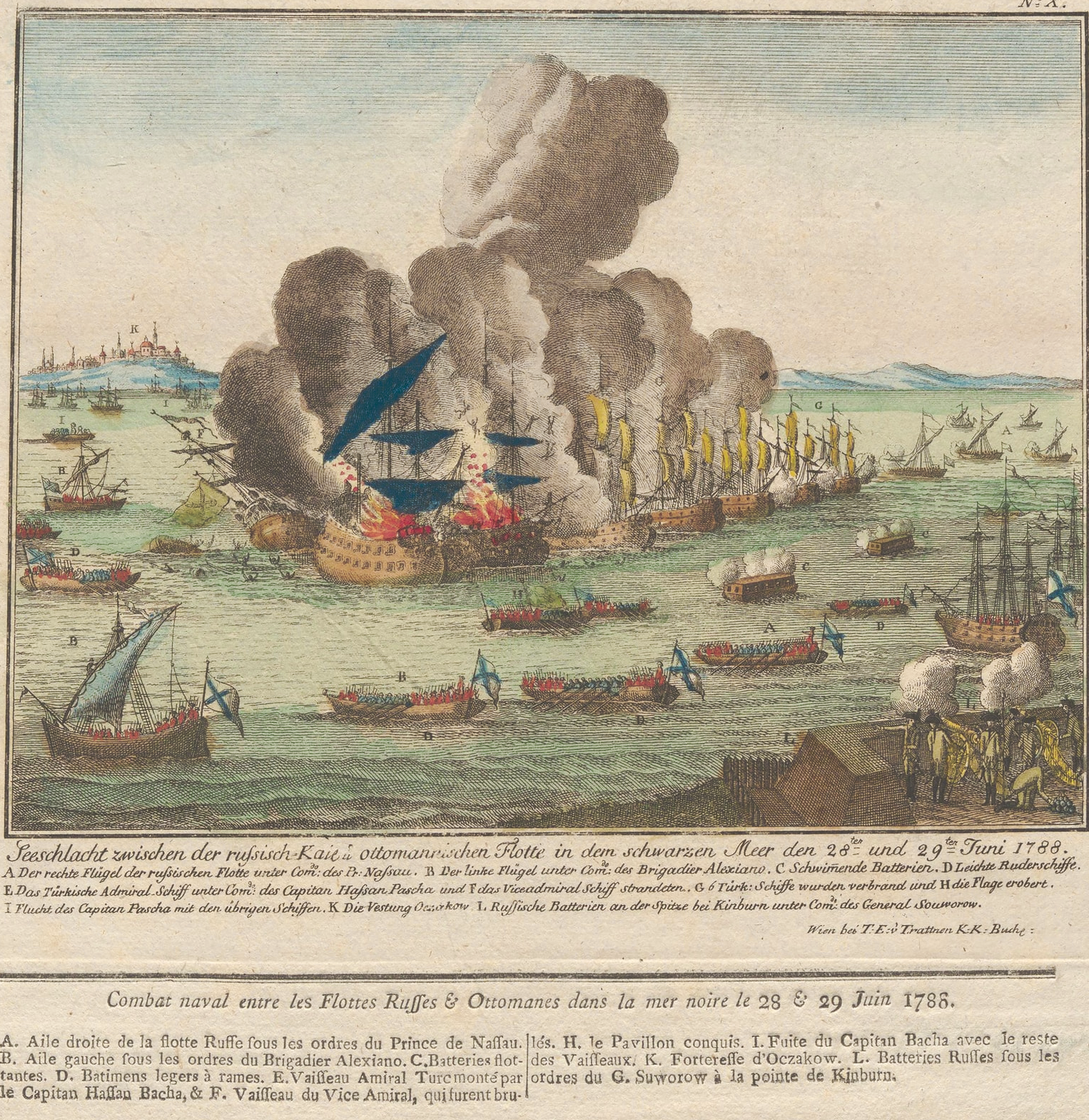
Naval combat between the Russian & Ottoman Fleets in the Black Sea on 28 & 29 June 1788.

Suvorov heavily armed the Kinburn Spit, recently withheld by him from a Turkish storming, with artillery batteries. Hasan Pasha was actively eager and preparing for the sea battle. However, he was late, because the night before the battle, 22 new armed vessels arrived from Kremenchug to reinforce the Russian flotilla. Suvorov's batteries helped to sink 7 ships on 28 June (O.S. 17 June). On this day, when the naval battle became fierce and continued without any advantage in either direction until one Turkish ship was blown up. This caused panic among the Turks, and all their ships rushed under the fortress, except for the Kapudan Pasha Hasan's flagship. The Russian rowboats, noticing its solitude, surrounded and captured it; only Hasan Pasha managed to escape. A disorderly flight began; the Prince of Nassau pursued. With the help of Suvorov's coastal artillery, 15 ships and other vessels were eliminated in total, one ship was captured, up to 6,000 men were killed, wounded, and drowned, about 1,800 were captured. The Russians lost under 100 men here. A few days later, Hasan Pasha again entered the liman to rescue the ships remaining near Ochakov, but Suvorov drove him away with fire from his batteries.

The Russian army began assaulting the city on July 9.

Upon arrival at Ochakov, Suvorov immediately made reconnaissance and ordered the destruction of the remnants of the Turkish flotilla stationed near the fortress, which was carried out on 12 July (O.S. 1 July) with complete success. Potemkin's inactivity produced results directly opposite to those he had hoped for. The Turks were emboldened, spreading out over the vineyards and gardens bordering Ochakov. They made several attempts to break the siege and made it difficult to open siege works by making small but frequent sorties. On 7 August (O.S. 27 July), about 5,000 Janissaries attacked positions held by Cossacks and forced them to retreat. Suvorov personally led reinforcement of 2 grenadier battalions, and the Turks also received reinforcements. Colonel Zolotukhin brought another grenadier battalion, charging with bayonets. They drove the Janissaries to the gates of Ochakov without Potemkin's permission. Several more Russian battalions arrived, and the Turks also arrived; the battle flared up fiercely under one of the Ottoman retrenchments. The day before, a young baptized Turk who knew Suvorov by sight had escaped from the Russian camp. This fugitive had noticed Suvorov in battle and pointed him out to a Turkish marksman; he took aim, the bullet pierced Suvorov's neck and stopped at the back of his head. Suvorov felt the wound, declared it dangerous, and handed over command to Lieutenant General Bibikov. The Russian troops were broken and driven back in disarray. According to Russian data, the Russians lost 365 killed and wounded here. Suvorov's guilt on 7 August is justified, but it was Potemkin either, who did not support the attack. The Prince of Ligne at the main Russian headquarters, noticing how, in the heat of battle, the Turkish flags had stretched to their right flank, leaving the left-flank fortifications virtually undefended, proposed an immediate assault. Potemkin refused. He sent Suvorov orders to cease the battle and retreat four times, and the last time, he sent the duty general with a stern question: "how could he, Suvorov, dare to initiate such an important undertaking without orders?" At that moment, a bullet had been removed from Suvorov's neck and the wound was being bandaged. After listening to the messenger, he replied with poetry:

Sitting on a stone so cold,
Watching Ochakov as of old.

There was another attempted Turkish breakout that month that led to a stalemate between two armies. Catherine was informed about the unsuccessful action. Passing this news to one of her secretaries of state, she said:

"Suvorov was naughty; rushing in without permission, he lost about 400 men and was wounded himself; he was certainly drunk."

After all that had happened, Suvorov's state of health did not allow to remain at his post near Ochakov. On the third or fourth day he left for Kinburn, as he himself explains, to keep an eye on the enemy fleet and, after the capture of Ochakov, not to let it into the liman. He arrived there ill, fainting followed fainting, he was feverish, breathing was difficult, jaundice appeared. The illness threatened a bad outcome, but the patient slept well. They called a council, examined the wound again and made a second dressing, since the first one had been hastily applied poorly. The wound turned out to be inflamed and unclean: several pieces of cloth and lining were removed from it. Then an improvement began, and in a month Suvorov recovered. Suvorov endured excruciating physical and mental anxiety. He tried to appease Potemkin, wrote to him vaguely, in hints and half-phrases, apparently restraining himself and searching for words; but he succeeded only partially.

Suvorov had already begun to recover, when on the morning of 29 August (O.S. 18 August), a blow was heard in Kinburn, followed by the many other blows of lesser force. It was an explosion in a laboratory where bombs were being loaded for the Ochakov army at that time, with the commandant's permission, without Suvorov's knowledge. The loaded bombs and grenades were thrown in different directions and exploded in rotation. But Suvorov learned all this later, and at the moment of the explosion he could not figure out what had happened. Jumping up from his chair, despite his weakness, he ran to the door; at that moment a bomb flew into the room, exploded, tore down part of the wall and smashed the bed; pieces of torn-off woodchips wounded Suvorov in the face, chest, arm and leg. He ran out through the lobby onto the stairs, and since they were also smashed, he went down the railing into the yard. A thick cloud of gunpowder smoke hung over Kinburn and for a time turned what was then a clear day almost into night. Confusion arose in the fortress; everyone was terrified. A large number of people suffered, including several people who lived under the same roof with Suvorov. The commandant was brought to Suvorov covered in blood; in the church, before the altar, the priest was mortally wounded. Up to 80 were killed, including those working on the bombs, so the cause of the explosion remained unknown. By a coincidence, the barrels of gunpowder, which were in the same room, remained intact, otherwise the entire fortress would have suffered. Nevertheless, the effect of the explosion was so great that Hüseyin Pasha in command in Ochakov sent an invitation to Hasan Pasha to take advantage of the opportunity and make a landing on the Kinburn Spit. Kapudan Pasha refused; he understood that the success of such an enterprise was more than doubtful.

Beginning on August 6 (O.S. July 26), Potemkin began constructing artillery batteries to prevent the Turks from occupying local gardens, which greatly hindered the further progress of the siege.

On November 18 (O.S. Nov. 7), 1788, the Russians captured the strategically important Pirezin (Berezan) Island.

During the latter half of 1788, while Russian forces were besieging Ochakov, flag captain Dmitry Senyavin executed a successful sabotage operation off the coast of Anatolia. Turkish fleet was distracted after being attacked by Senyavin's division, who also destroyed about 10 merchant ships. In December 1788, Senyavin received the Order of St. George, 4th class.

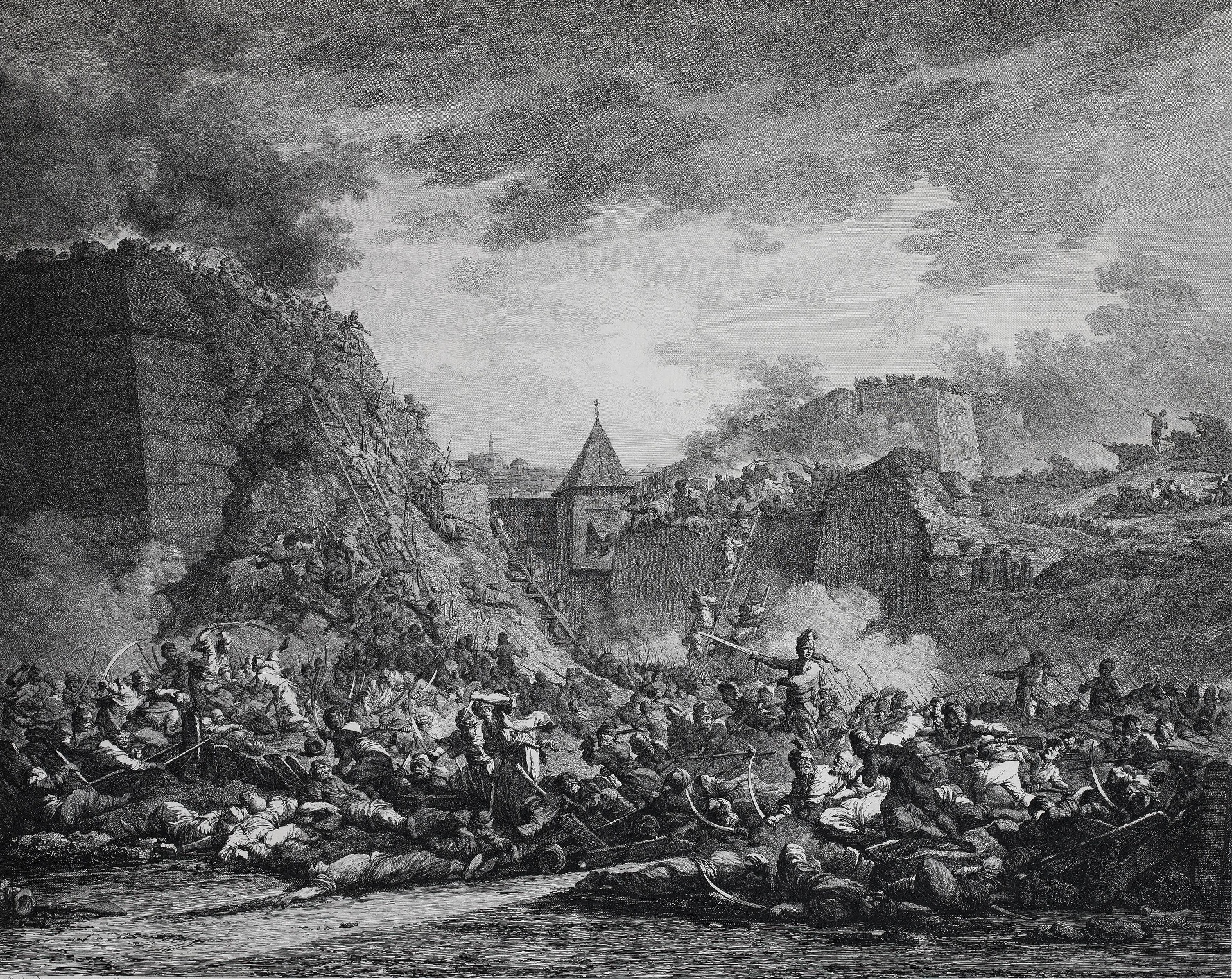
Storming of Ochakov by Adam Bartsch

It was deep autumn. Previously, life had been in full swing in the camp and headquarters; the company was numerous, there were many visiting ladies; feasts and balls were given, music thundered, various rare provisions were brought from everywhere by specially sent messengers to Potemkin's table. Things were not moving forward, but they were living happily. Now this too had passed; the inclement weather had driven away some, the long wait for the outcome — others. Potemkin became more gloomy with each passing day. Then the wet cold autumn gave way to a fierce winter, which for a long time remained in the people's memory under the name of "Ochakov winter." Mortality became extreme, with 30–40 people dying per day from the cold alone. The conditions of both armies continued to decline, with the looming threat of disease and increasingly cold weather. Potemkin ultimately gave in to Suvorov's arguments for an assault on Ochakov. On the night of December 6 (December 17 in the Gregorian calendar), the Russians attacked. Ivan Möller was responsible for the troop disposition; acting in accordance with it, Potemkin's troops took Ochakov. Major General Peter Pahlen's column broke through the Turkish fortifications between the city and Hasan Pasha's palace, then the palace itself and the retrenchments. Major General Volkonsky's column captured the central fortifications. Lieutenant General Prince Dolgorukov's column broke through to the fortress gates. The fifth and sixth columns also broke through the fortifications and reached the fortress bastions. The sixth column's reserves approached the fortress's southern wall across the ice of the liman, then the grenadiers, under cover of cannon fire, scaled the wall and captured it. Over 9,500 Turks were killed during the assault, and more than 4,000 were taken prisoner, including Hüseyin Pasha himself. Most of the city garrison was killed in the street fight. It lost about 20,000 men in all siege, or more simply, was destroyed. The Russians lost 956 soldiers and had 1,829 wounded by the end of the storming operation, which they spent within hours (as per another assessment, 1,000 lost and 5,000 injured). In total, the Russians paid a high price: 15,000 men out of 40,000 during the siege.

== Aftermath ==
Colonel of the Second Bug Regiment Pyotr Mikhailovich Skarzhinsky "distinguished himself during the capture of Ochakov." He was one of the first to climb the ramparts of the fortress. He was awarded Russia's most prestigious military decoration the Order of St. George.

The Russian victory was celebrated in a famous ode by Gavrila Derzhavin, and in a Te Deum by Giuseppe Sarti.

== See also ==
- Naval actions at the Siege of Ochakov (1788)
