= Battle of Lemnos =

Battle of Lemnos may refer to:

- Battle of Lemnos (73 BC), between the navies of Rome and the Kingdom of Pontus
- Battle of Lemnos (1024), between the Byzantines and Rus' raiders
- Siege of Lemnos (1770), between the Russian and Ottoman fleets
- Battle of Athos (1807), between the Russian and Ottoman fleets
- Battle of Lemnos (1912), capture of the island by the Greeks
- Battle of Lemnos (1913), between the Greek and Ottoman fleets
