= Siege of Lesbos (1771) =

Battle of Lesbos (1771)
- Part of the Russo-Turkish War (1768–1774)
Date	11–16 November 1771
Location	Lesbos, Ottoman Empire
Result	Ottoman victory

Belligerents
Ottoman Empire	Russian Empire

Commanders and leaders
(Ottoman Empire) Cezayirli Gazi Hasan Pasha	Alexei Grigoryevich Orlov

The siege of Lesbos in 1771 took place during the Russo-Turkish War (1768–1774). The Ottoman Navy under the command of Cezayirli Gazi Hasan Pasha liberated Lesbos from the siege by the Russian Navy under the command of Aleksey Orlov between 11 and 16 November 1771.

== Background ==
After the burning of the Ottoman Navy in the Battle of Chesma, the commander of the Russian Navy, Aleksey Orlov, who was left free in the Aegean Sea, turned to the idea of establishing a Princedom of the Islands under the Tsardom of Russia within the framework of the protection demands he began to receive from the islands with a dense Greek population. Following the defeat he suffered in the siege of Lemnos in October 1770, Admiral Orlov set out for St. Petersburg in November to receive instructions from the Tsarina Catherine the Great on this matter, and left the command of the Russian fleet to Grigory Spiridov. On January 12, 1771, Admiral Spiridov promised 14 Aegean islands autonomy under Russian protection (by 1774 the number of islands wishing to become Russian protectorates would increase to 27). Lesbos and Kos, which did not submit this request and were described by the Russians as hostile islands, were the scene of attacks by the Russian navy.

== Siege ==
The Russian fleet under the command of Admiral Orlov, returning from St. Petersburg, arrived in front of Lesbos on November 11, 1771, and dropped anchor. They then demanded the surrender of the main castle and the island from the Turkish garrison, but this demand was rejected by the local Ottoman commander, Osman Pasha. Thereupon, after subjecting the castle to cannon fire for three days, the Russian fleet landed troops on the island on November 13 and began a major plundering campaign.

Kapudan Pasha Cezayirli Gazi Hasan Pasha, on the other hand, had received advance notice that the island was being targeted and requested military reinforcements. Hasan Pasha, who received the necessary reinforcements, raided the island on November 16, 1771. While the Russian forces, who did not expect this attack, quickly retreated to their ships, the Russian fleet retreated in disorder, leaving 25 soldiers as prisoners in a hairpin called "Santorino". Hasan Pasha, who had the hairpin burned, sent 25 captured Russian soldiers to Istanbul.
