= Cezayirli Gazi Hasan Pasha =

Grand Vizier of the Ottoman Empire in 1790

Cezayirli Hasan Pasha
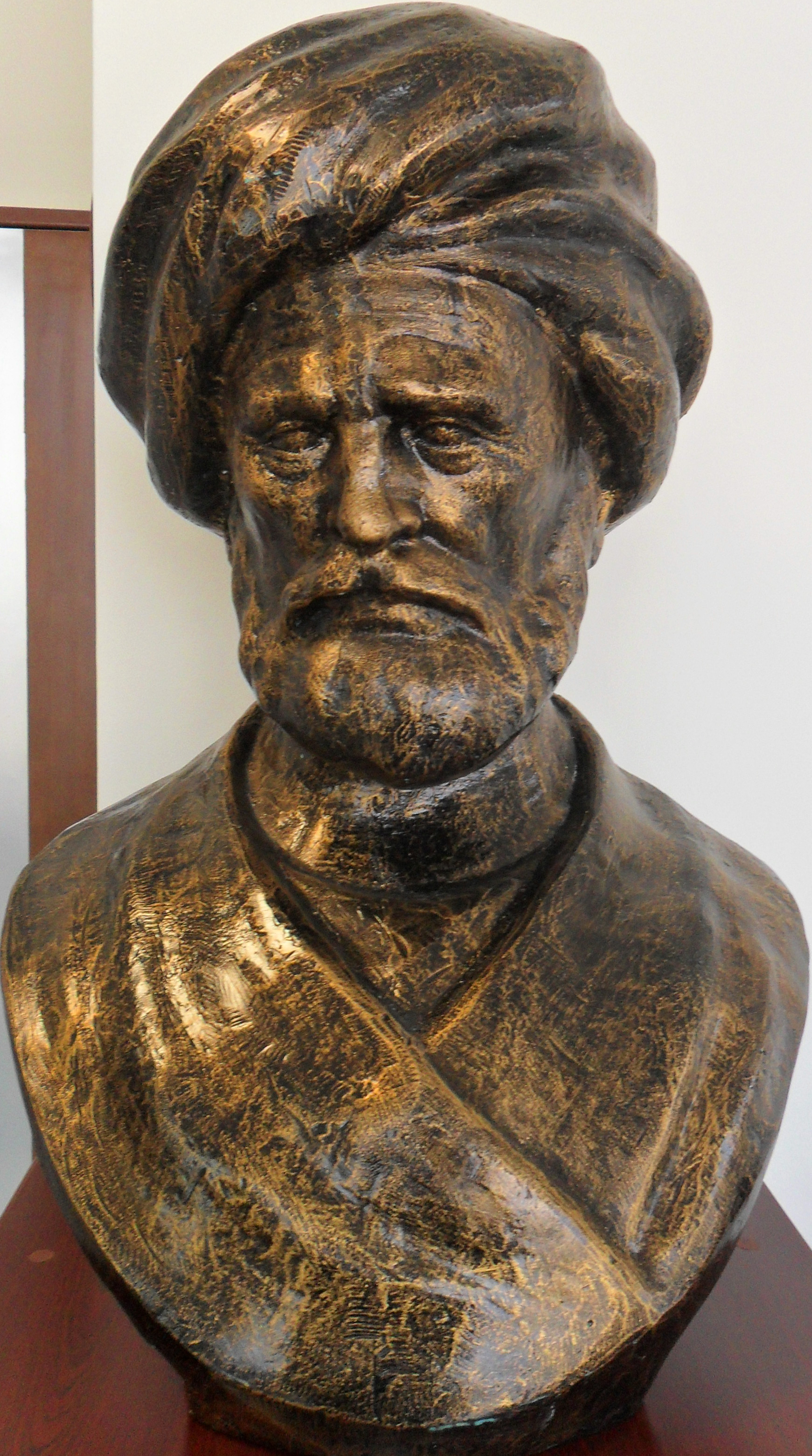
- Cezayirli Gazi Hasan Pasha bust at Mersin Naval Museum
- Born: 1713
- Died: 1790 (aged 76–77)
- Military career
- Allegiance: Ottoman Empire
- Service years: 1737–1790
- Rank: Kapudan Pasha
- Nickname: Ejder-i Bahrî (Monster of the Seas)
- Conflicts: Russo-Turkish War (1735–1739); Capture of Belgrade (1739); Russo-Turkish War (1768–1774); Orlov revolt; Battle of Nauplia (1770); Siege of Lemnos (1770); Battle of Chesma; Siege of Lesbos (1771); Russo-Turkish War (1787–1792); Battle of Fidonisi; Siege of Ochakov (1788); Action of 17 June 1788

Cezayirli Gazi Hasan Pasha (1713 – 19 March 1790) or Algerian Hasan Pasha, nicknamed Ejder-i Bahrî (Monster of the Seas), was an Ottoman Grand Admiral (1770–90), Grand Vizier (1790), and general in the late 18th century.

== Early life ==
He is known to have been brought up as a Georgian slave in western Anatolia by a Turkish merchant of Tekirdağ, who raised him in that city considering him on a par with his own sons.

== Career ==
He rose through the ranks of the Ottoman military hierarchy and was for a time with the Barbary Coast pirates based in Algiers (whence his name Cezayirli, meaning "Algerian" in Turkish). He was a fleet commander during the Battle of Chesme aboard the Real Mustafa and was able to extract the forces under his command from the general disaster for the Ottoman Navy that occurred there. He arrived at the Ottoman capital Istanbul with the bad news, but was highly praised for his own accomplishment and promoted, first to chief of staff and later to grand vizier. He dislodged the Russian fleet which had established a base on the Aegean island of Lemnos in October 1770, and forced them out of Lesbos in November 1771.

Anecdotal evidence indicates that, immediately after the defeat at Chesme, he and his men were lodged by a local priest in Ayvalık who did not know who they were. Hasan Pasha did not forget the kindness shown at that hour of crisis and later accorded virtual autonomy to the Greek-dominated town of Ayvalık, paving the way for it to become an important cultural center for that community in the Ottoman Empire in the 19th century.

Following the failure of the Orlov revolt, as part of Russo-Turkish War of 1768–1774, Hasan Pasha prevented a proposed general massacre of Greeks. He initially publicly opposed the proposed massacre on moral grounds, but after exhausting his arguments without persuading the other members of the Ottoman council, he finally asked who would pay the haraç if all the Greeks were killed, ultimately persuading the other members. He also showed clemency towards Greek islanders who had supported the Russians, while his Greek interpreter Nicholas Mavrogenes persuaded him to pardon the inhabitants of Psara, whose flotilla had raided the coast-towns during the war. Greek historian Konstantinos Sathas described Hasan Pasha as a "philhellene", declaring that Greece owed him "many great debts of gratitude" for his actions.

The defeat also prompted Hasan Pasha to establish the Naval Engineering Golden Horn Shipyard (later Turkish Naval Academy) in 1773.

Hasan Pasha blockaded Acre in the summer of 1775 in order to check the power of the autonomous Arab ruler of Palestine, Zahir al-Umar. Hasan Pasha ordered Zahir to pay 50,000 piasters to relieve the siege. Zahir ultimately refused and consequently, Hasan Pasha's ships bombarded Acre, but the Ottoman Empire troops manning Acre's cannons refused Zahir's orders to fire back at the ships and intentionally directed their fire away from Hasan Pasha's naval forces. Their loyalty to the Ottoman sultan precluded them from firing on his military. Zahir fled, but was killed by Hasan Pasha's troops before he could escape.

In 1786, Hasan Pasha was ordered by the sultan Abdul Hamid I to take troops to Egypt and drive out the Mamluk emirs led by Ibrahim Bey (Mamluk) and Murad Bey, who had become de facto rulers of the province. He arrived in Egypt in early August 1786 and was successful in this campaign (although the Mamluk emirs would regain power after his death) and remained the de facto Ottoman governor of Egypt for around a year. His long-time kethüda (assistant/deputy) Ismail Pasha the Tripolitanian remained in Egypt and was soon appointed the Ottoman governor of Egypt himself (1788–89, 1789–91) while his allied Mamluk emir Ismail Bey became the Shaykh al-Balad and de facto ruler.

In the Russo-Turkish War of 1787-1792, Hasan Pasha (then 74) commanded the Turkish troops in the beginning campaigns, taking part in the action of 17 June 1788, the Battle of Fidonisi, and the Siege of Ochakov.

== Death ==
He died on 19 March 1790, from illness or perhaps poisoned. His statue today graces the resort town of Çeşme, along with the lion that he domesticated while in Africa and took along with him everywhere.

== See also ==
- Cezayirli Hasan Paşa Monument

== Sources ==
- Nuttall Encyclopedia:
- World Statesman: Turkey – Grand Viziers
- J.H. Mordtmann, in E.J. Brill's first encyclopaedia of Islam, 1913–36, Volume 2, p. 1039

Political offices
Preceded by Yeğen Seyyid Mehmed Pasha as Governor	Ottoman Governor of Egypt (acting); 1786–1787	Succeeded by Keki Abdi Pasha as Governor
Preceded by Cenaze Hasan Pasha	Grand Vizier of the Ottoman Empire; 2 January 1790 – 30 March 1790	Succeeded by Çelebizade Şerif Hasan Pasha
