= Battle of Nauplia (1770) =

1770 naval battle during the Russo-Turkish War

- Part of the Russo-Turkish War (1768–1774)
Date	27–31 May 1770
Location	near the Argolic Gulf, Ottoman Empire
Result	Inconclusive

Belligerents
Ottoman Empire	Russian Empire

Commanders and leaders
Cezayirli Gazi Hasan Pasha	John Elphinstone

Strength
10 battleships	3 battleships 2 frigates 4 armed merchantmen

Casualties and losses
Low	Heavy

Fought during the Russo-Turkish War, 1768–1774, this battle took place between 27 and 31 May 1770 at the entrance to the Argolic Gulf in the Ottoman Empire, when a Russian fleet under John Elphinstone engaged a larger Ottoman fleet. Although no ships were lost on either side, Russian casualties were heavy and they had to withdraw. Some sources describe the battle as an Ottoman victory, while others regard it as a Russian success.

== History ==
Elphinston had arrived at Cape Matapan, southern Greece, on 20 May 1770 from Portsmouth and landed his troops on 22 May at Rupino. Hearing that the Ottoman fleet was divided in two, he decided to attack. After battling bad weather, he sighted the Ottoman ships on 27 May at the entrance to the gulf and despite the superior numbers of the Ottomans (about 10 battleships and some smaller vessels vs 3 battleships, 2 frigates and 4 armed merchantmen) he sailed up before a light SSE breeze to attack. Soon after 5pm Ne tron menya attacked the Ottoman flagship, and then Saratov attacked the Ottoman Vice- and Rear Admiral's ships. Nadezhda was also in action. Elphinston, in Svyatoslav, had to chase and fire on the armed merchantmen to get them to fight, but when he did attack the Ottoman fleet retreated, using their galleys to tow their battleships north. The Russians used their boats to do the same.

On 28 May, soon after 12pm the Ottoman fleet anchored in line under the guns of the Nauplia batteries. At about 3pm Elphinston attacked, standing up and down the Ottoman line, but with little effect. Russian casualties were low at first.

On 30 May, the Ottomans began to move, and some Russian captains insisted that they were not bound to attack such a superior fleet. Elphinston had to give in, and during the evening of 31 May as the Ottomans steadily approached, being towed again by their galleys, the wind rose and the Russians got away with heavy casualties.

== Ships involved ==
=== Russia (Elphinston) ===
Svyatoslav 80 (flag)
Ne tron menya 66
Saratov 66
Afrika 32
Nadezhda 32
Graf Tchernyshev 22 (hired British merchantman)
Graf Panin 18 (hired British merchantman)
Graf Orlov 18 (hired British merchantman)
Sv. Pavel 8

=== Ottoman Empire ===
(details uncertain)
? 84 (flag)
4 other 84-gun battleships
2 64-gun battleships
4 54-gun battleships
2 50-gun battleships
a few smaller ships, including galleys
