= Battle of Berezan (1788) =

- Part of the Russo-Turkish War (1787–1792)
Date	18 November [O.S. 7 November] 1788
Location	Berezan Island, Black Sea
Result	Cossack–Russian victory
Territorial changes	Capture of Berezan Island by Russians and Cossacks

Belligerents
Black Sea Cossack Host; Russian Empire	Ottoman Empire

Commanders and leaders
Antin Holovaty; Leontiy Hulyk; Naval assistance: (Russian Empire) José de Ribas (Russian Empire) Grigory Potemkin (Russian Empire) Alexander Suvorov	Keleci Osman Pasha (surrendered)

Strength
836 Cossacks	400

Casualties and losses
See Casualties	See Casualties

The Battle of Berezan or Assault on Berezan (Ukrainian and Russian: Штурм острова Березань) was a battle over the island of Berezan (now Mykolaiv oblast, Ukraine) that took place during the Russo-Turkish war between the Black Sea Cossack Host and the Ottoman garrison on the island. The Black Sea Cossacks, supported by the Russian fleet, attacked the Ottoman garrison on the island and defeated it.

== Background ==
As of January 1788, there were no more than 100 garrison members in the Berezan fortress, but in February the additional 200 soldiers were sent on the island.

In July 1788, Grigory Potemkin decided to capture and destroy Ottoman fortress on the island. The execution of this task was entrusted to Alexander Suvorov, who was given a significant force of 600 infantrymen on rowing ships and Cossack boats. Intensive preparations for this operation, which was to be supported by ships of the fleet and artillery, were carried out on July 12–14. When everything was ready for the assault, the commander-in-chief canceled his decision due to the Russian preparations for the upcoming siege of Ochakov and appearance of the significant number of Ottoman fleet near the island.

After the events near Ochakov, the island was temporarily forgotten, and the Cossacks were instructed to move to the right bank of the Berezan River, set up pickets along the seashore, and prevent the landings by Danube Cossacks. In this regard, in July and early August 1788, the Danubian kish in Tuzly ceased to exist, and Berezan temporarily became the main base of the naval flotilla of the "Turkish" Cossacks.

In the autumn of 1788, Hasan Pasha, who was commander of the Ottoman flotilla stationed near Ochakov, significantly strengthened the fortress on Berezan Island by building two artillery batteries and a line of trenches in the northern part of the island. Following his retreat, the Cossacks received an order from Potemkin to capture the fortress.

== Battle ==
On the morning of November 7 (November 18, new style), the Cossacks led by Antin Holovaty boarded their boats and, accompanied by a flotilla of gunboats under José De Ribas, began approaching the island. Despite the artillery fire from the northeastern battery, the Cossacks nevertheless approached the island and landed on the northern shore within a shot's distance. Having fired a volley of cannons and rifles, and then thrown themselves into the water and sharply moved towards the impregnable shore, the Cossacks crushed the main Ottoman units and captured the coastal battery. Turning the captured cannons against the fortress and installing their own, taken from the boats, the Black Sea troops began to smash the Berezan fortress. At the same time, Russian boats began to shell Berezan. The Turks were forced to surrender the fortress. The assault on the fortress took a few hours.

== Aftermath and casualties ==
Per Potemkin's report, the Ottoman garrison casualties were 80 killed and 320 captured. Per the same report from Potemkin, the Cossacks lost 29 people in total – 24 regular Cossacks, 4 kurin atamans and one regimental starshyna. A few days later following the assault, the Black Sea Cossacks attacked the Ottoman convoy near Akkerman, captured several Ottoman ships and transferred them to the Russians. On 17 of November, hovewer, Potyomkin in his report to Catherine the Great stated that the island serves no strategic importance, after that he ordered the Cossacks that were still on the island to demolish the fortress. Capture of the island made easier for the Russians to launch a general assault on Ochakov on 6 of December. The Cossacks had finally left the island in the spring of 1789. In commemoration about the assault, in 1792 the Cossacks that were resettled to Kuban founded a stanitsa named Berezanskaya.
