= Naval actions at the Siege of Ochakov (1788) =

Russo-Turkish naval battles

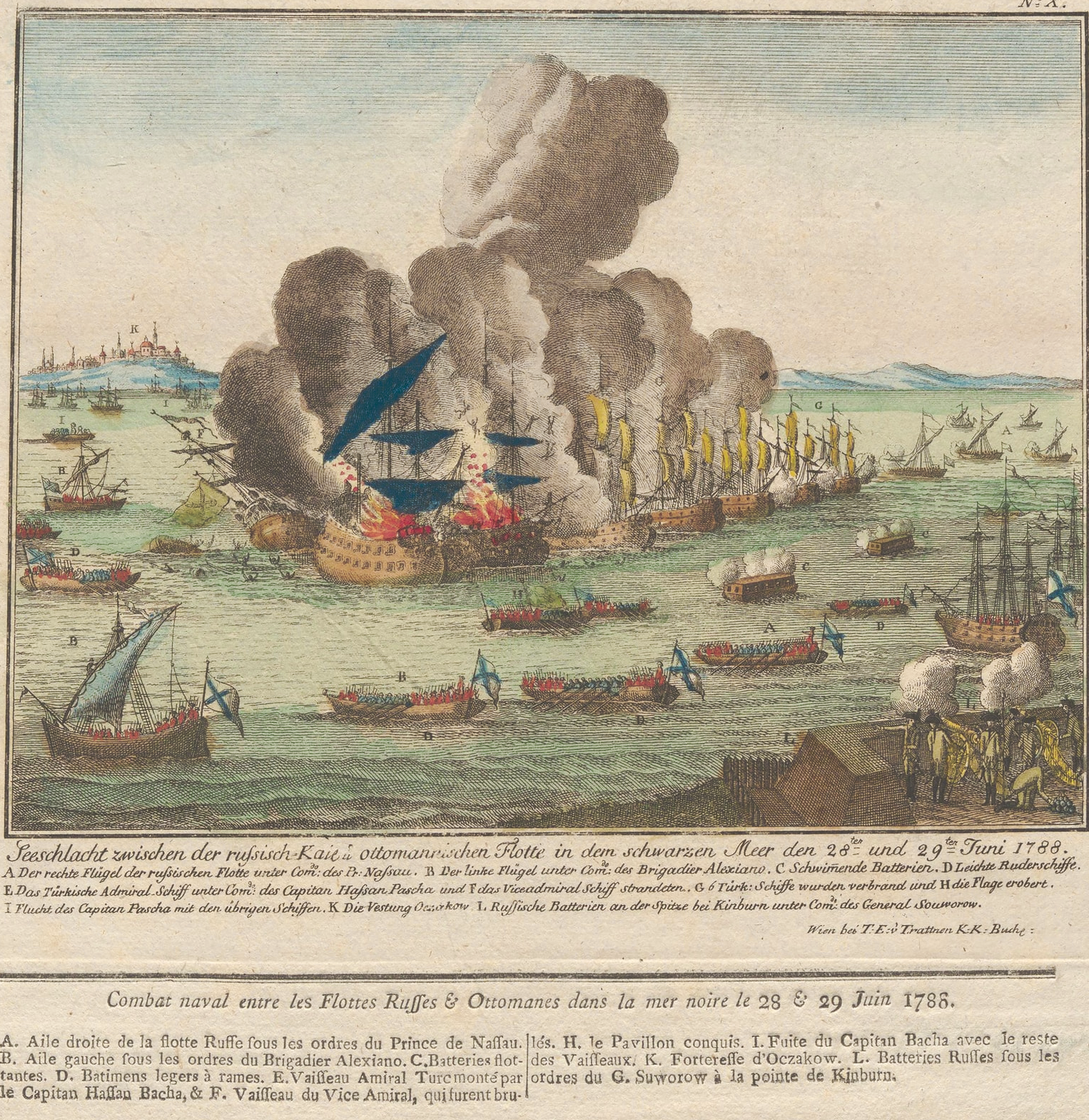
Naval battle of Ochakov

This was a series of mainly small-ship actions which occurred along the coast of what is now Ukraine during the Russo-Turkish War (1787–1792) as Russian and Turkish ships and boats supported their land armies in the struggle for control of Ochakov, a strategic position. The main actions at sea happened on 17, 18, 28 and 29 June and 9 July 1788. On 9 July also, the larger Turkish ships left and on 14 July they fought the Russian Sevastopol Squadron about 100 miles to the south.

== The parties ==
The Russians had a small sailing ship fleet, commanded by Alexiano, but finally taken command of by John Paul Jones on 6 June, and a gunboat flotilla (the makeup of which changed over the course of the fighting), commanded by Prince Charles of Nassau-Siegen. Both of these men had been made Russian Rear-Admirals, and were themselves commanded by Prince Potemkin.

The Turks had a large mixed fleet, commanded by Kapudan Pasha (admiral in chief) Hassan el Ghazi, part of which came in close to support the fighting, and part of which stayed out. It is hard to determine the makeup of this force accurately. Most of its ships were probably armed merchantmen, carrying around 40 guns, a few were probably larger. Different accounts give different numbers, but according to an 8 April list from Istanbul, the fleet consisted of 12 battleships, 13 frigates, 2 bombs, 2 galleys, 10 gunboats and 6 fireships. There were some xebecs (oared vessels of 30 or more guns) as well, but perhaps these were counted as frigates.

== Chronology ==
On 19 March 1788, the Russian sailing fleet moved from its position near Cherson to Cape Stanislav.

On 21 April, Nassau-Siegen reached Cherson with his flotilla and on 24 April moved into the Liman.

On 27 May, the Russian Sevastopol Squadron under Count Voinovitch attempted to leave port but was forced back almost immediately by adverse conditions. If it had sailed, it might have met the Turkish fleet earlier than it did.

On 30 May Jones arrived, but left to confer with Suvorov about the building of a new battery at Kinburn (on the south coast, facing Ochakov) before returning on 6 June.

Meanwhile, on 31 May the Turkish fleet had arrived. The Russian flotilla waited too long before retreating, and one of its vessels, the double-sloop No. 2, was overtaken by small craft and its commander, Osten-Sacken, blew himself up.

After a minor action on 17 June, on 18 June at about 7.30 am 5 Turkish galleys and 36 small craft attacked the inshore end of the Russian line, which was perpendicular to the coast. At first the Russians had only 6 galleys, 4 barges and 4 double-sloops to oppose them. At about 10 a.m. el Ghazi arrived with 12 more vessels, but Nassau-Siegen and Jones had advanced the offshore ends to bring their whole forces into action and at 10.30 the Turks withdrew with the loss of 2 or 3 vessels burnt and blown up. At about 11 a.m. firing stopped and by 12 p.m. the Russian flotilla had rejoined the sailing ships.

On 27 June at 12 p.m., the Turkish fleet steered for the left (windward) end of the Russian line but at 2 p.m. their flagship ran aground and the other ships anchored in disarray. Adverse winds prevented the Russians from attacking until about 2 a.m. on 28 June when it shifted to the NNE, but the Turkish ship had been refloated and the Turks tried to form a line. At about 4 a.m. all the Russians advanced and at 5.15 a.m. they were in action. The Turkish second flagship ran aground and Nassau-Siegen sent in the left wing of his flotilla to attack her. This left his right wing weak, and Malyi Aleksandr was sunk by Turkish bombs. However, the Turkish battleship was burnt, this fate also falling to her flagship later. At 9.30 p.m., the Turks withdrew under the Ochakov guns; el Ghazi decided to withdraw his sailing ships completely, but the new battery at Kinburn forced him so far to the north that 9 of his ships ran aground, and the next morning the Russian flotilla surrounded these and several small craft and destroyed them all except for one 54-gun battleship, which they refloated.

The Turks had lost 2 battleships and 885 captured on 28 June, and perhaps 8 battleships, 2 frigates, 2 xebecs, 1 bomb, 1 galley and 1 transport and 788 captured on 29 June. Russian casualties were 18 killed and 67 wounded in the flotilla, and probably slight losses in the sailing ships.

The Turkish fleet appeared near Pirezin Adası, west of Ochakov, on 1 July, to try to rescue the small craft, but decided not to pass the batteries again and on 9 July it put to sea to meet the Russian Sevastopol' fleet, which it fought in the Battle of Fidonisi to the south on 14 July.

On 9 July also the Russian army began to assault Ochakov and the Russian flotilla attacked the Turkish vessels there. Forces involved in this were as follows: Russian: 7 galleys, 7 double-sloops, 7 floating batteries, 7 "decked boats" and 22 gunboats. Turkish: 2 20-gun xebecs/frigates, 5 galleys, 1 kırlangıç (very similar to a galley), 1 16-gun brigantine, 1 bomb and 2 gunboats.

At 3.15 a.m. firing started. The 2 Turkish gunboats and 1 galley were captured by the Russians and the rest were burnt. Firing ceased at 9.30. Russian casualties were 24 killed and 80 wounded.

== Ships involved ==
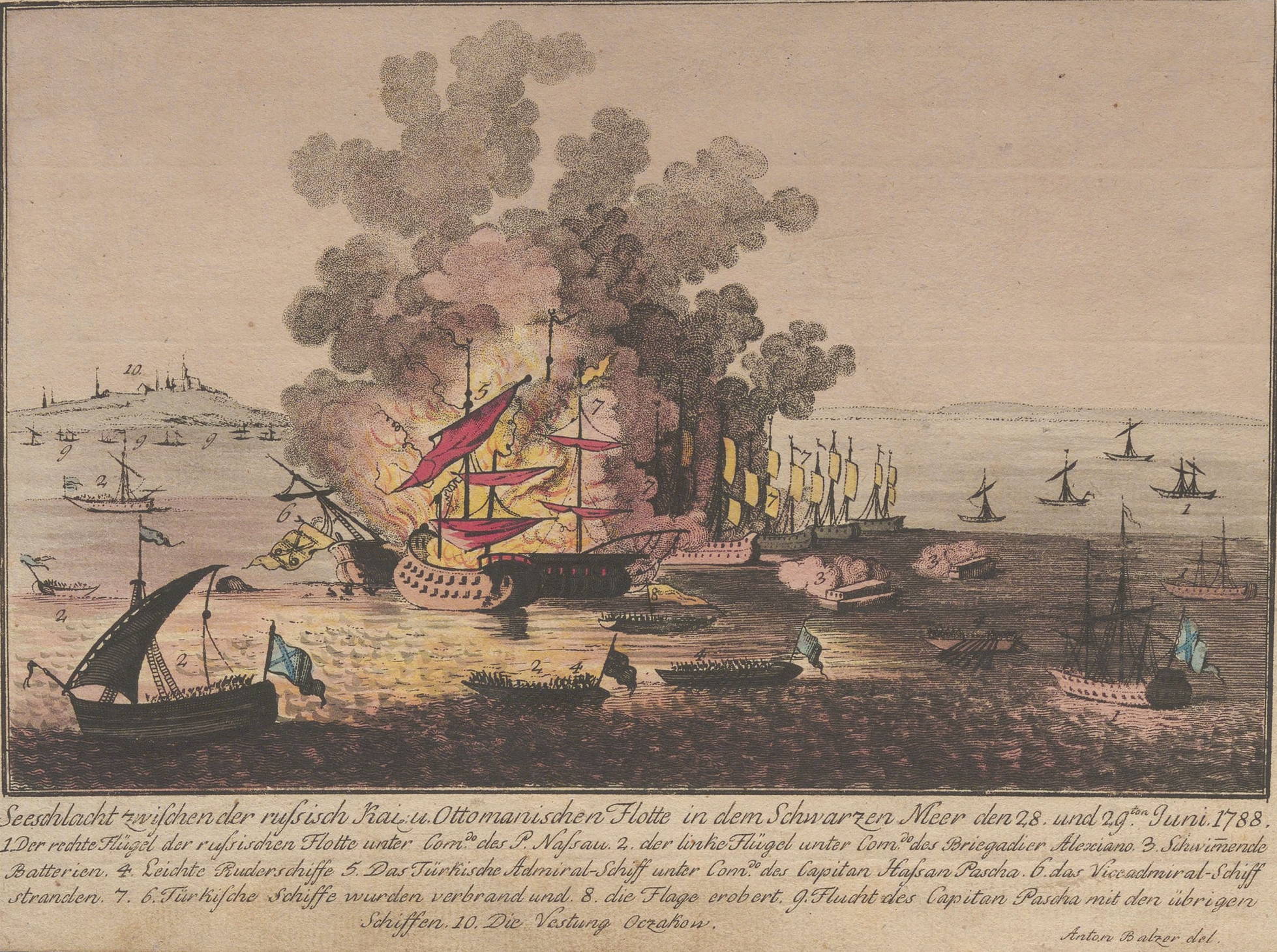
The naval battle of Ochakov on 28–29 June 1788 by Antonín Karel Balzer

=== Russia ===
Sailing ship fleet (Jones): (Only the first 3 were built as warships)
Vladimir 48 (reduced from 66 due to shallow water)
Aleksandr Nevskii 40 (reduced from 50 due to shallow water)
Skoryi 40
Cherson 32
Sv. Nikolai 26
Malyi Aleksandr 34 - Sunk 28 June
Boristen 24
Taganrog 34
Ptchela 24
Bogomater Turlenu
Sv. Anna
Grigorii Potemkin
Melent
Bityug (bomb)
Flotilla (Nassau-Siegen):
?

=== Turkey (Hassan el Ghazi) ===
12 battleships, mostly small
13 frigates or xebecs
2 bombs
2 galleys
10 gunboats
6 fireships

== Sources ==
- Anderson, R. C., Naval wars in the Levant 1559-1853, 1952. ISBN 1-57898-538-2
