= Siege of Lemnos (1657) =

- Part of the Cretan War (Fifth Ottoman–Venetian War)
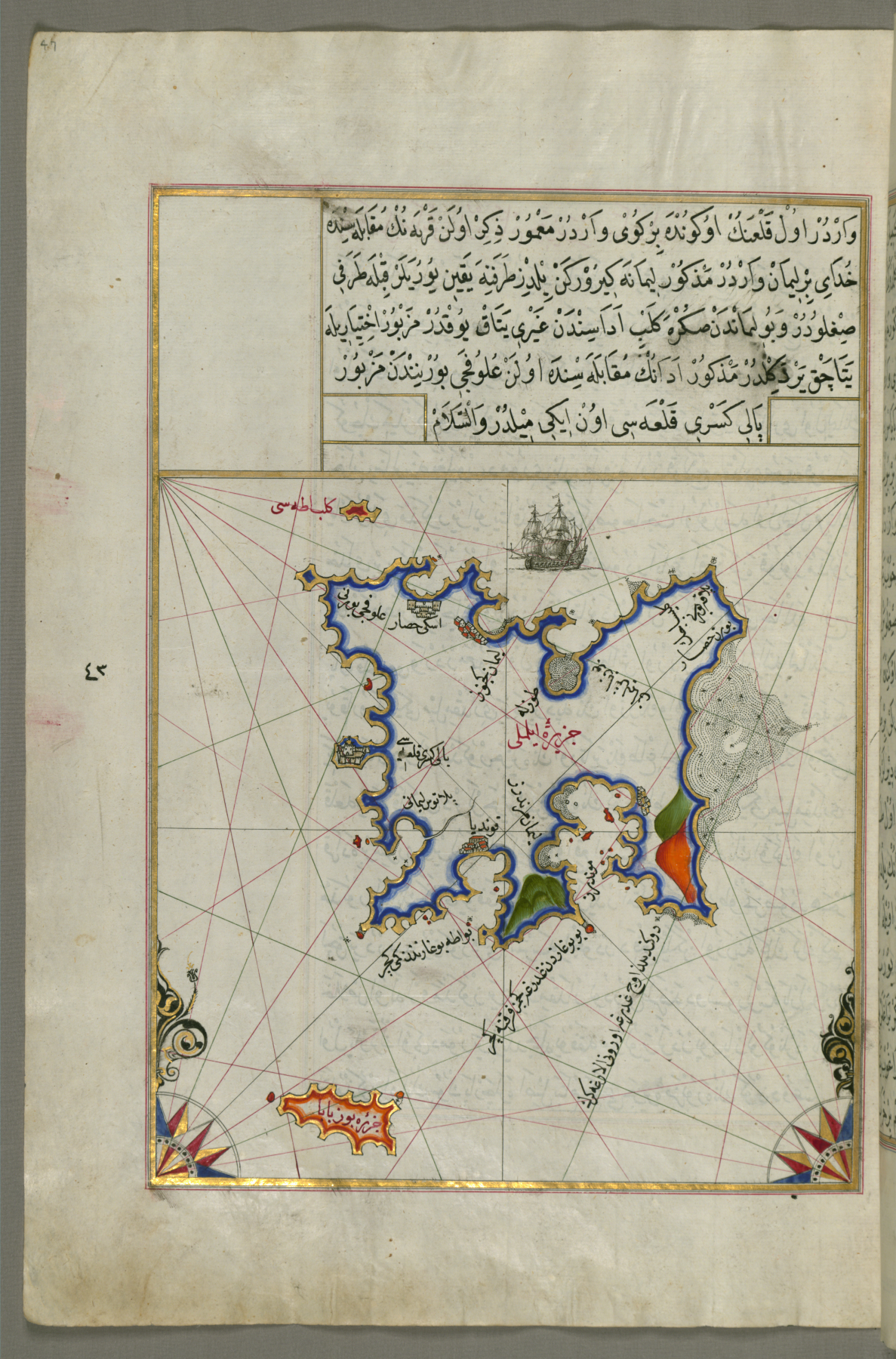
- Map of Lemnos, Ottoman drawing
Date	September – 12 November 1657
Location	Lemnos
Result	Ottoman victory

Belligerents
Ottoman Empire	Republic of Venice

Commanders and leaders
(Ottoman Empire) Topal Mehmed Pasha	(Republic of Venice) Lorenzo Renier

Strength
(Ottoman Empire) 4,000 or 10,000 men	(Republic of Venice) Unknown

Casualties and losses
(Ottoman Empire) 500+	(Republic of Venice) 100–200 killed 500 captured

The siege of Lemnos happened during the Cretan War when the Ottomans launched a campaign to reconquer the island of Lemnos from the Venetians. The Ottomans captured the island in the end.

== Background ==
The Ottomans won the fourth battle of Dardanelles and soon the Venetians found themselves on the defensive. The costly battles in Dardanelles and the struggle to hold on to Crete took a toll on the Venetians. They had already occupied the islands of Lemnos and Tindos. Those two islands were far away from the supply line. The peace party in the senate argued to abandon the two islands; however, the war party prevailed in the end. The Ottomans wanted a peace treaty but still demanded the surrender of Crete. The Ottomans under Köprülü Mehmed Pasha took an aggressive stance. On August 31, the Ottomans landed at Tindos, easily captured after the Venetians abandoned it.

== Siege ==
The Ottomans arrived and landed 4,000 or 10,000 men on Lemnos led by Topal Mehmed Pasha. Since the castle was built on a rock, it was impossible to have mine works while the garrison received a reinforcement of 17 ships. The Ottomans launched a general assault on the city but were repulsed with a loss of 500 men, leaving their ladders to the garrison. Afterwards, they made several assaults but were all beaten off with considerable losses. The Ottomans almost abandoned their enterprise, but the apprehension awaiting from the Divan made them stay and fight the Venetians. Eventually, after 63 days of siege and without hope of any relief force, the Venetians surrendered on November 12. It was decided that the garrison would leave unharmed; however, the Ottomans massacred 100 or 200 of them and took 500 prisoners, some of them were galley slaves liberated by Venetians during the previous battles with the Ottomans. The reconquest of Tindos and Lemnos caused great joy to the Divan the inhabitants of Istanbul.

== Sources ==
- Setton, Kenneth Meyer (1991). Venice, Austria, and the Turks in the Seventeenth Century. Philadelphia: The American Philosophical Society. ISBN 0-87169-192-2.
- Sir Paul Rycaut (1680), The History of the Turkish Empire: From the Year 1623 to the Year 1677; Containing the Reigns of the Three Last Emperours.
- Joseph von Hammer (1840), Histoire de l'Empire ottoman, Vol 11.
