= John Elphinstone =

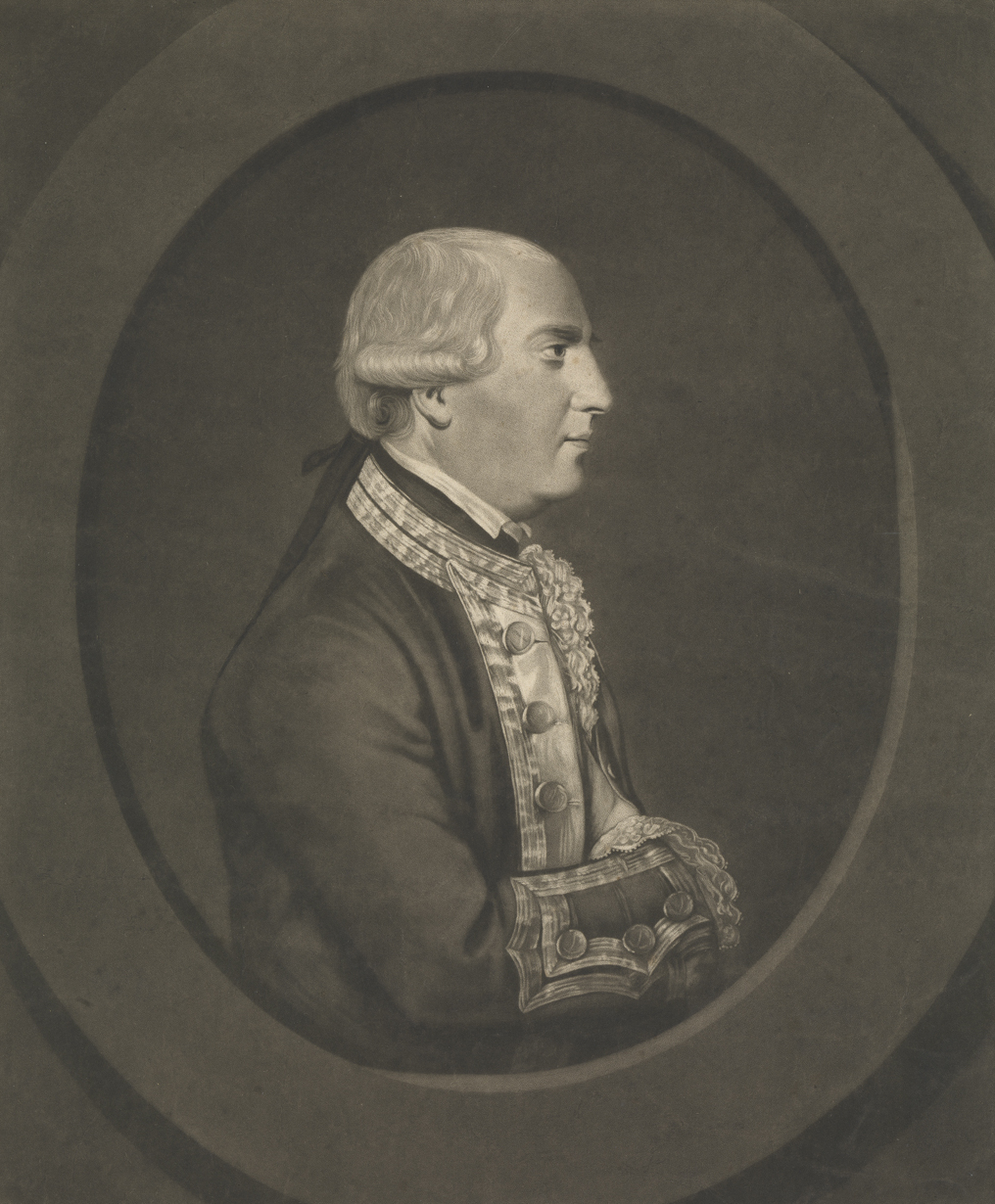
Portrait of Elphinstone

John Elphinstone (1722 – 28 February 1785) was a British naval officer who served in the Royal Navy before joining the Imperial Russian Navy in 1770 with approval from the Admiralty. Together with fellow Britons Samuel Greig and Charles Knowles, Elphinstone was part of a group of Russian naval officers under Alexei Grigoryevich Orlov which defeated the Ottoman Navy at the Battle of Chesma, off Chios.

== Early life ==
He was born at Lopness, near Sanday in the Orkney Islands, the son of John Elphinstone and his wife Anne Williams and joined the Royal Navy.

He was promoted commander of the fireship HMS Salamander in 1757, serving under Commodore Hon. Richard Howe in his 1758 campaign against the French Channel ports. During one attack he was captured by the French.

After his release in 1759 he was made captain of the 20-gun HMS Eurus and took part in the capture of Quebec. In 1761 he was in command of HMS Richmond when she captured and destroyed the 32-gun French ship Félicité at Scheveningen. Later that year Elphinstone captured two other French privateers. In 1762 Richmond sailed out to the West Indies and Elphinstone was put in charge of transport services during the siege of Havana. He afterwards brought back the 70-gun prize ship Infanta.

At the end of 1763 he commissioned the guard ship HMS Firm at Plymouth, commanding her for three years.

== Russian service ==
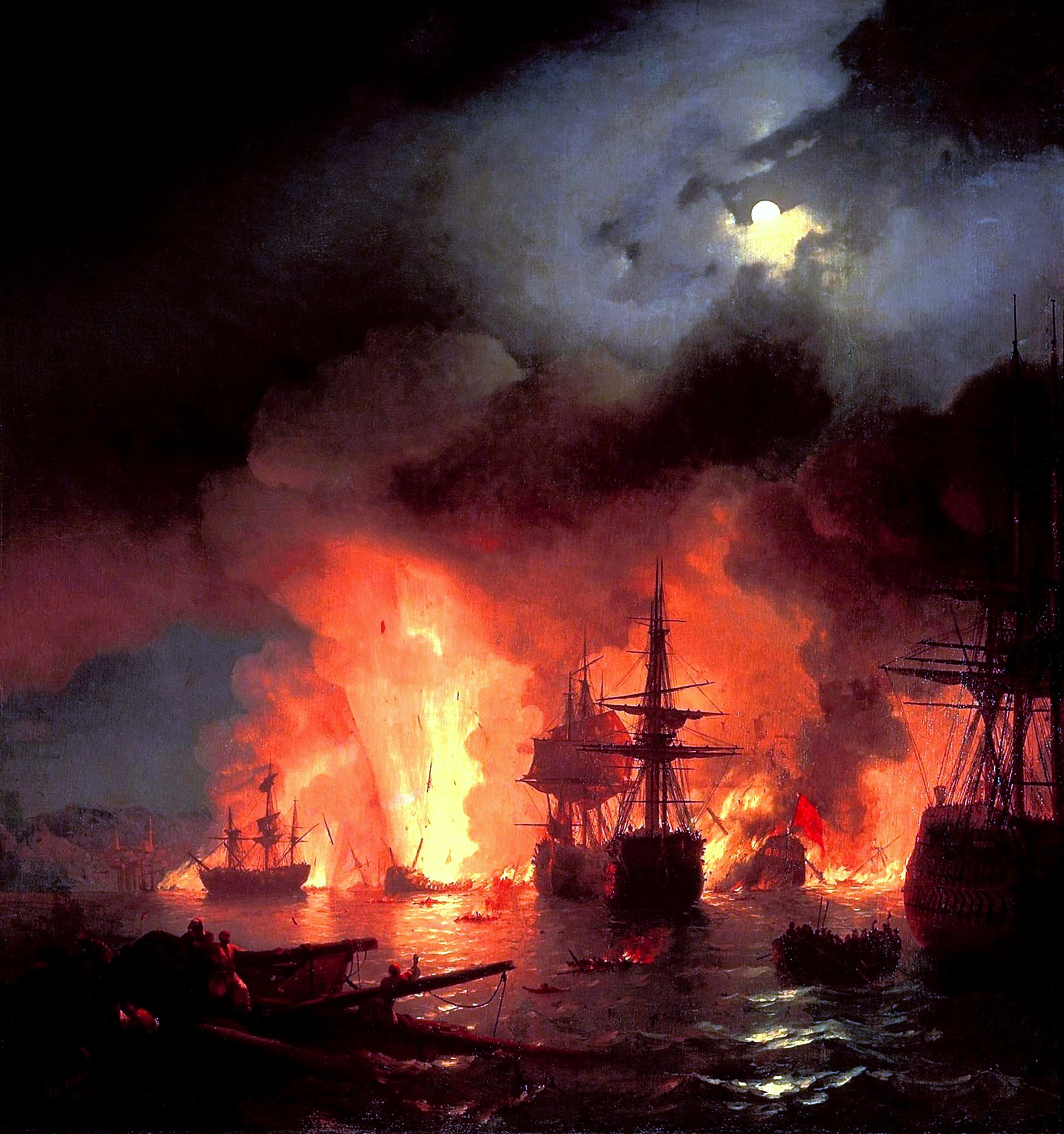
The Battle of Chesma Bay in 1770

Catherine II of Russia drew on the experience of British naval personnel through the networking in London of the British Ambassador in St. Petersburg from 1769 to 1771, Lieutenant-General Charles Cathcart, 9th Lord Cathcart. He was married to Jane Hamilton, but Jane's death in Saint Petersburg during an outbreak of the plague, prompted his return to Britain.

Elphinstone was one of a small number of British officers who joined the Catherine's Russian service in the summer of 1769, and was given the rank of rear-admiral. In 1770 he led a squadron from the Baltic to the Mediterranean to take part in the war against the Turks and participated in the defeat of a Turkish fleet in Battle of Chesma Bay. Soon thereafter, he participated in the failed siege of Lemnos. Elphinstone, however, was on such bad terms with his Russian superiors (particularly Count Aleksei Orlov), that he left Russian service in July 1771.

== Later life ==
John Elphinstone later held several further commands in the British Royal Navy, including that of the 74-gun HMS Magnificent during Admiral Sir George Rodney's West Indian Campaign of 1779–80.

He died in 1785 in Broad Street, Carnaby Market, London. He had married Amelia Warburton, daughter of John Warburton, Somerset Herald, in 1750 and had seven sons and four daughters. They included:

- John, a post captain (1756 - 1801)
- Samuel William, who died as a captain in the Russian service (1758 - 1789)
- Thomas, who reached the same rank in the navy before his death (1765 - 1821)
- Robert Phillip Rodolph, who died as a post captain (1769 - 1822)
- Major-General Sir Howard Elphinstone (1773 - 1846)
- Molineux Roley (1777 - 1814)
- Anna-Charlotta-Maria (1763 - 1809), who married Captain Sir Francis John Hartwell
- Jane Alice Amelia (1767 - 1856) married John Dymoke in 1799
- Catherine Sarah (1775 -1851) married Thomas Roe in 1798

== Sources ==
- "Эльфинстон, Джон (моряк)" . Brockhaus and Efron Encyclopedic Dictionary (in Russian). 1906.
- John Elphinston Papers Relating to the Russo-Turkish War, 1769-1850 (bulk 1769-1771): Finding Aid at Princeton University
- "Scottish Influences in Russian History"
- Bartlett, Roger and Hughes, Lindsey, Dr. (eds.). Russian Society and Culture and the Long Eighteenth Century: Esays in Honour of Anthony G. Cross. Paperback, Lit Verlag, 2005. ISBN 978-3-8258-7771-2; ISBN 3-8258-7771-X.
- Anthony G. Cross. By the Banks of the Neva: Chapters from the Lives and Careers of the British in Eighteenth-Century Russia. Cambridge: Cambridge University Press, 1997. (Anthony Cross was Professor of Slavonic Studies at the University of Cambridge from 1985 to 2004. Previously, he was Reader in Russian at the University of East Anglia and Roberts Professor of Russian at the University of Leeds. He was elected to the British Academy in 1989 and to the Russian Academy of the Humanities in 1996.)
- Schop Soler, Ana María. Un siglo de relaciones diplomáticas y comerciales entre España y Rusia : 1733-1833 Madrid: Ministerio de Asuntos Exteriores, Dirección General de Relaciones Culturales, D.L. (1984), 520 pages; 24 cm. In Spanish.
- Schop Soler, Ana María. Las relaciones entre España y Rusia en la época de Fernando VII (1808-1833), Barcelona, Universidad de Barcelona, (1975). In Spanish.
- Schop Soler, Ana María. Las relaciones entre España y Rusia en la época de Carlos IV Ana María, Schop Soler; prólogo de Carlos Seco Serrano. Editor: Barcelona: Cátedra de Historia General de España, 1971. xvii +196 pages; 21 cm. In Spanish. German Edition: Die Spanische-Russischen Beziehungen im 18. Jahrhundert. Wiesbaden: Otto Harrassowitz, (1970).
