= Siege of Lemnos (1770) =

- Part of the Russo-Turkish War (1768–1774)
Date	4 August – 22 October 1770
Location	Myrina, Lemnos, Ottoman Empire 39°52′40″N 23°03′19″E
Result	Ottoman victory

Belligerents
Ottoman Empire	Russian Empire

Commanders and leaders
(Ottoman Empire) Cezayirli Gazi Hasan Pasha	Alexei Grigoryevich Orlov

Strength
1,420	4,000

Casualties and losses
150	800

The siege of Lemnos in 1770 was part of the Aegean theatre of the Russo-Turkish War (1768–1774). The Russian navy under the command of Count Alexei Grigoryevich Orlov, which besieged the castle of Myrina on Lemnos between August 4 and 22 October 1770, retreated to the island of Paros after the Russian siege forces were defeated by the Ottomans under the command of Cezayirli Gazi Hasan Pasha, who landed on the island.

== Background ==
The Russian navy, which destroyed the Ottoman navy on July 7, 1770, at the Battle of Chesma, was left unopposed in the Aegean Sea. Although British Advisor Admiral John Elphinstone suggested forcing the Dardanelles Strait and attacking the Ottoman capital Istanbul, Russian Naval Commander Count Aleksey Orlov did not accept this suggestion. Count Orlov, who sent Elphinstone with a small fleet to the front of the Dardanelles Strait, headed towards Chios Island with his fleet, but gave up the attack when he learned that there was an epidemic on the island. On July 10, two British ships accompanying the Russian fleet left the region within the framework of Britain's policy of neutrality in the war. After the blockade attempt in front of Dardanelles Strait failed, the Russian navy headed towards Lemnos.

== Siege ==
The Russian navy entered Moudros Bay on July 26 and opened fire on the Turkish fortifications on July 31. After landing 1,400 soldiers on August 1, the siege of the castle of Myrina began on August 4. The Russian forces, who occupied the rest of the island with the support of the Greek population, encountered fierce resistance from a Turkish garrison of 350 soldiers fighting with their families at the castle.

Simultaneously, Cezayirli Gazi Hasan Pasha, who was authorized with the title of Vizier to gather the Ottoman Navy after the Çeşme disaster, went from Smyrna to Çanakkale and made plans with the former grand vizier and serasker of the Dardanelles fortresses Moldovancı Ali Pasha to relieve the siege. In this context, he planned to request 1,000 soldiers from the serasker and cross from Kumburnu to Lemnos with boats to be provided from Tenedos. However, while the Russian fleet continued the blockade in front of the Dardanelles with nine galleons, the Greek population of Tenedos also refrained from providing boats. Moldovancı Ali Pasha also postponed any operations on Lemnos until the new Kapudan Pasha, Cafer Pasha (who was appointed to replace Mandalzade Hüsameddin, who was dismissed after the Çeşme defeat) arrived in Çanakkale.

Meanwhile, the Russian unit that was tightening the siege on Lemnos received regular ammunition support from the Russian navy in Moudros Bay, seized approximately 80,000 sheep and 1,000 oxen on the island and had them slaughtered, as well as seizing grain. The Russians, who transported the local population to ships, also plundered the houses of Muslims in the suburbs of the castle. He conveyed the call for the surrender of the Russian forces (through Karakulak İbrahim Ağa, the harem steward of the former grand vizier's chamberlain İzzet Ahmet Pasha, who was taken prisoner on Chios in July) to the Turkish garrison defending the castle with 17 old cannons, some of which were broken and with little ammunition. Count Orlov gave 24 hours for the surrender of the castle and promised to leave it in place if anyone accepted an annual gold tax; and to take those who refused and wanted to leave the island with their belongings wherever they wanted. In return, he threatened to subject anyone over the age of seven to violence if his offer was rejected. The garrison stalled the embassy in the hope that help would arrive and asked for a period of 5 days. Grigory Orlov insisted on 24 hours and the garrison decided to defend the castle. In the general attack on August 31, the Russian unit suffered 150 casualties and lost the ladders they used to climb the walls and had to retreat.

At the beginning of October, the Russian force on the island increased to 4,000, while the number of soldiers in the Turkish garrison that could fight dropped to 250. The Turkish garrison, which had no strength to resist the Russian batteries that fired 1,200 cannonballs a day, decided to surrender on October 5 after holding out for two months.

Cezayirli Gazi Hasan Pasha]] left the Dardanelles with 23 ships and boats and landed a force (1,070 soldiers) from the Yoztaş port in Lemnos at the time when the garrison decided to surrender (October 7). He also conveyed the rumor to Count Orlov that he had arrived with 12,000 soldiers.

Count Orlov then lifted the siege on October 22 and began to withdraw the soldiers to the ships, but before the evacuation was complete, he was attacked by a Turkish force that had landed on the island. As a result of the five and a half hour fight, many Russian soldiers were put to the sword, and the boats in which the Russian soldiers were trying to board were sunk, and many Russian soldiers drowned. The large ships of the Russian navy left Moudros and went to Mount Athos. The Russian force left behind a lot of ammunition and supplies, and released the hostages.

== Aftermath ==
After the Russian Navy withdrew to the island of Paros, the Ottomans quickly repaired the fortress of Myrina, which had been devastated after a siege that lasted about three months, and reinforced it with 455 Janissaries.

Following his success in defeating the Russian siege of Lemnos, Cezayirli Gazi Hasan Pasha was appointed Kapudan Pasha with the title of ghazi and the rank of vizier in November 1770. He was also given the Seraskership of the Straits.

Despite the defeat of the Russian siege, the Russian navy, which did not lose any ships, continued his attacks in the Aegean Sea. However, the Russians refrained from undertaking further large-scale landing operations. For, despite the victory at Çeşme, it had become clear once again that a navy needed a significant land force to seize territory.
