= Vladimir Alexeyevich Kornilov =

Russian admiral (1806–1854)

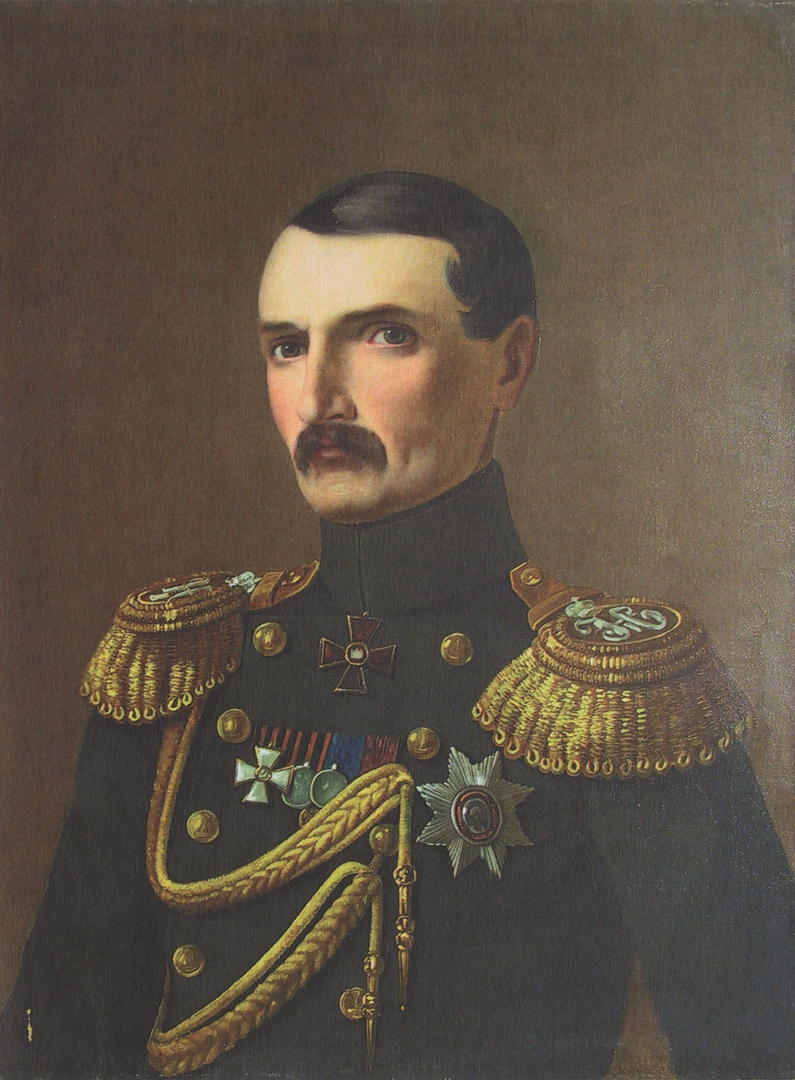
- Born: 13 February 1806; Ryasnya, Tver Governorate, Russian Empire
- Died: 17 October 1854 (aged 48); Sevastopol, Russian Empire
- Burial place: St. Vladimir's Cathedral, Sevastopol
- Relatives: Aleksandr Alekseyevich Kornilov (elder brother)
- Military career
- Allegiance: Russian Empire
- Branch: Imperial Russian Navy
- Service years: 1821–1854
- Rank: Admiral
- Conflicts: Russo-Turkish War; Battle of Navarino; Crimean War; Battle of Sinop; Siege of Sevastopol †
- Awards: Order of St. George; Order of St. Vladimir; Order of St. Anna

Vladimir Alexeyevich Kornilov (Влади́мир Алексе́евич Корни́лов; 13 February 1806 – 17 October 1854) was a Russian Imperial vice admiral who took part in the Crimean War and is known for his battle against the Pervaz-ı Bahrî in what is considered the first battle between steam ships.

== Biography ==
=== Early life and career ===
Kornilov was born on his family estate in Staritsky District, Tver Governorate in 1806. His father was governor of Irkutsk. Kornilov entered the naval service in 1823, and in 1827 he fought in the Battle of Navarino as a midshipman aboard the fleet's flagship Azov.

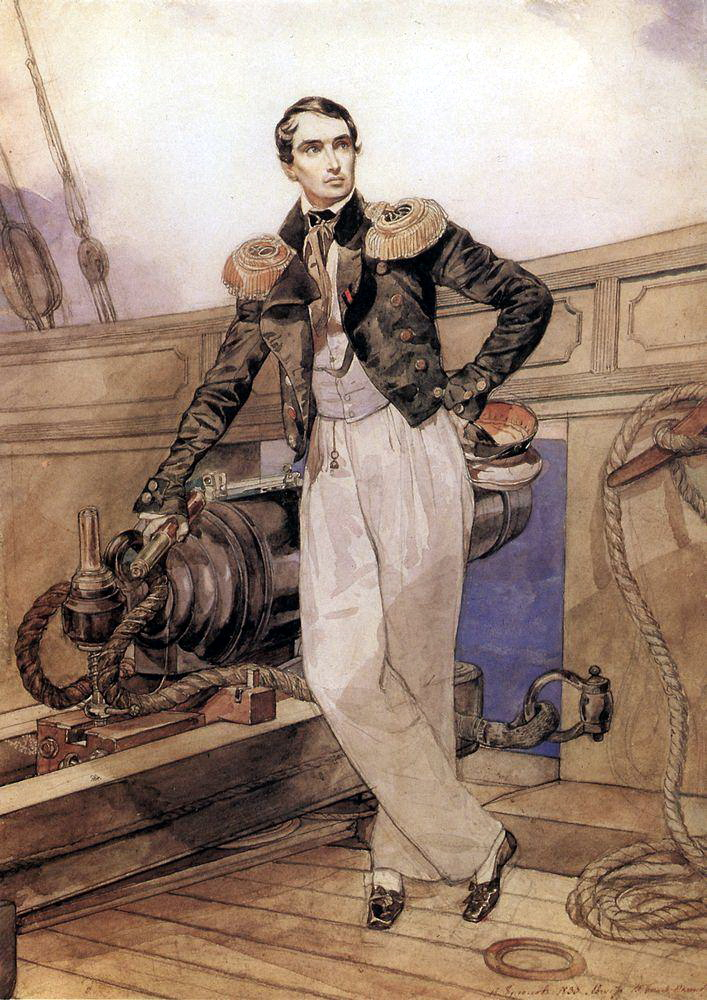
Vladimir Kornilov on Board of the Themistocles, by Karl Bryullov, 1835, watercolor and pencil; Russian Museum, St. Petersburg

In 1841 he became the first captain of the battleship Twelve Apostles, he disciplined the crew and participated with it in the Black Sea Fleet Review (held every seven years) before Grand Duke Konstantin Nikolayevich. He sailed to London in 1847 to buy a new steam frigate. In 1849 he became chief of staff Black Sea Fleet.

=== Crimean War ===
==== Battle against the Pervaz-ı Bahrî ====
The Russian Black Fleet was split into two squadrons. One of which went to Kornilov and the other to Pavel Nakhimov. Alexander Sergeyevich Menshikov tasked Kornilov to attack any Ottoman ship. He then patroled the Black Sea. After this patrol he sent most of his squadron back on Sevastopol. With himself staying in the Vladimir.

On November 17, 1853, with his flag hoisted aboard the 11-gun steam frigate Vladimir (commanded by Lieutenant-Commander Grigory I. Butakov) met a 19-gun Turkish vessel, Pervaz-ı Bahrî, when they were cruising close to Penderakli. Kornilov gave the order of engaging the enemy and Vladimir joined battle against Pervaz-Bahri. The Ottoman ship had no bow and stern artillery, so every time it employed its side artillery, Butakov manoeuvred to rake its stern. Considering that the battle was taking too long, Kornilov gave the order to speed the sinking of the enemy. Cpt. Butakov ordered to speed up the ship and approaching the enemy to around 100 metres (330 ft), fired canister rounds from all his side guns. Pervaz-Bahri had suffered heavy casualties in the three-hour-long battle and hauled its flag. The ship was transported to Sevastopol where it was commissioned into the Russian Navy as Kornilov. The battle resulted in 22 dead Ottoman Sailors, including the commander Said Pasha and another 18 wounded. Meanwhile, the Russians had two dead, and two others were injured.

==== Rest of the War ====
Sometime after the Battle against the Pervaz-Bahri, Kornilov was sent as reinforcement for Nakhimov's squadron. Kornilov arrived around the end of the Battle of Sinop, where he chased the Ottoman frigate Taif after it departed for Istanbul. However, the frigate got away.

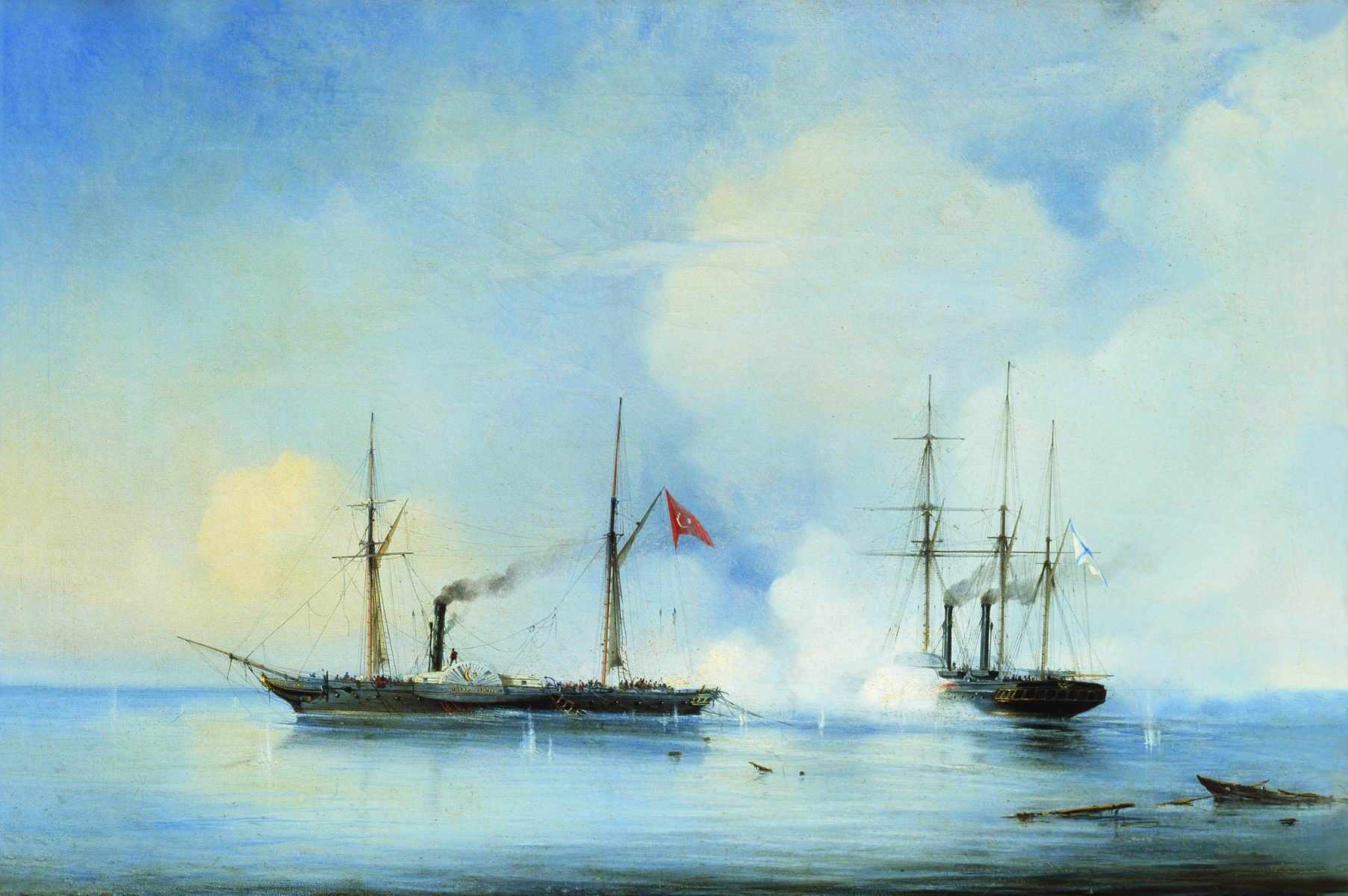
Action between Russian steam frigate Vladimir (ship, 1848) and Ottoman-Egyptian steamer Pervaz-ı Bahrî of November 5, 1853 – first action between steam ships in history, painted by Alexey Bogolyubov

During the Crimean War, Kornilov was responsible for the defence of Sevastopol. He was killed early in the siege and was buried in the Admirals' Burial Vault.

== Legacy ==
In the 1890s a statue of Kornilov alongside Pavel Nakhimov was put up in Sevastopol. A bust portraying Russian admirals and sailors from the Crimean War, including Vladimir Alexeyevich, was erected at Sevastopol Park in Dnipro (Ukraine) after renovations in 2008. His bust and the other busts in Dnipro were removed in December 2021.

== See also ==
- Pavel Nakhimov
- Vladimir Istomin
- Mikhail Lazarev
