= Boulet Asphyxiant =

The Boulet Asphyxiant was a rumoured Russian chemical weapon during the Crimean War. The rumour was first found in the French newspaper Atlas before spreading to English-language publications.

According to the rumour, the Asphyxiant was developed by a French chemical researcher, M. Fortier, in 1839. He approached the Minister of Marine, who refused to accept the design, noting "the great number of means for the destruction of human life already existing", and the proposal ended there. The same proposal was made again in 1842, this time by a M. Champion, and again rejected, ending the matter until Champion "repaired his broken fortunes in Russia".

Fortier's Asphyxiant was then allegedly discovered during the Crimean War after the Battle of Sinop; those Turkish sailors who escaped reported that the Russians were using Greek fire. This was treated as humour until a French engineer examined the destroyed ships and found that the weapons used against them were new and unknown, sending fragments to his commander, who served with an officer who had been on the Council of the Marine when Fortier made his initial proposal. The Asphyxiant, according to the rumour, was a liquid fire that exploded under the water's surface, producing a gas that suffocated anyone on the surface. The rumour was countered by allegations amongst British forces that they had invented a secret device of their own, MacIntosh's Portable Buoyant Wave Repressor, which suppressed waves.
