= Pavel Nakhimov =

Russian fleet commander (1802–1855)

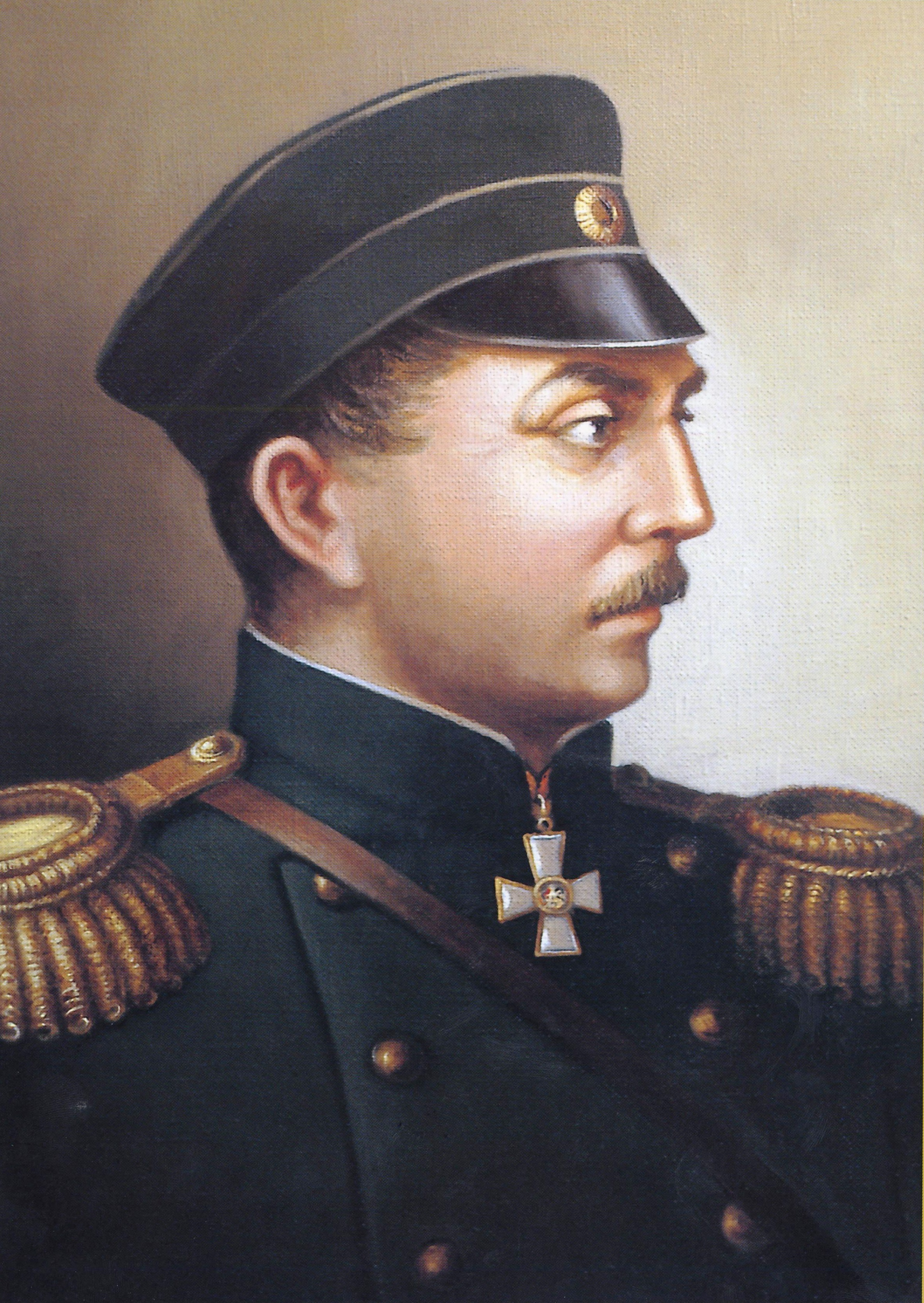
- Born: 5 July 1802; Vyazemsky Uyezd, Smolensk Governorate, Russian Empire
- Died: 12 July 1855 (aged 53); Sevastopol, Taurida Governorate, Russian Empire (Crimea)
- Burial place: St. Vladimir's Cathedral, Sevastopol
- Military career
- Allegiance: Russian Empire
- Branch: Imperial Russian Navy
- Service years: 1818–1855
- Rank: Admiral
- Commands: Corvette Navarine; Frigate Pallada; Ship of the line Silistria; Ship Brigade of the Black Sea Fleet; Chief of Fleet Division; Squadron of the Black Sea Fleet; Commander of Fleet and Port
- Conflicts: Greek War of Independence; Battle of Navarino; Russo-Turkish War (1828–29); Crimean War; Battle of Sinop; Siege of Sevastopol †
- Awards: see awards

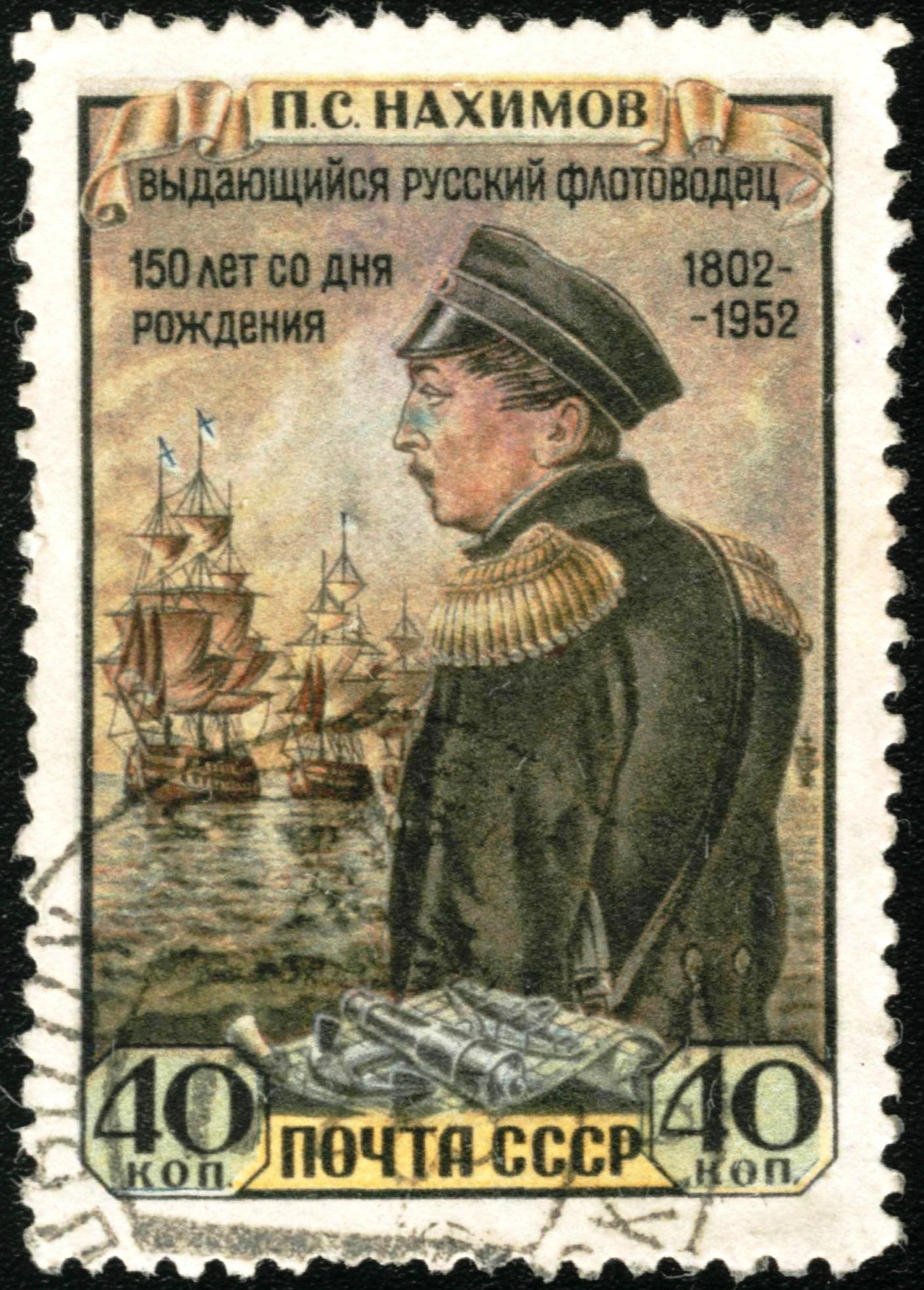
Nakhimov on a 1952 Soviet stamp

Pavel Stepanovich Nakhimov (Russian: Павел Степанович Нахимов, pronounced [ˈpavʲɪl sʲtʲɪˈpanəvʲɪtɕ nɐˈxʲiməf]; 5 July [O.S. 23 June] 1802 – 12 July [O.S. 30 June] 1855) was a Russian admiral in the Imperial Russian Navy known for his victory in the Battle of Sinop and his leadership in the Siege of Sevastopol (1854–1855) during the Crimean War.

He joined the Imperial Russian Navy and moved up the ranks, serving in the Greek War of Independence and the Russo-Turkish War (1828–29). At the beginning of the Crimean War, he delivered a significant victory at the Battle of Sinop against the Ottoman Empire. Afterward, he was a leader in the defense of Sevastopol against British, French, and Ottoman forces, during which a sniper wounded him. He died a few days later.

After his death, he became a hero in Russia, with medals and ships named after him, especially during Soviet times, starting with Stalin. Also, a Soviet Film called Admiral Nakhimov was made in 1947 about his life.

== Early life ==
Nakhimov was born in the village of Gorodok in the Vyazma district of the Smolensk Governorate into a noble Russian family. He was the seventh of eleven children of a landlord and Second Major Stepan Mikhailovich Nakhimov and his wife Feodosia Ivanovna Nakhimova (née Kozlovskaya). Six of his siblings died as infants. He and all four of his brothers would become professional seamen, including Vice Admiral Sergei Stepanovich Nakhimov (1805–1872).

== Early military career ==
In 1817, he entered the Naval Academy for the Nobility (Morskoy Dvoryanskiy Korpus) in Saint Petersburg. That year, he made his first sea voyage aboard the frigate Feniks ("Phoenix") to the shores of Sweden and Denmark. He was promoted to a non-commissioned officer soon after. In February 1818, he passed examinations to become a midshipman and was immediately assigned to the second Fleet Crew (Flotskiy Ekipazh) of the Russian Imperial Navy's Baltic Fleet.

At the beginning of his naval career, Nakhimov's experience was limited to voyages in the Baltic Sea as well as a more extensive trip from the White Sea port of Arkhangelsk to Kronstadt naval base near Saint Petersburg. His lucky break came in March 1822, when he was assigned to the frigate Kreiser ("Cruiser"); the vessel took part in a round-the-globe expedition commanded by the well-known Russian explorer Mikhail Petrovich Lazarev (1788–1851), who had already undertaken several such voyages.

During the three-year voyage, Nakhimov was promoted to the rank of lieutenant. On conclusion of this adventure, he received his first award, the Order of Saint Vladimir IV degree. He returned to his native Smolensk and was assigned to the 74-gun warship Azov, which made its maiden voyage from Arkhangelsk to Kronstadt in the autumn of 1826.

In the summer of 1827, Azov sailed to the Mediterranean as flagship of the Russian squadron under the command of Rear-Admiral Lodewijk van Heiden for a joint expedition with the French and British navies against the Ottomans. Just before its departure, Emperor Nicholas I visited the Azov and ordered that in the case of hostilities, the crew should deal with the enemy "as Russians do".

Azov, under then-Captain First Rank M.P. Lazarev, distinguished itself most prominently in the Battle of Navarino (20 October 1827), during which the allied British-French-Russian fleet "totally" destroyed the Ottoman squadron. For his outstanding gunnery performance during the battle, the 27-year-old Nakhimov was promoted to the captaincy of a trophy ship and was decorated by the allied governments.

== Crimean War and death ==
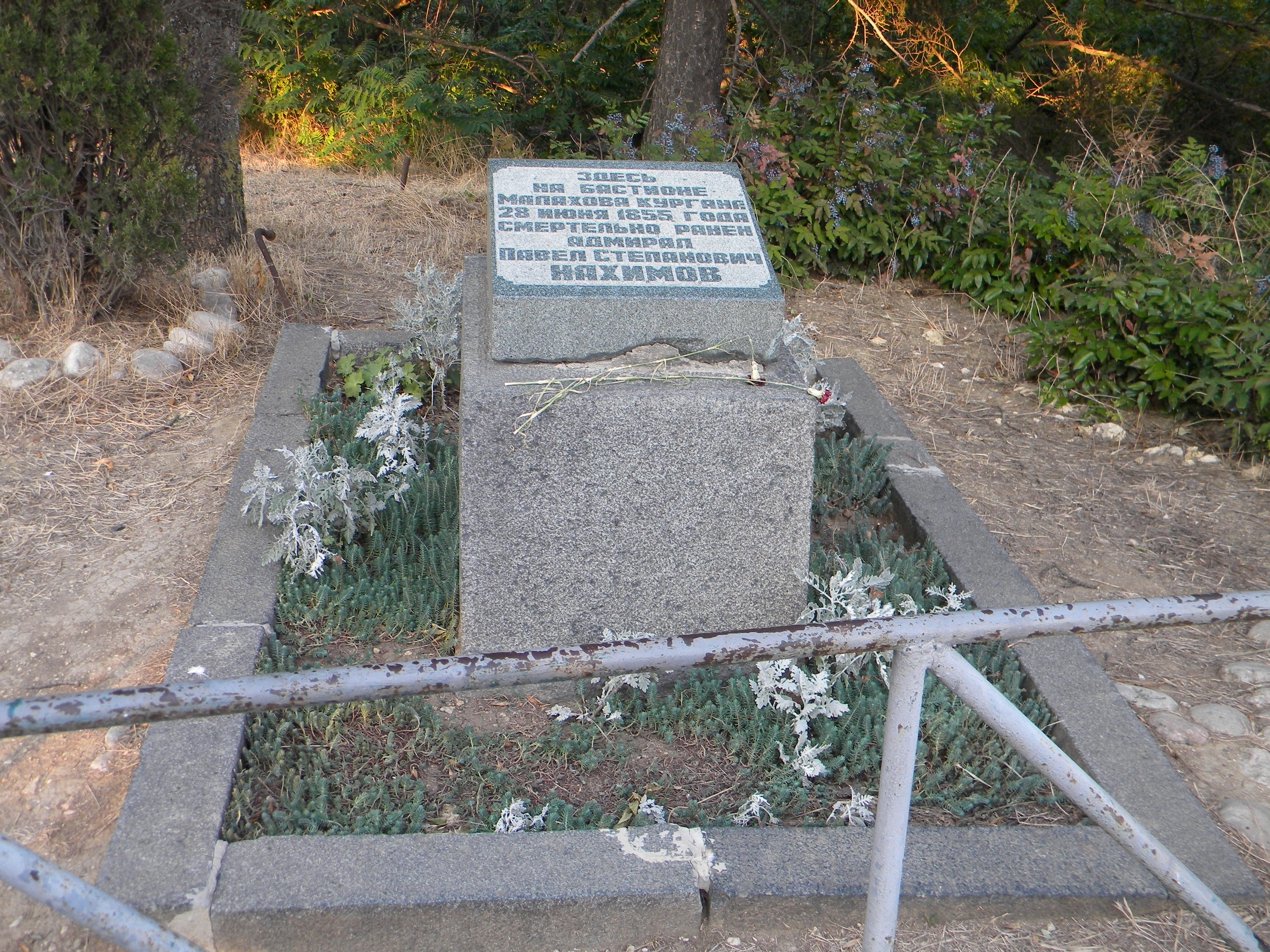
Memorial of where Nakhimov got his lethal wound

=== Battle of Sinope ===
During the Crimean War of 1853–1856 Nakhimov distinguished himself by defeating the Ottoman fleet at Sinope in 1853.

Before the battle, the Russian fleet in the Black Sea was divided into two groups, one led by Nakhimov and the other by V. A. Kornilov. Nakhimov was assigned the eastern part of the sea. Meanwhile, the Ottomans knew Russian forces had been in the open sea since November 23. Still, for various reasons, including fear of facing Russia in the open sea, they decided to remain in port. Nakhimov asked for reinforcements, which he got on November 27, 1853, when a squadron led by Admiral Fyodor Mihailovich Novosilskiy joined Nakhimov's squadron. By the time of the battle, Nakhimov had six battleships, two frigates, and three steamers and outgunned the Ottomans with weapons such as Paixhans guns.

On November 30, 1853, Nakhimov's squadron entered the bay where the Ottoman fleet commanded by Admiral Osman Pasha was. At first, the Russian squadron demanded the surrender of the Ottoman fleet. After the Ottomans refused to surrender, the battle began. At first, the Ottoman ships did well against Nakhimov's forces. However, the battle quickly turned against the Ottomans as the Russian guns proved too much, and in just a few hours, the Ottoman fleet was on fire. One ship, the Ottoman frigate Taif, started to head to Istanbul. The Russians were unable to capture the ship, even with the efforts of Russian Admiral V. A. Kornilov, who arrived with reinforcements. The Taif would arrive in Istanbul, delivering the news of Nakhimov's victory on December 2. All of the Ottoman ships, except for the Taif, were "devastated." Many Ottoman sailors died, although there is no agreement on exactly how many. Only 33–36 Russian sailors and one officer died during the battle. Admiral Osman was wounded in the foot and captured along with four other officers. Admiral Osman remained a prisoner of war until he was released in 1855.

Nakhimov kept firing during the battle despite most of the Ottoman ships being ablaze. It resulted in the burning of parts of the city, and its leaders and the Muslim population fled. He was criticized for attacking civilians during the battle. He later tried to explain his actions by sending an envoy to the city, arguing that he was seeking to "destroy the Ottoman fleet."

=== Siege of Sevastopol and death ===
His finest hour came during the Siege of Sevastopol, where he and Admiral V. A. Kornilov organized from scratch the land defense of the city and its port, the home base of the Russian Black Sea Fleet. As the commander of the port and the military governor of the city, Nakhimov became in fact the head of the Sevastopol naval and land defense forces. On 10 July [O.S. 28 June] 1855, while inspecting the forward-defense positions on Malakhov Kurgan, he was fatally wounded by a sniper and died two days later.

== Legacy ==
=== Glorification ===
After his death, Nakhimov was glorified, which included misrepresenting facts. Becoming a part of the "Sevastopol myth," in which Russian figures presented glorification of the defense of the city. This populist movement glorification of the battle was conducted alongside writers such as Leo Tolstoy. In publications, Nakhimov was represented as a "friend of the common people" and "the soul of the defense of Sevastopol." Despite his popularity with populist factions, the Imperial government did not recognize Nakhimov, as evidenced by its efforts to force artists of the panoramic painting "Defense of Sevastopol, 1854-5" to remove his figure and replace it with Mikhail Dmitrievich Gorchakov.

Despite him not being included in official government accounts, he was later honored in the Soviet Union by propagandists. During World War II, Nakhimov was turned into a national hero by the Soviet Union and Stalin alongside other figures like Prince Pyotr Bagration, Mikhail Kutuzov, Aleksandr Nevsky, and Aleksandr Suvorov.

=== Monuments and tributes ===
There are many monuments and medals created in his memory. In the 1890s a statue of Nakhimov along with Vladimir Alexeyevich Kornilov was put in Sevastopol. A bust portraying Russian admirals and sailors from the Crimean War, including Nakhimov, was erected at Sevastopol Park in Dnipro (Ukraine) after renovations in 2008. His bust and the other busts in Dnipro were removed in December 2021.

Nakhimov was buried inside St Vladimir's Cathedral in Sevastopol along with Mikhail Lazarev, V.A. Kornilov and Vladimir Istomin. There is a monument erected in his memory. The Soviet government instituted posthumous honors as well, introducing Nakhimov Naval Schools for teenagers in 1943, and establishing in 1944 both the Order of Nakhimov (with two degrees) and the Nakhimov Medal for Navy personnel. The Order of Nakhimov, one of the highest military decorations in the Soviet Union, continues to exist in the Russian Federation.

=== Ships named after Nakhimov ===
- Admiral Nakhimov, a Russian armoured cruiser.
- Original name of Chervona Ukraina, a Svetlana-class cruiser.
- Admiral Nakhimov, a Sverdlov-class cruiser.
- Admiral Nakhimov, a Soviet passenger liner.
- Admiral Nakhimov, a Kresta II-class cruiser.
- Admiral Nakhimov (formerly Kalinin), a Kirov-class battlecruiser

=== Honours and awards ===
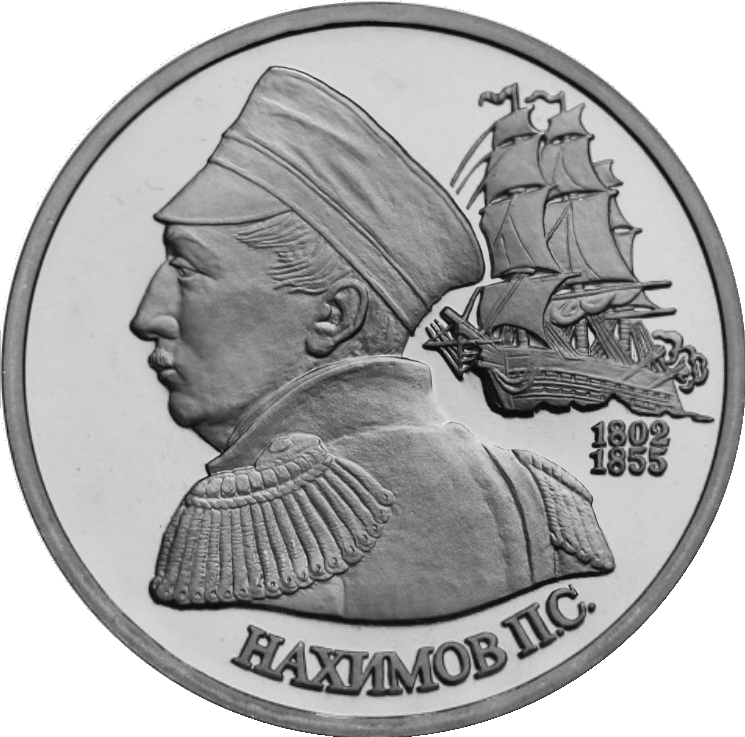
Russian 1 rouble coin commemorating the 190th anniversary of Nakhimov's birth.

- Order of St. Vladimir, 4th class (1825; the voyage on the frigate Cruiser)
- Order of Saint George, 4th class (1827; for service in the Battle of Navarino
- Order of St. Anna, 2nd class (1830)
- Order of St. Anna, 2nd class with the Imperial Crown (1837; for diligent and zealous excellent service)
- Order of St. Vladimir, 3rd class (1842; for diligent and zealous excellent service)
- Badge of distinction "For impeccable service" XXV years. (1846)
- Order of St. Stanislaus, 1st class (1847)
- Order of St. Anna, 1st class (1849)
- Order of St. Anna, 1st class with the Imperial Crown (1851)
- Order of St. Vladimir, 2nd class (1853; For the successful transfer of 13th Division)
- Order of Saint George, 2nd class (1853; For the victory at Sinope)
- Order of the White Eagle (Russia), (1855; For actions in the defence of Sevastopol)
- Order of the Bath (United Kingdom)
- Order of the Redeemer (Greece)

== In popular culture ==
The 1947 Soviet movie Admiral Nakhimov, directed by Vsevolod Pudovkin, is about the life of Nakhimov. Soviet actor Aleksei Dikiy played Nakhimov. The movie covers Nakhimov's victory in the Battle of Sinop and his defense of Sevastopol. The film had to be remade by Pudovkin as the Communist Party of the Soviet Union viewed the original film as having too much "dancing" and misrepresenting historical facts. Pudovkin removed the love story and "toned down" the dance scenes.

== Gallery ==
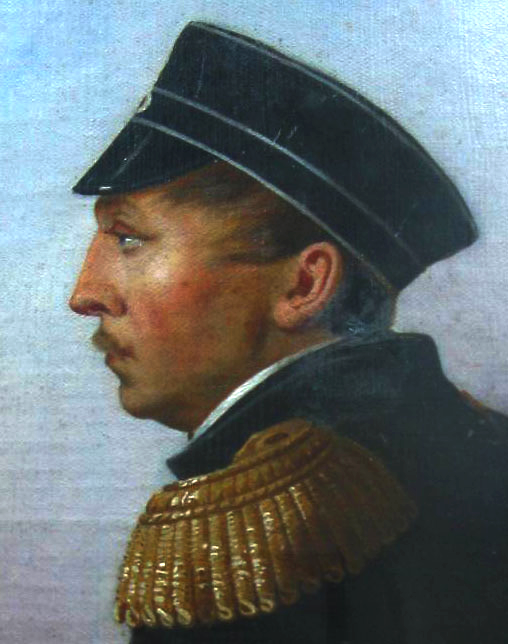
Portrait of Pavel Nakhimov, by Georg Wilhelm Timm

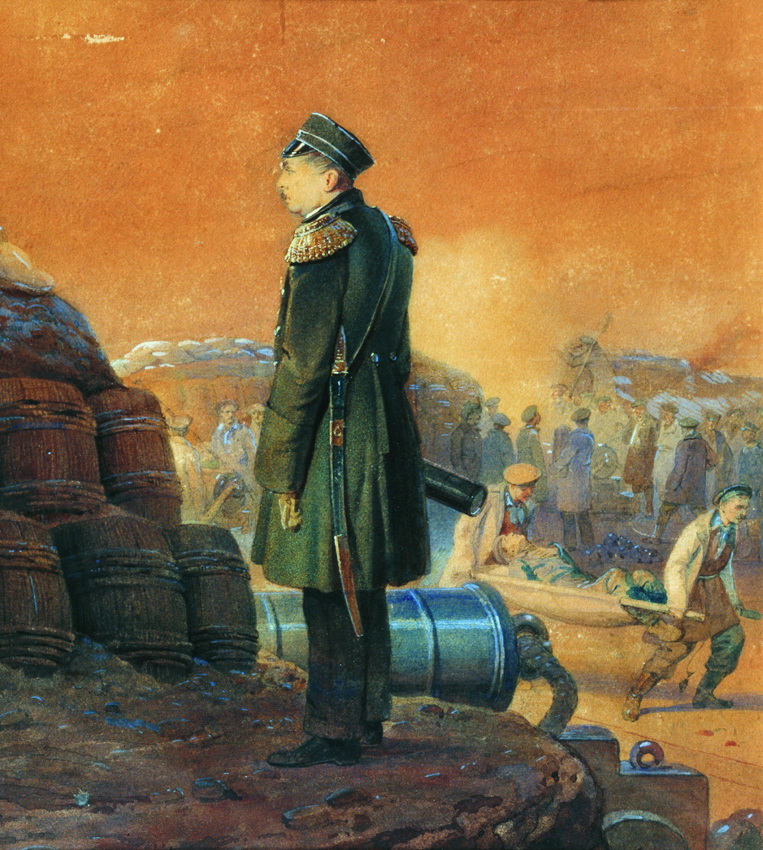
Painting of Pavel Nakhimov, by Georg Wilhelm Timm

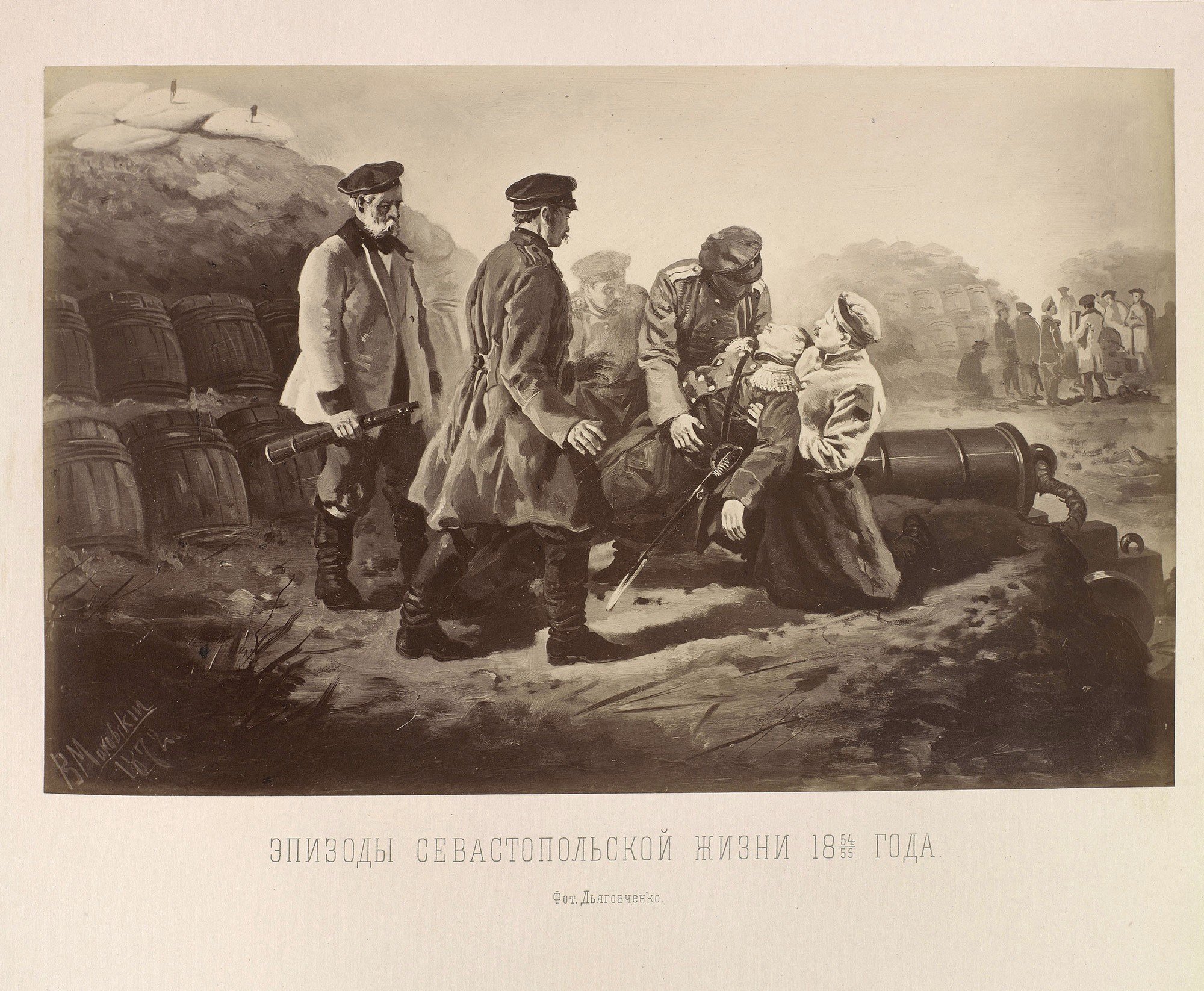
Pavel Nakhimov's lethal injury, by Ivan Dyagovchenko

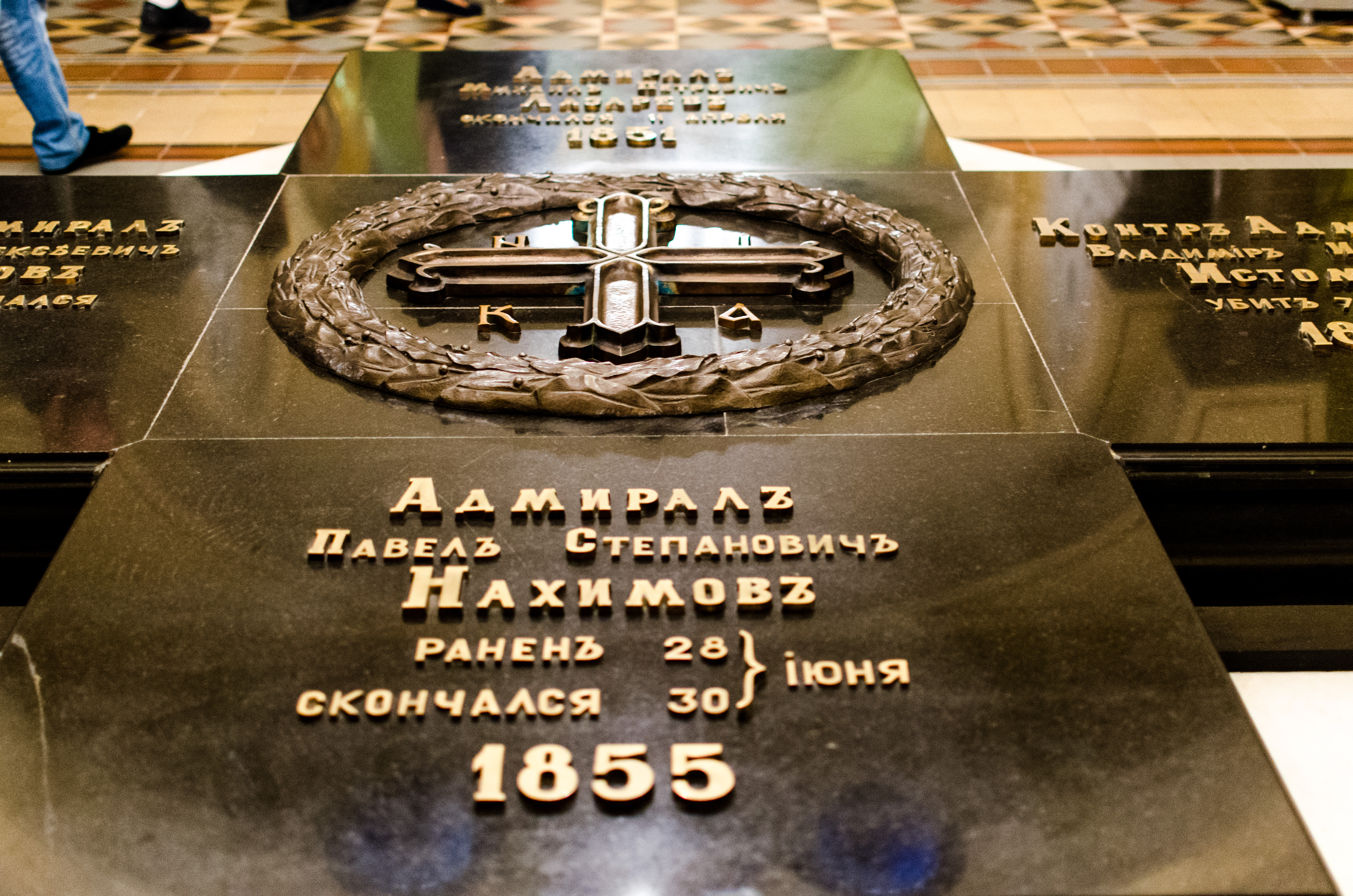
Nakhimov's grave in St. Vladimir's Cathedral, Sevastopol

== See also ==
- Admiral Nakhimov (film)
- Osman Pasha (naval officer)
- Vladimir Alexeyevich Kornilov
- Battle of Sinop
