= Medal of Nakhimov =

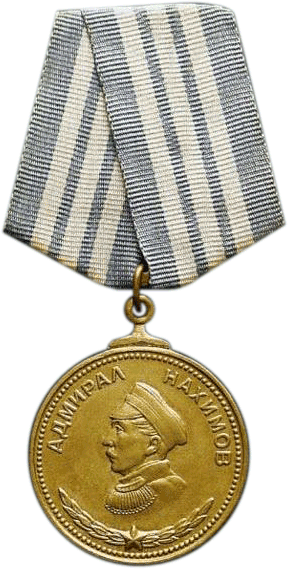
- Medal of Nakhimov (obverse)
- Type: Military decoration
- Awarded for: Bravery and courage in naval theatres
- Presented by: USSR
- Eligibility: Soldiers and sailors of the Navy and Border Guards
- Status: No longer awarded
- Established: March 3, 1944

Highlights
- Total: ~14,020
- Ribbon of the Medal of Nakhimov

The Medal of Nakhimov (Russian: Медаль Нахимова) was a military decoration of the Soviet Union.

== Award history ==
The Medal of Nakhimov was a Soviet military award created on March 3, 1944 by decision of the Supreme Soviet of the USSR to reward distinction in the defence of the socialist homeland and to actively recognise successful combat missions on ships, in units of the Navy or of Border Guards. It was named in honour of Russian admiral Pavel Nakhimov, one of the most famous admirals in Russian naval history. Following the dissolution of the Soviet Union in 1991, the award was potentially and only temporarily retained by Decree No 2424-1 of the Presidium of the Supreme Soviet of the Russian Federation of March 2, 1992. It was never awarded under the Russian Federation and finally removed from the list of state awards by decree of the President of the Russian Federation of March 2, 1994.

== Award statute ==
The Medal of Nakhimov was awarded to sailors and soldiers, petty officers and sergeants, ensigns and warrant officers of the Soviet Navy, Naval Infantry and naval units of the Soviet Border Troops for courage and bravery displayed during the defence of the Soviet Union in naval theatres, while protecting the maritime borders of the USSR, during military duties with a risk to life. 14,020 people were awarded the Medal of Nakhimov from its creation in 1944 to its abolishment in 1994.

The Medal of Nakhimov was worn on the left side of the chest and when in the presence of other orders and medals of the Soviet Union, it was situated immediately after the Medal "For Battle Merit". If worn in the presence of orders or medals of the Russian Federation, the latter have precedence.

== Award description ==
The Medal of Nakhimov was a 36mm in diameter circular bronze medal with a raised rim. The obverse had at its center the relief left profile bust of admiral Nakhimov, surrounded by small beading along the entire medal circumference, also along the circumference, in the upper half on either side of the bust, the relief inscription "ADMIRAL NAKHIMOV" (Russian: «АДМИРАЛ НАХИМОВ»), in the lower half, a relief five pointed star over laurel branches. The reverse bore the same small beading along the entire circumference. At the center a medallion bearing a sailing ship surrounded by a ring of rope over crossed naval anchors connected together by a circular chain surrounding the medallion and passing below the lower tips of the anchors.

The Medal of Ushakov was suspended from a standard Soviet pentagonal mount by a ring through the suspension loop. The mount was covered by an overlapping 24mm wide silk moiré blue ribbon with three central 3mm wide white stripes situated 2mm apart.

== See also ==
- Awards and decorations of the Soviet Union
- Order of Nakhimov
