= Sevastopol Park =

Park in Dnipro, Ukraine

- Севастопольський парк
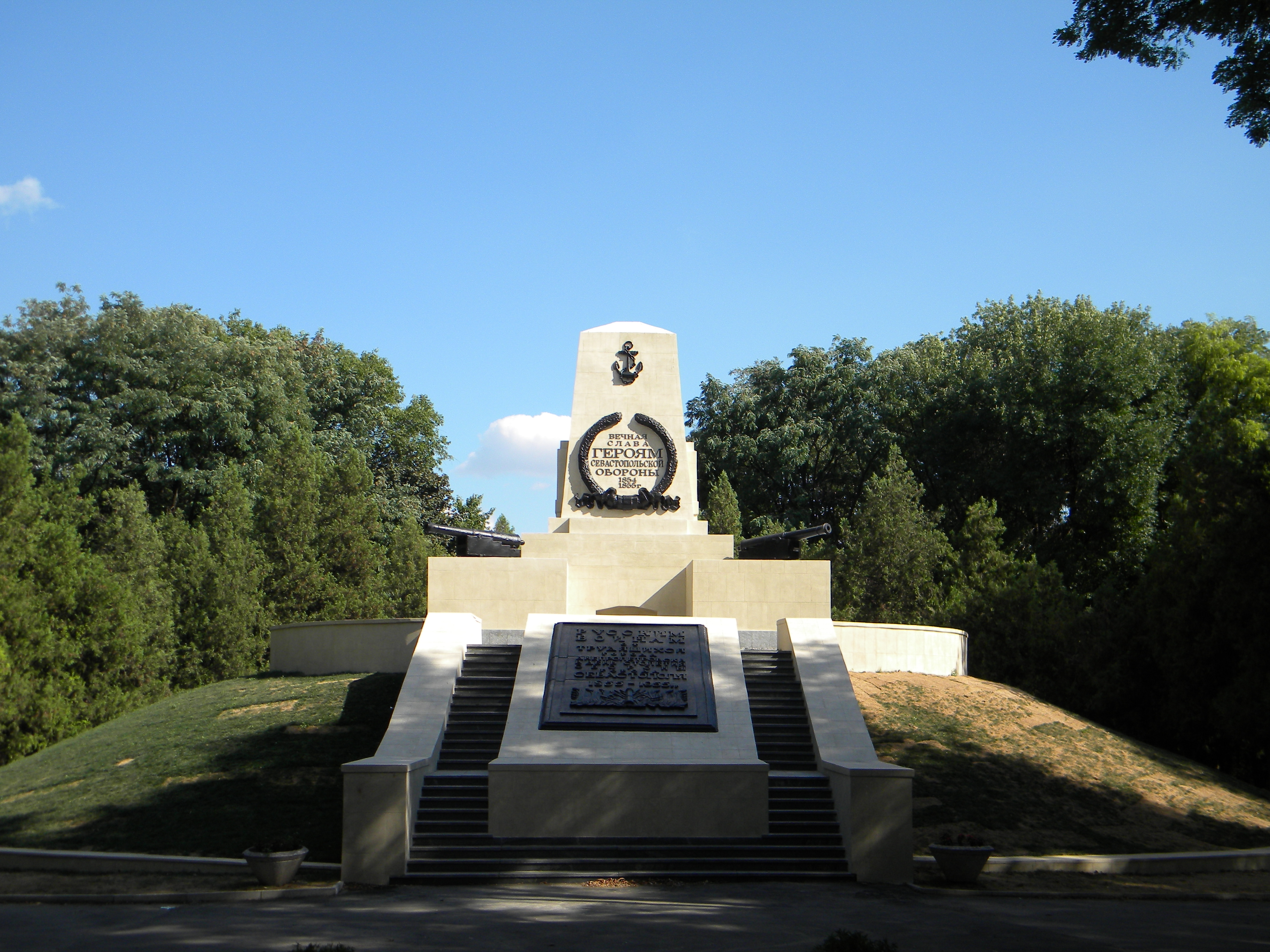
- Monument at the park photographed in 2010
- Interactive map of Sevastopol Park
- Type: Urban park
- Location: Dnipro
- Coordinates: 48°26′48″N 35°03′39″E
- Area: 6.5 hectares (16 acres)
- Opened: 3 May 2008
- Etymology: Siege of Sevastopol
- Operator: Dnipro City Council
- Status: culture and recreational park

The Sevastopol Park (Ukrainian: Севастопольський парк, romanized: Sevastopolskyi park) is a memorial park and mass grave in the city of Dnipro, Ukraine. In commemoration of the 100th anniversary of the Siege of Sevastopol, the park was established in 1955.

On the park's main lane there is monument honoring the soldiers of the siege. It was built by architect Petrov and given to the city, constructed from materials collected from Sevastopol itself. This monument was partly destructed on the order of the Dnipro city council on 7 June 2024 to comply with derussification laws. By June 2025 the monument was in a dreadful state. A fence was placed at the front of the monument to keep out animals that had begun to remove bones from the mass grave.

== History ==
During the Siege of Sevastopol Fromm 1854 to 1855, the whole of what is now Dnipro (Note: Dnipro has been renamed multiple time; it has its current name since 2016 when it was renamed (from Dnipropetrovsk) to comply with decommunization laws. It was named Dnipropetrovsk from 1926. The city was originally known as Katerynoslav.) was a strategically significant location on the military operations map during the Crimean War. The location functioned as the southern frontier area leading to Crimea. This location also housed army units, command centers, and military hospitals. This was the closest safe area for all the injured and is significant to remember that Katerynoslav (as the city of Dnipro was called at the time) received the captured French, British, and Turks.

Potemkin Palace and Mechnikov Hospital served as military hospitals during the period. The fallen soldiers were laid to rest at a hospital cemetery situated on the grounds of the present-day Sevastopol Park. In 2008 historians from Dnipro (the city was then named Dnipropetrovsk) and the surrounding area claim that over 40,000 Russo-Turkish War soldiers are interred here. On different sides of the same hill, they were buried. Later on, the nearby Sevastopol Park and the commemorative monument were established there.

A tiny chapel was constructed at the cemetery in 1863. However, Emperor Alexander II visited Ekaterinoslav (Dnipro's name at the time) in October of that same year, and on his own initiative, the chapel was restored and dedicated in honor of the Lazarus of Bethany. The church was shuttered and largely demolished during the 1930s. Ivan Manzhura, a Ukrainian poet and democrat, was buried in 1893 on land that would eventually become Sevastopol Park. When the church was finished in 1894, a two-story bell tower was built. The USSR's anti-religious campaign demolished the church, but some of its ruins survived and provided the foundation for the mound that would eventually be built.

The cemetery was devastated during the World War II and rebuilt in 1956. A mound with a monument atop it crumbled during the Siege of Sevastopol, by Nazi German forces. Originally intended to be cleared out and replaced with a vegetable greenhouse, the cemetery was turned into a memorial garden in 1953. Monuments and memorials were erected on the main lane, and alongside them—on the burials of thousands of city dwellers—were constructed a children's playground, a dance floor, a movie theater, and even a bar.

Sevastopol Park received the designation of a monument in 1977. Nevertheless, the memorial became abandoned throughout the years of Ukraine's independence. The park ran out of money in the 1990s, and everything came to a halt and abandoned. The park was attempting to come back to life in the mid-1990s, so they began construction and the bar reopened. However, the workmen discovered the coffins and bones. People in the neighboring areas started to protest against the development, the construction was again halted. The bones of an unidentified man were discovered in 1997 while the park was being rebuilt. Although there were speculations that he recognized Alexander Pol, the inspection revealed that the bones were not his.

A square named for the young scouts was inaugurated and refurbished in the following decade. Sevastopol Memorial Park opened to the public on 3 May 2008, the 225th anniversary of Sevastopol and Victory Day. Diplomats from the Russian Federation Consulate General in Ukraine, a delegation from the city consisting of the Sevastopol veterans, the Dnipropetrovsk diocesan clergy, Cossacks, young sailors from the Dnieper Flotilla, and civilians all attended the event.

In 2020, while conducting archeological digs, archaeologists discovered the tomb of the protopop, from the late 1800s who was maybe the Lazarov Church's rector. The church's foundation, burials and crypts, were unearthed during a 109 UAH renovation work in 2021. Alexander Pol's remains were discovered and was later reburied in a new grave a 100 metres (330 ft) from the actual resting place. A labradorite slab over his new grave would be placed near the central lane.

The park would be closed for redevelopment, which was expected to take longer than a year, from 18 October to 31 December 2022. Since the beginning of the Russian Invasion of Ukraine in 2022, work has been put on hold. In May 2023 he park was deteriorated, with several deep holes and broken tiles on monuments. The memorial plaque that was dedicated to the defenders of Sevastopol was removed on 7 June 2024 on the orders of the Dnipro city council to comply with the law "On the Condemnation and Prohibition of Propaganda of Russian Imperial Policy in Ukraine and the Decolonization of Toponymy" (as part of the campaigns to derussificate and decolonization of Ukraine). Commenting on the removal the city council stated that they would contact local museums regarding the possible museumification of the dismantled structures. In June 2025 the monument in the park was still deteriorated. A fence was placed at the front of the monument to prevent animals entering the mass grave beneath the monument where they had begun to remove bones from the mass grave.

== Landmarks and structures ==
There was a commemorative monument on the location of the mass burial that had a staircase, but this monument's memorial plaque was removed on 7 June 2024 on the orders of the Dnipro city council to comply with the law "On the Condemnation and Prohibition of Propaganda of Russian Imperial Policy in Ukraine and the Decolonization of Toponymy" (as part of the campaigns to derussificate and decolonization of Ukraine). One of the park's distinctive features was the arch in front of the entrance, which eventually collapsed because of structural instability brought on by the trams that went through it every day. On 7 June 2024 the memorial plaque was dumped in front of the monument, leaving two big holes in the entire monument. Defensive weaponry were among the components that the architects employed to decorate the monument, but these connons were removed in June 2025. The cannons were removed by the Dmytro Yavornytsky National Historical Museum of Dnipro, the further fate of the guns was not communicated.

Following renovation in 2008, busts depicting Russian admirals and sailors from the Crimean War was placed in the park. All busts were removed in December 2021. The people honored with a bust were:

- Nikolay Pirogov (1810–1881), a medical doctor and scientist
- Ignatiy Shevchenko (died 1855), a sailor of the Imperial Russian Navy
- Koshka Markovich (1828–1882), a sailor of the Imperial Russian Navy
- Zaika Fedor, a sailor of the Imperial Russian Navy
- Sevastopol Dasha, a Sister of Mercy
- Pavel Nakhimov (1802–1855), admiral of the Imperial Russian Navy
- Vladimir Kornilov (1806–1854), vice admiral of the Imperial Russian Navy
- Vladimir Istomin (1810–1855), rear admiral of the Imperial Russian Navy
Busts at the Sevastopol Park

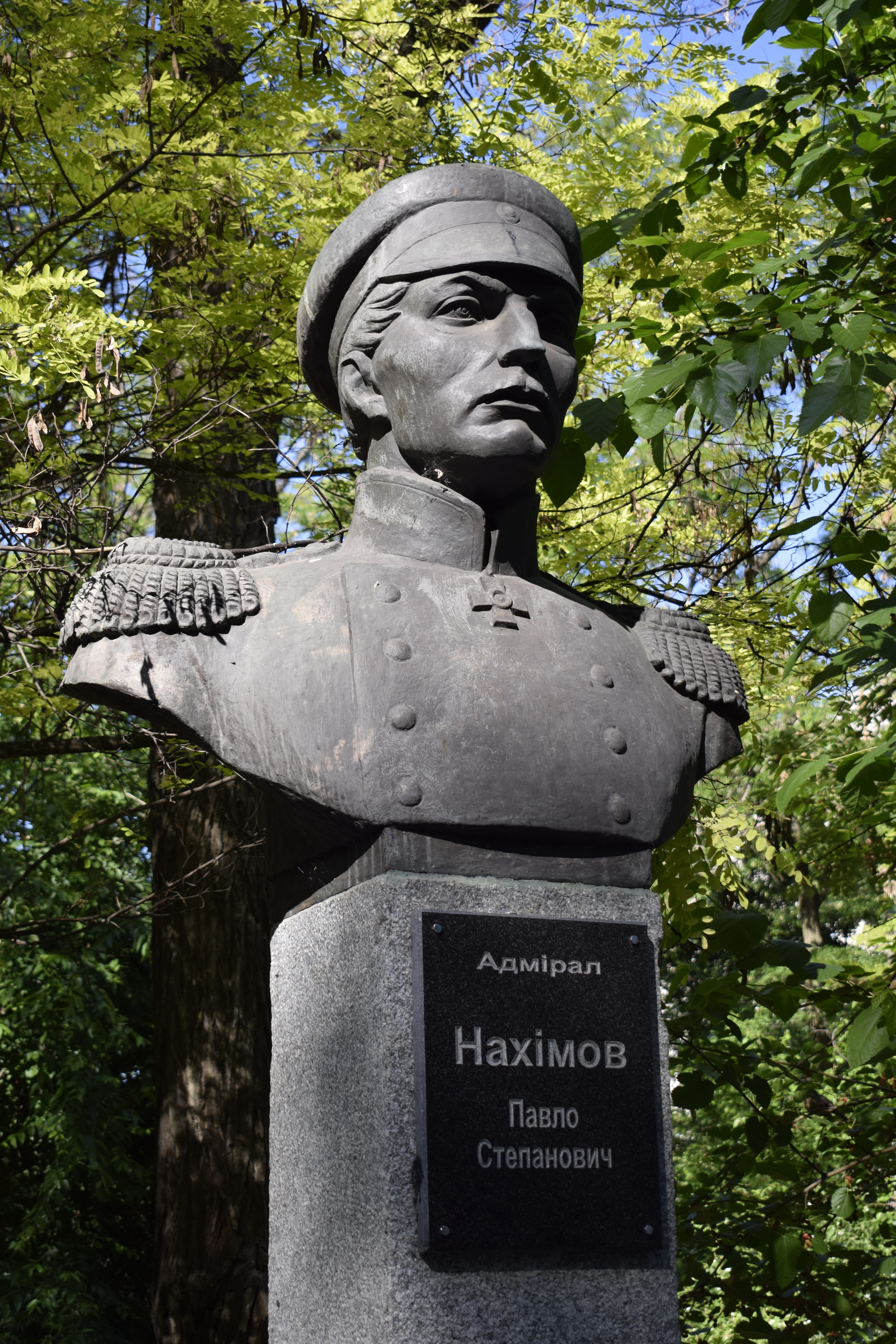
Pavel Nakhimov

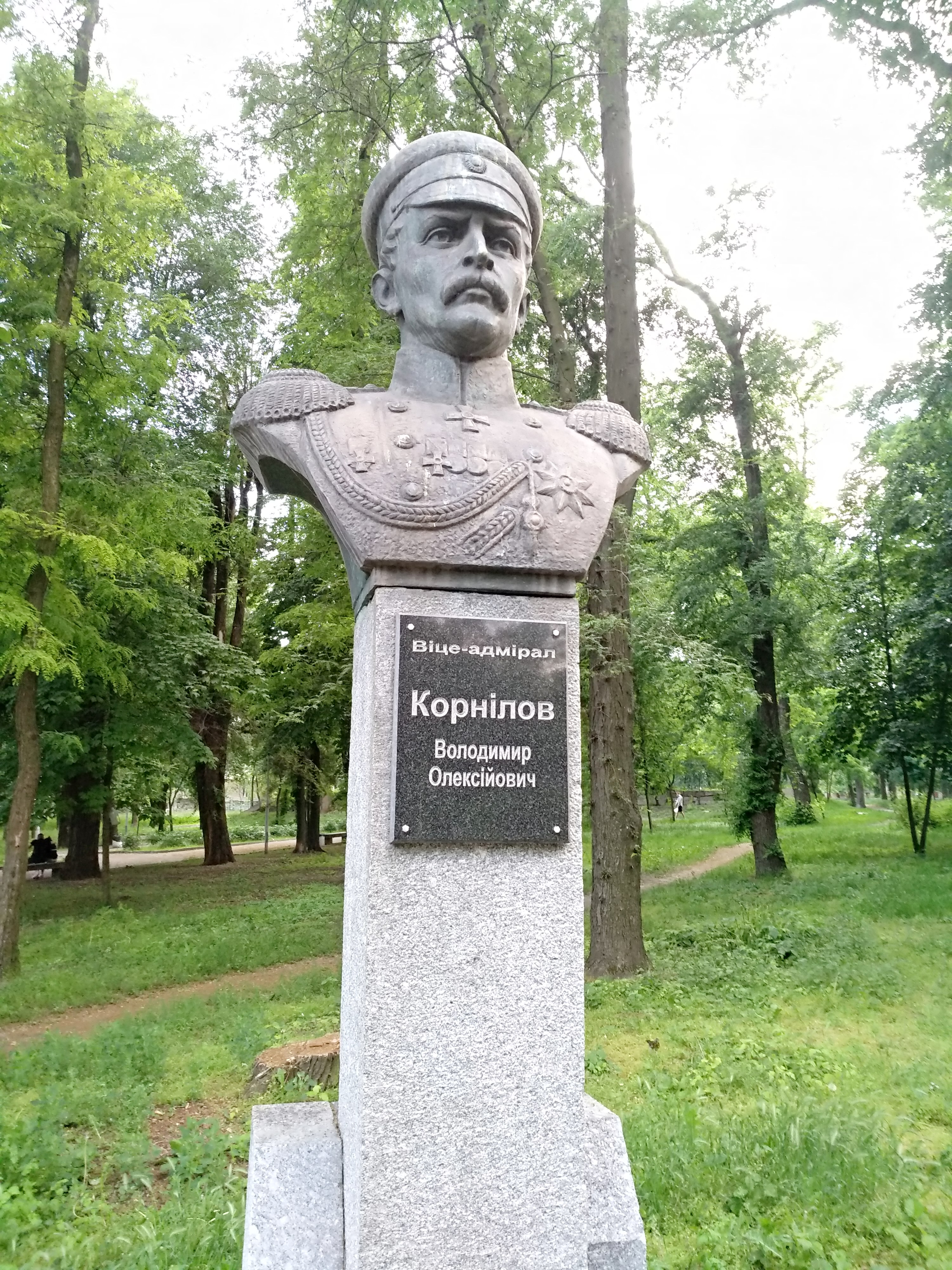
Vladimir Kornilov

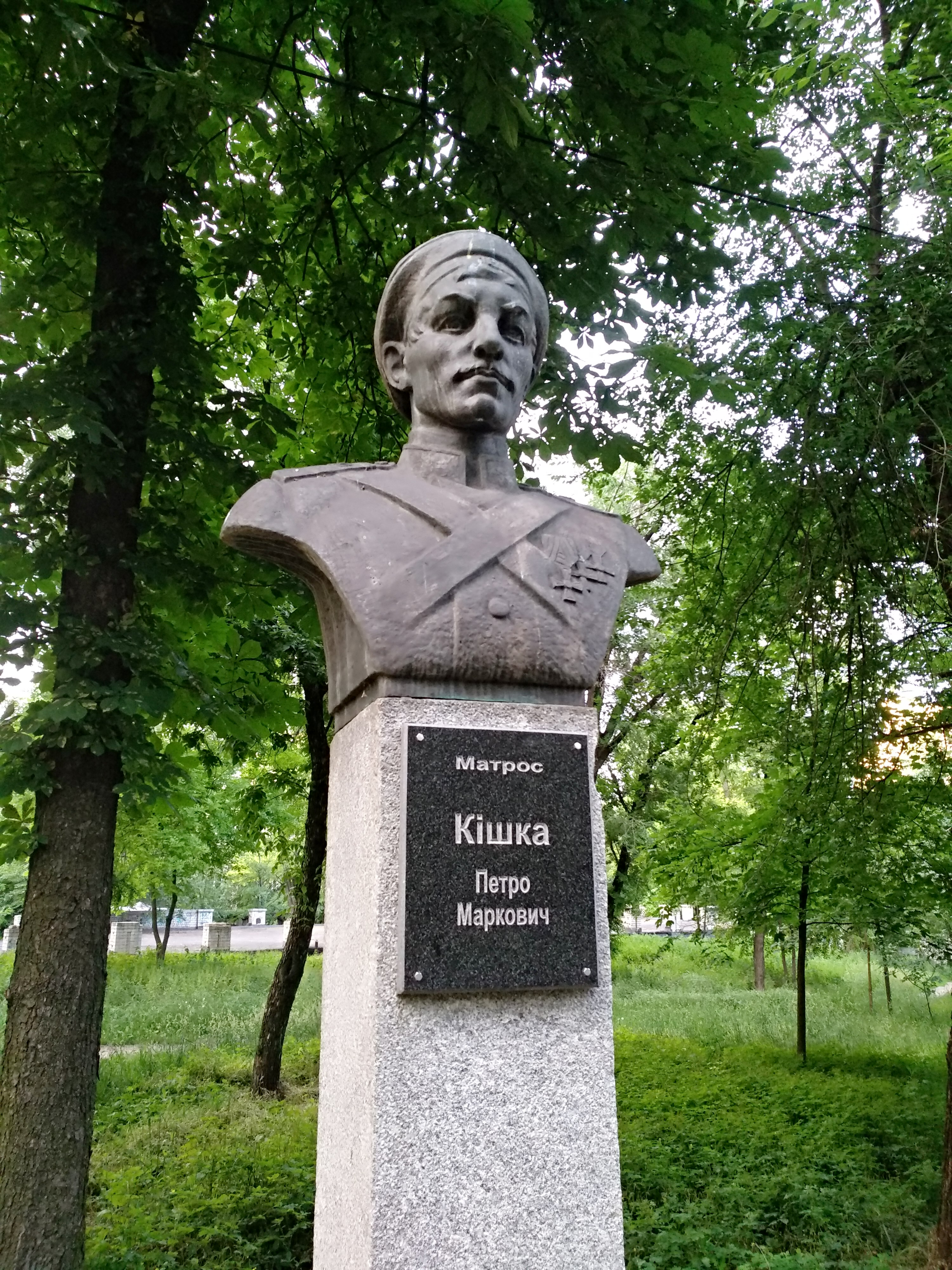
Koshka Markovich

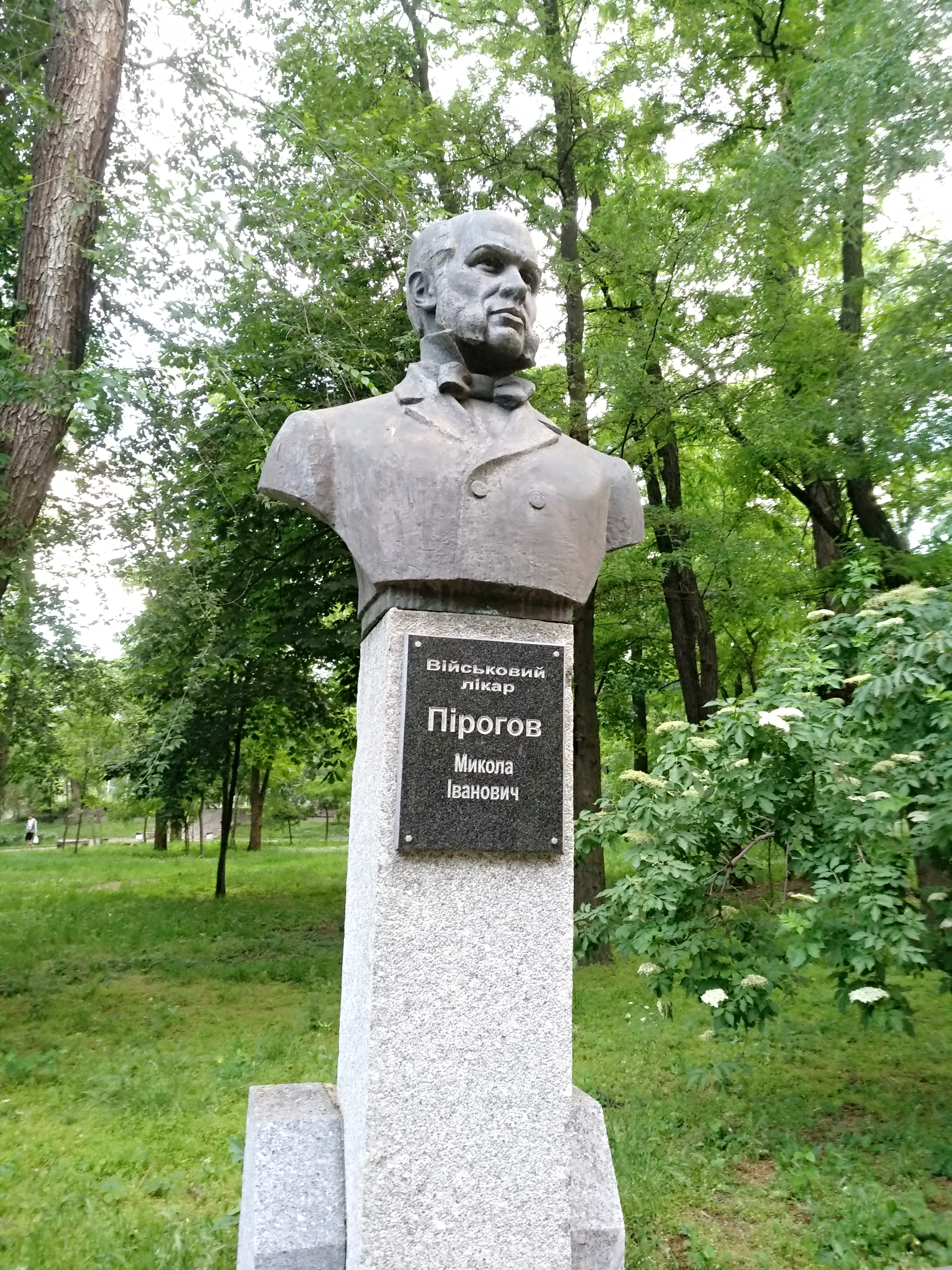
Nikolay Pirogov

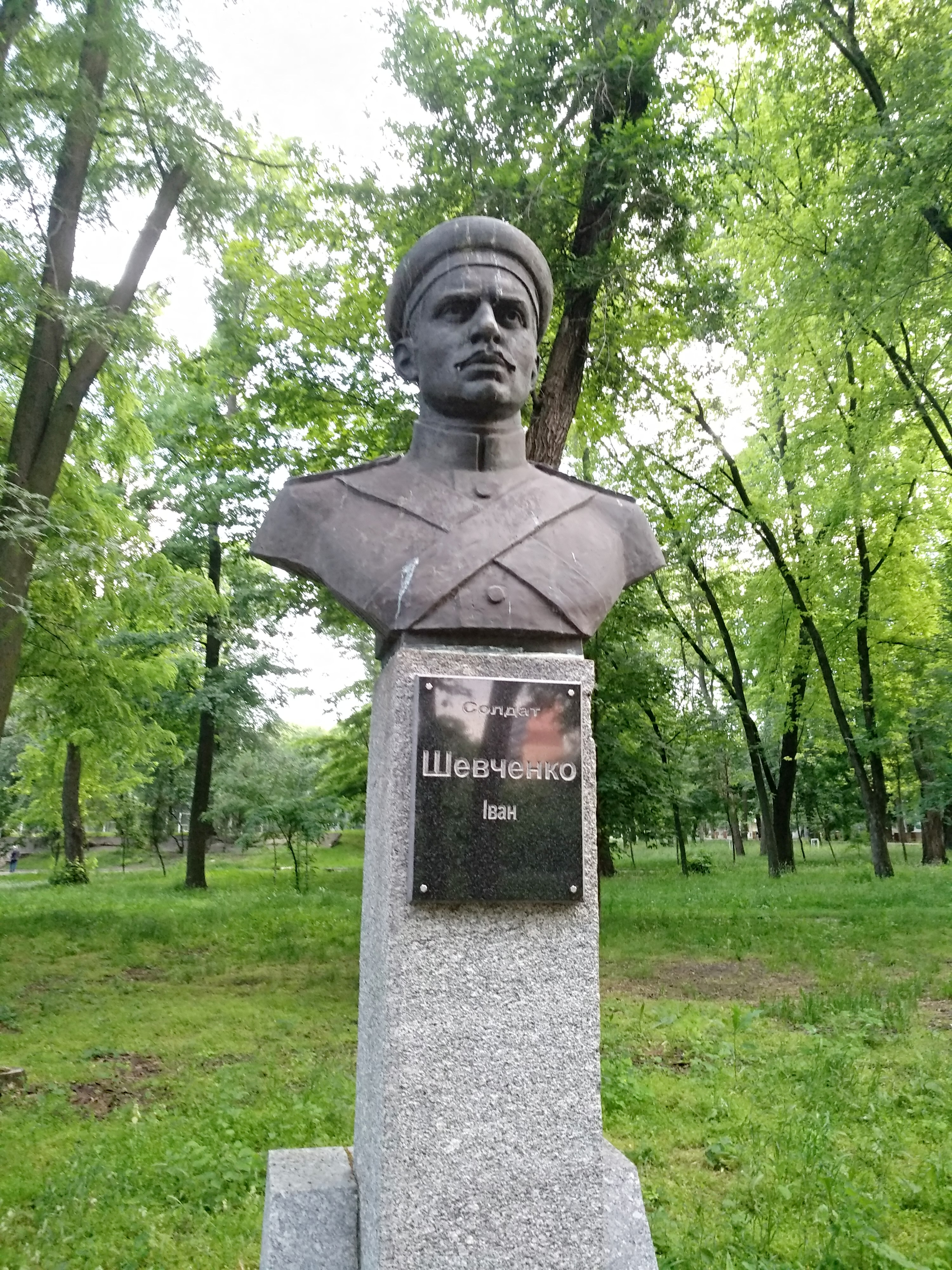
Ignatiy Shevchenko

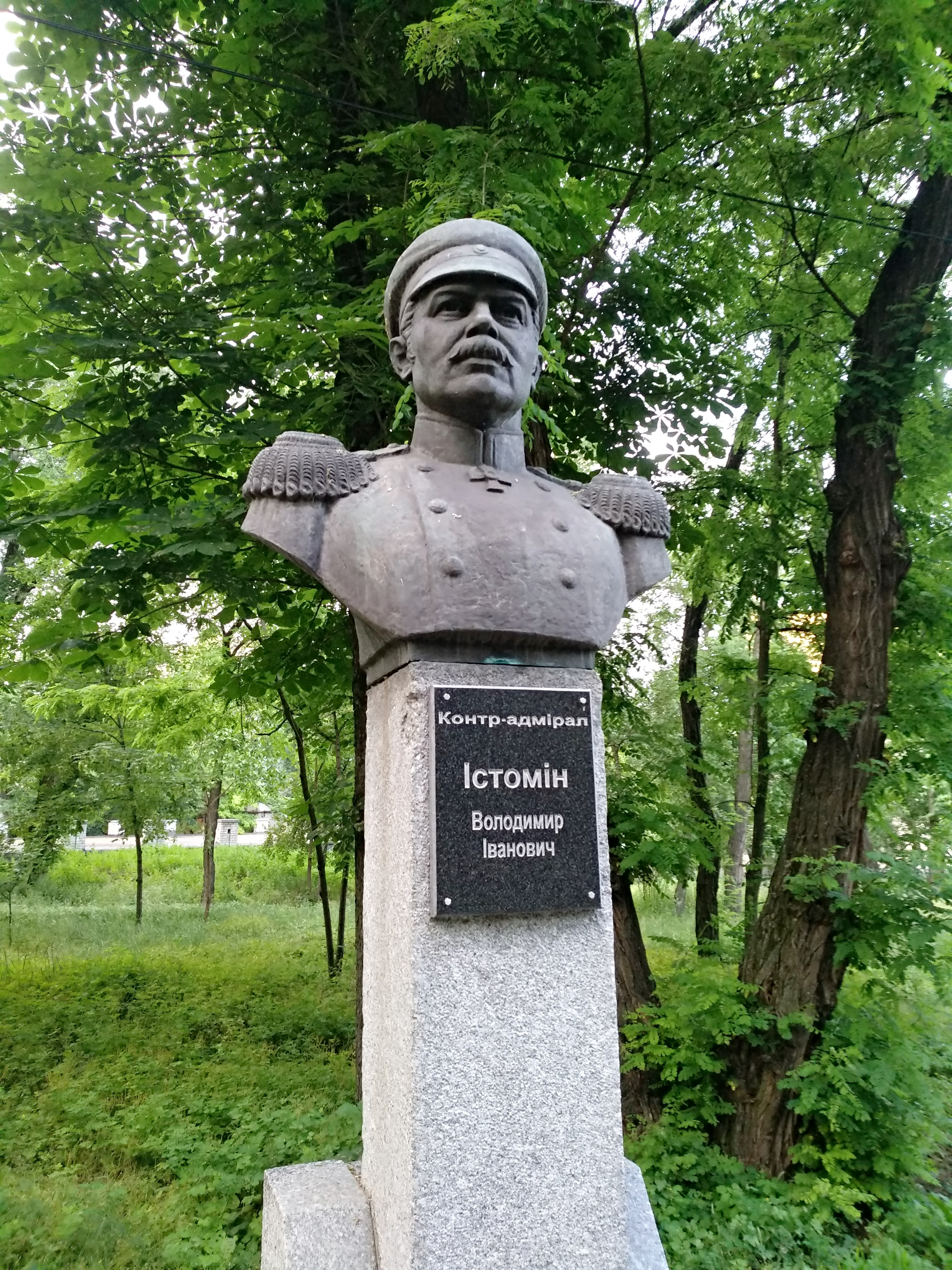
Vladimir Istomin

== Gallery ==
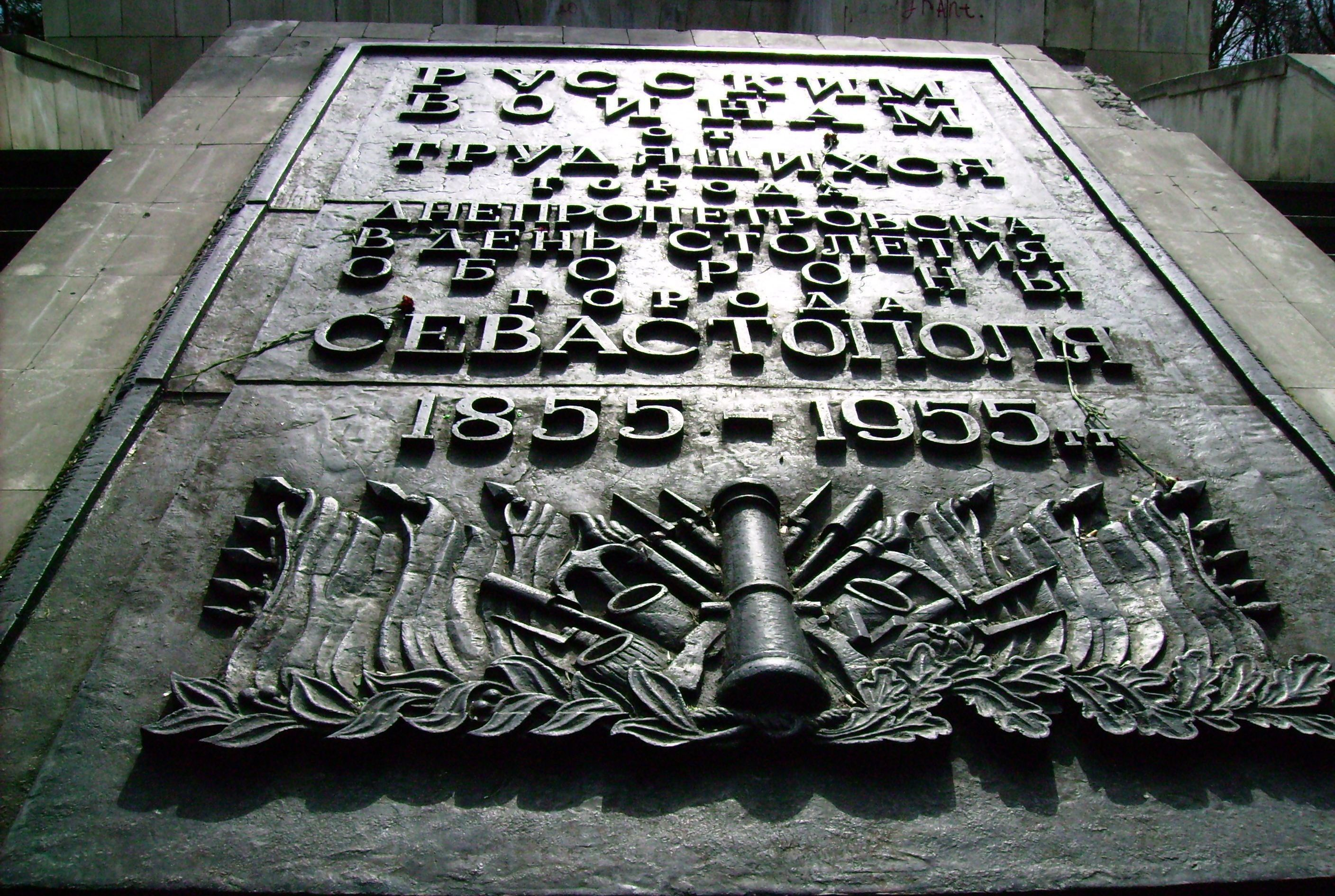
The monument's plaque in 2006

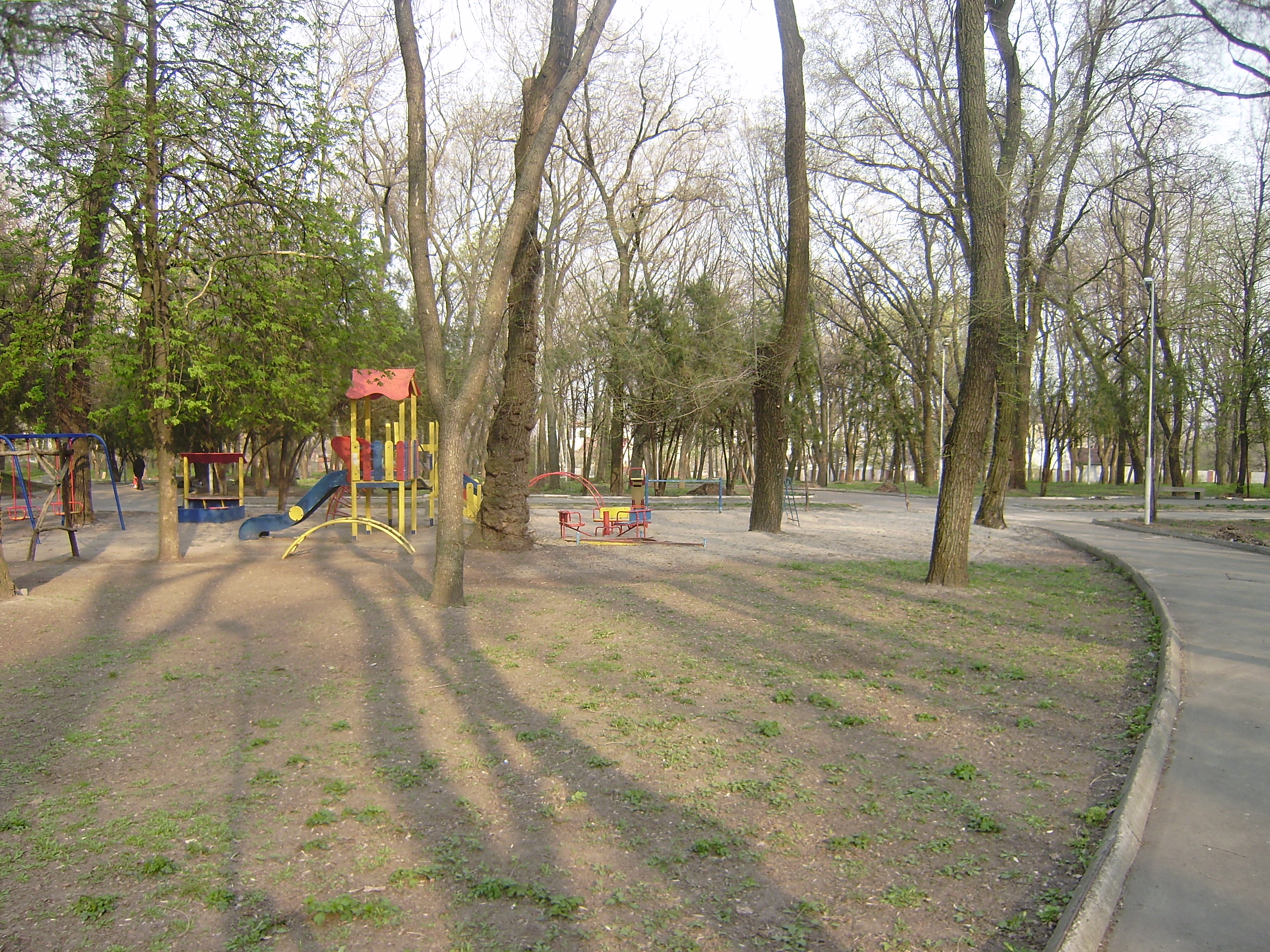
The park's playground in 2013

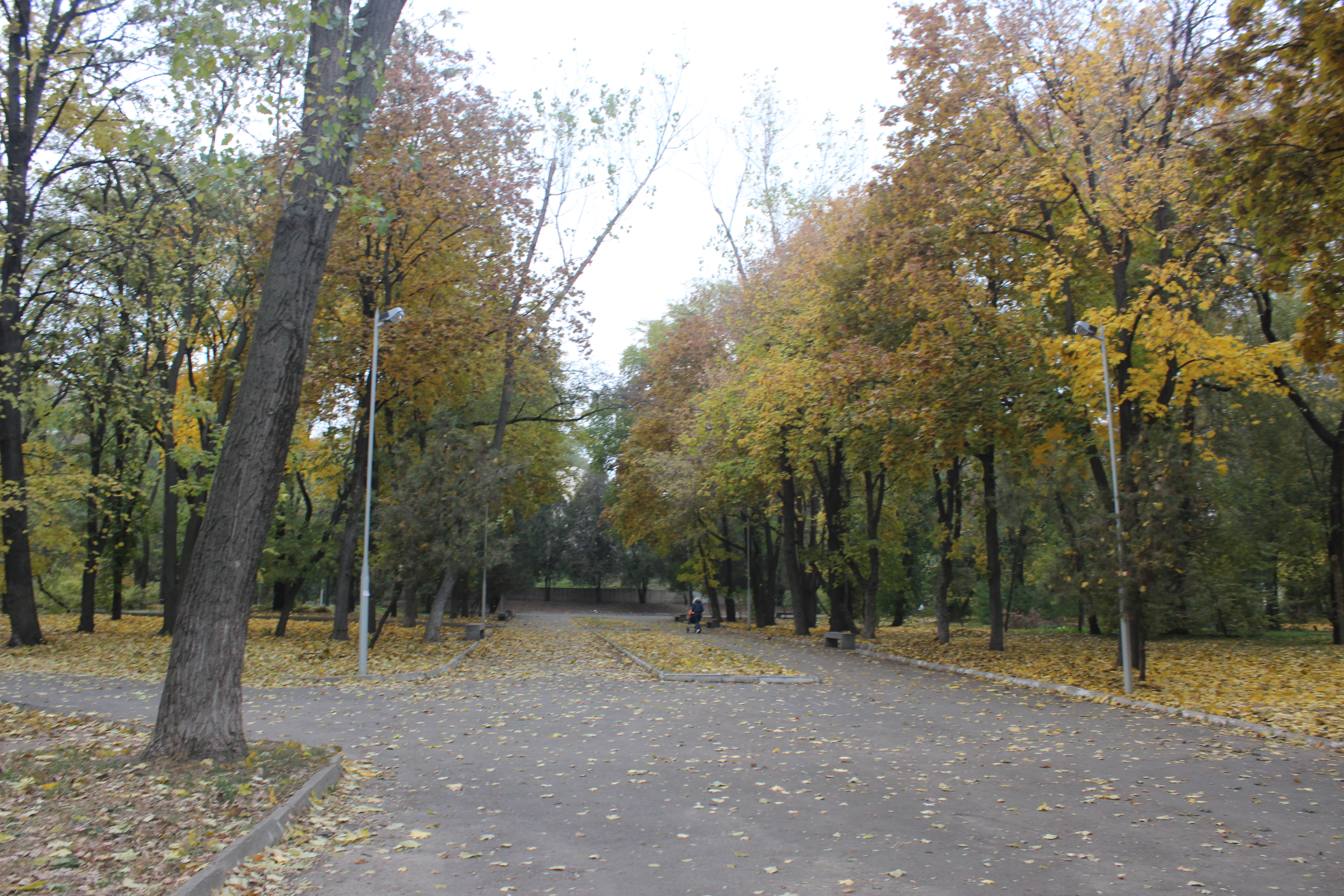
One of the park's alleys in 2015

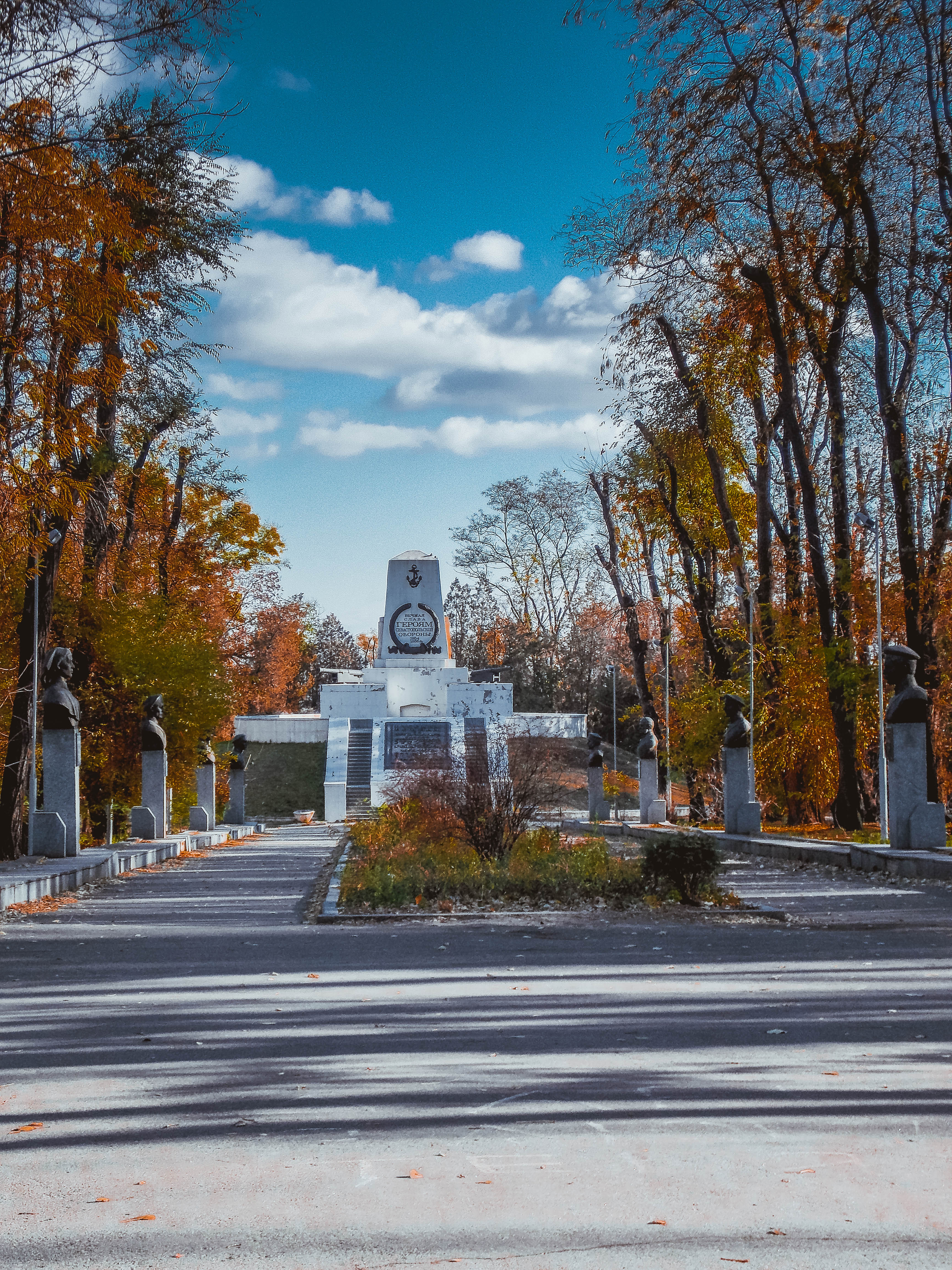
The park's main alley with busts and monument in 2015

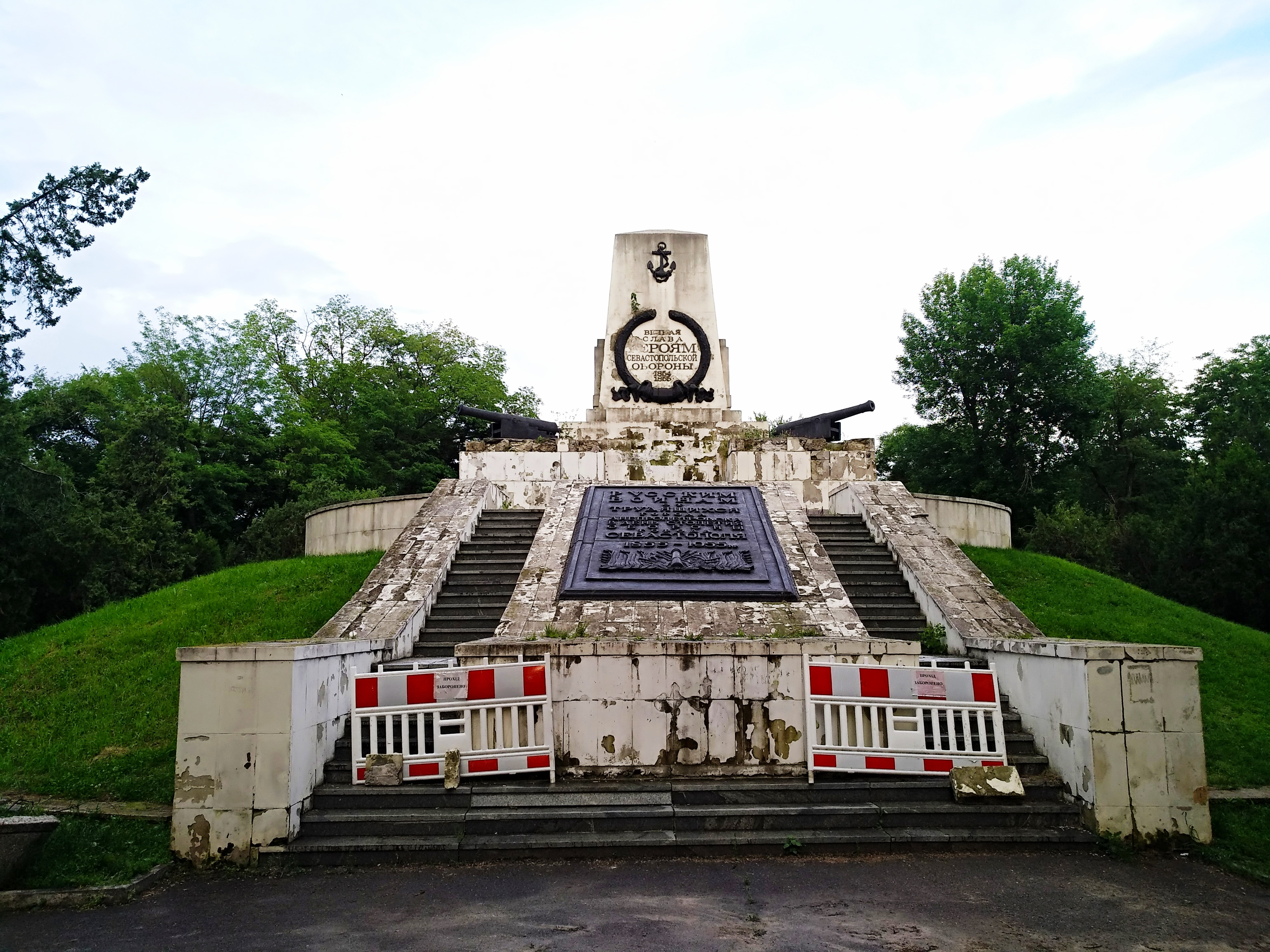
The monument in 2021
