= Medal "For Battle Merit" =

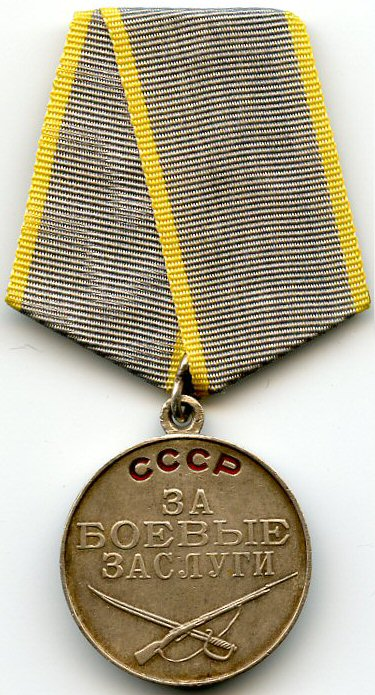
- Medal "For Battle Merit" and its ribbon (obverse)
- Type: Military medal
- Awarded for: "Combat action resulting in a military success, courageous defense of the state borders, or successful military and political training and preparation"
- Country: Soviet Union
- Presented by: USSR
- Eligibility: Citizens of the Soviet Union
- Status: No longer awarded
- Established: October 17, 1938
- Final award: 1 January 1995

Highlights
- Total: 5,210,000
- Ribbon of the Medal "For Battle Merit"

Precedence
- Next (higher): Medal of Ushakov
- Next (lower): Medal of Nakhimov

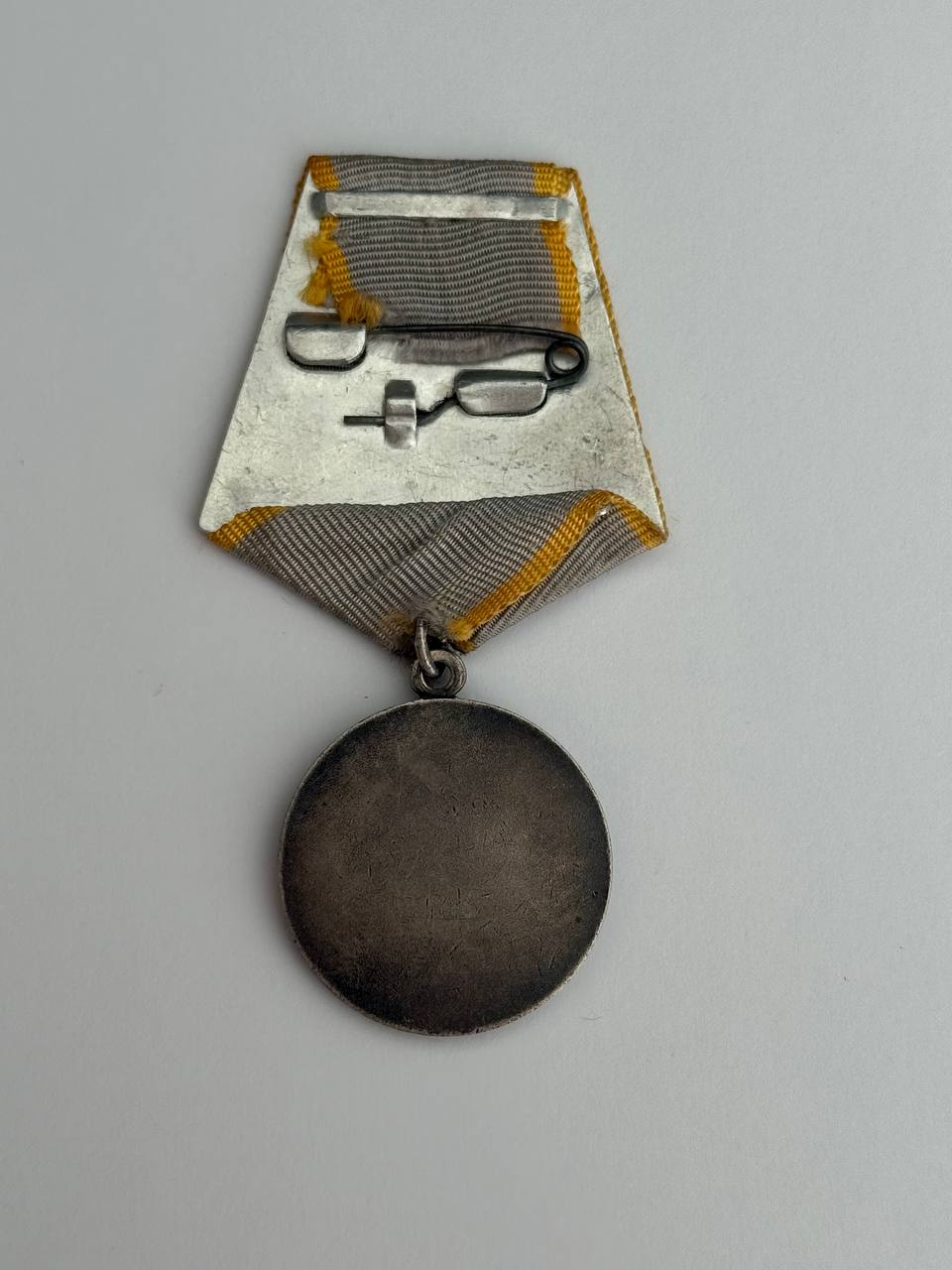
Medal "For Battle Merit" reverse

The Medal "For Battle Merit" (Russian: Медаль «За боевые заслуги») was a Soviet military medal awarded for "combat action resulting in a military success", "courageous defense of the state borders", or "successful military and political training and preparation".

It was created on October 17, 1938 by the decision of the Presidium of the Supreme Soviet of the Soviet Union. Like the Medal "For Courage", its status was revised to prevent the medal from being given for years of service (a practice that was rampant in the USSR) rather than actual bravery during a battle. More than 5,210,000 medals were awarded between 1938 and 1991.
