= Vladimir Istomin =

Russian admiral (1810–1855)

Vladimir Ivanovich Istomin
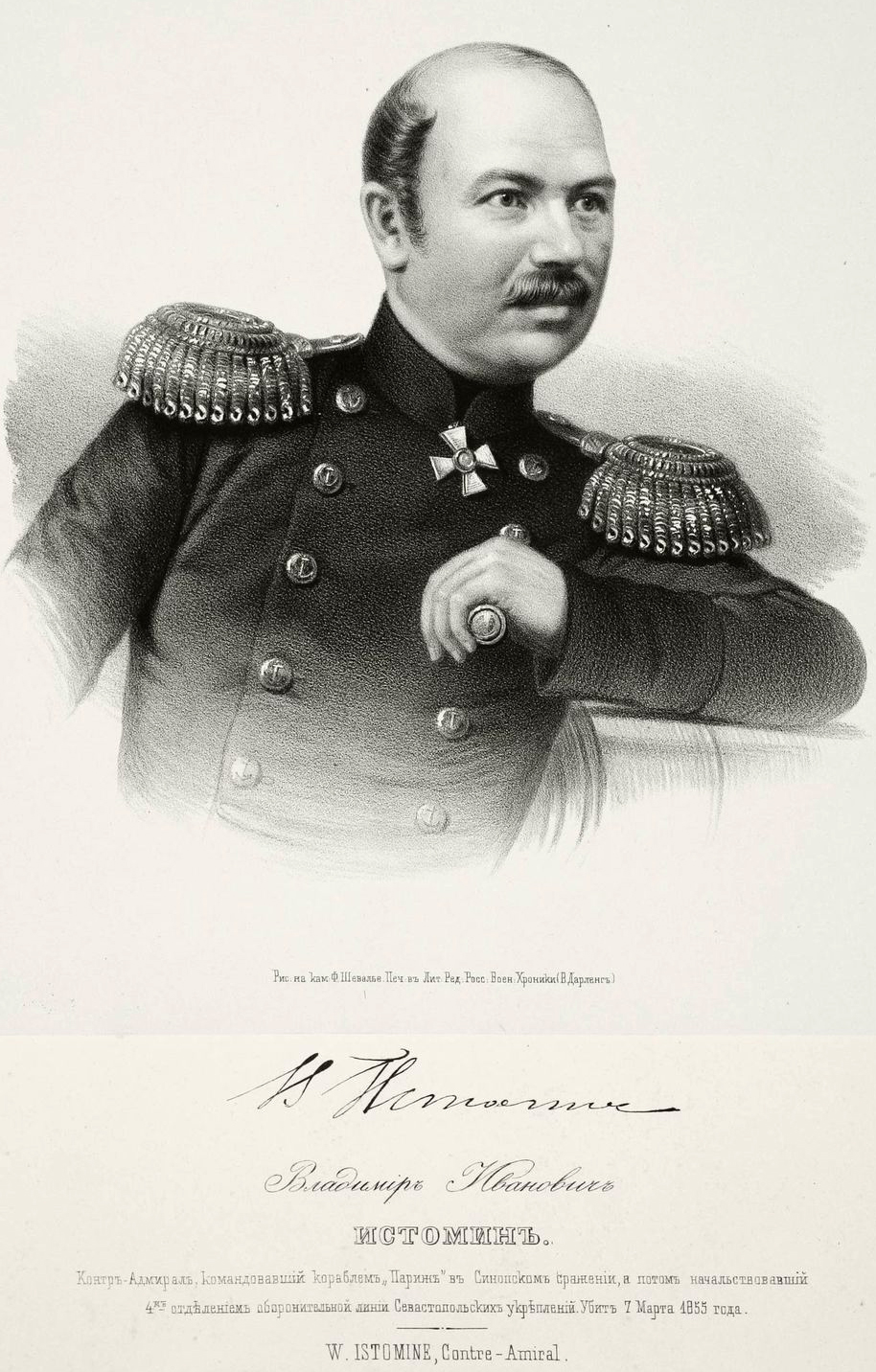
- Born: 9 February 1810; Russian Empire
- Died: 7 March 1855 (aged 45); Sevastopol, Russian Empire
- Burial place: Admirals' Burial Vault, Sevastopol, Crimea
- Military career
- Allegiance: Russian Empire
- Branch: Imperial Russian Navy
- Service years: 1823–1855
- Rank: Rear admiral
- Conflicts: Greek War of Independence; Battle of Navarino; Crimean War; Battle of Sinop; Siege of Sevastopol †
- Awards: Order of St. George; Order of St. Vladimir; Order of Saint Anna; Order of St. Stanislaus

Vladimir Ivanovich Istomin (Russian: Владимир Иванович Истомин; 21 February [O.S. 9 February] 1810 – 19 March [O.S. 7 March] 1855) was a Russian rear admiral (1853) and hero of the Siege of Sevastopol.

== Biography ==
In 1827, Vladimir Istomin graduated from the Naval College. That same year, he then took part in the Battle of Navarino and later in the blockade of the Dardanelles (1828-1829). In 1836, Istomin was transferred from the Baltic Fleet to the Black Sea Fleet. In 1850, he was appointed commander of the ship of the line Parizh (Париж), which would participate in the Battle of Sinop in 1853.

During the Siege of Sevastopol, Vladimir Istomin was in charge of the defense of the Malakhov Mound (Малахов курган) and nearby redoubts, setting an example of bravery and tenacity. He was killed by a cannonball on the Kamchatka redoubt on March 7, 1855. Istomin was buried in the Admirals' Burial Vault in Sevastopol.

== Legacy ==
A bust portraying Russian admirals and sailors from the Crimean War, including Vladimir Istomin, was erected at Sevastopol Park in Dnipro (Ukraine) after renovations in 2008. It and the other busts were removed in December 2021.
