= Battle of Sinop =

1853 naval battle of the Crimean War

- Part of the Crimean War
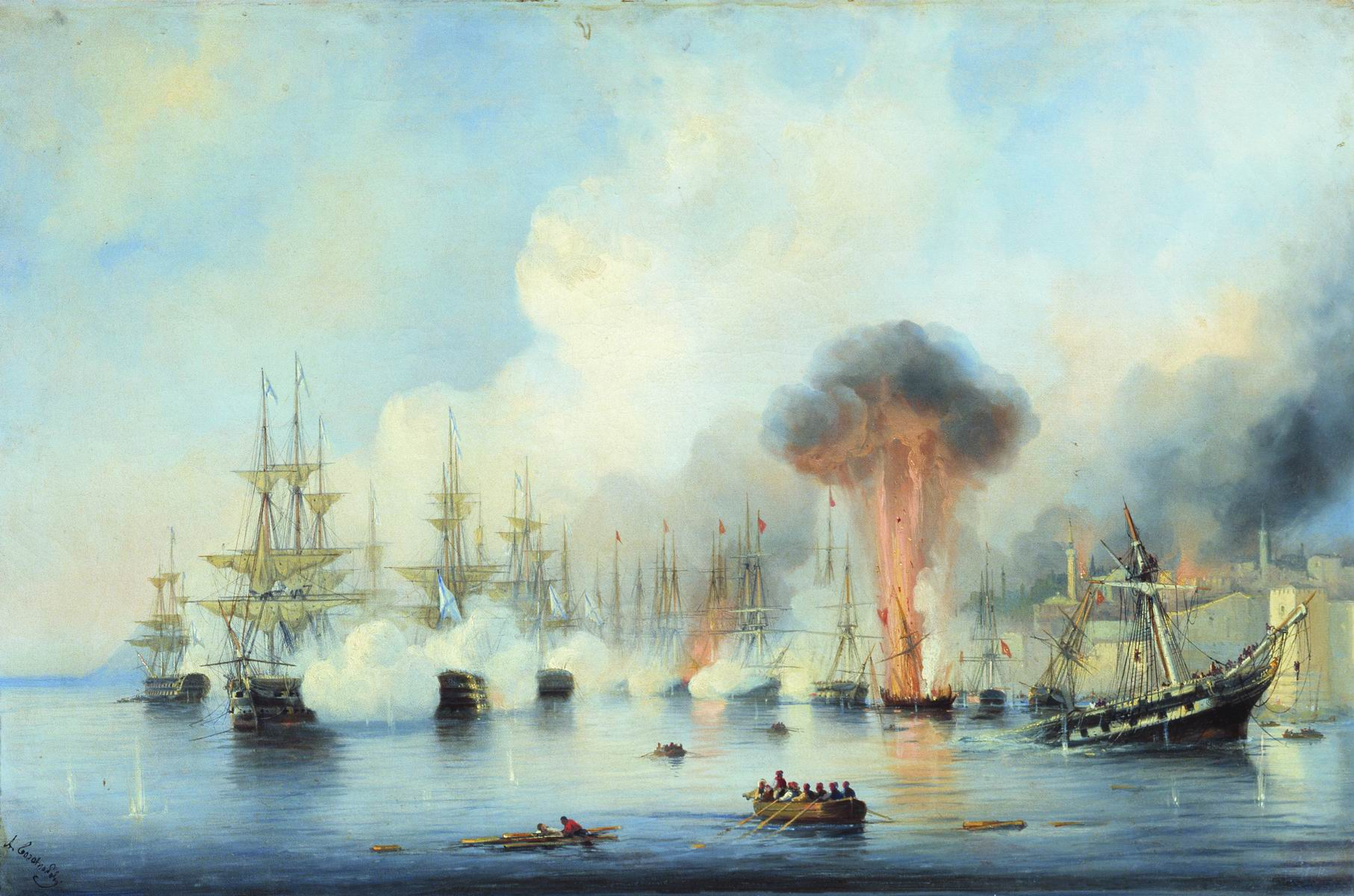
- The Battle of Sinop by Alexey Bogolyubov
Date	30 November 1853 (18 November O.S.)
Location	Sinop, Ottoman Empire 42.02°N 35.15°E
Result	Russian victory: France and Britain enter the Crimean War

Belligerents
(Russia) Russian Empire	Ottoman Empire: Egypt Eyalet

Commanders and leaders
(Russian Empire) Pavel Nakhimov	Osman Pasha (POW); Adolphus Slade

Strength
6 ships of the line, 2 frigates, 3 steamers	7 frigates, 3 corvettes, 2 steamers, coastal artillery

Casualties and losses
37 killed, 229 wounded	3,000–5,000 killed 1 frigate sunk, 1 steamer sunk, 6 frigates grounded, 3 corvettes grounded, ~2 shore batteries destroyed
- Location within Black Sea

The Battle of Sinop, or the Battle of Sinope, was a naval battle that took place on 30 November 1853 between Imperial Russia and the Ottoman Empire during the opening phase of the Crimean War (1853–1856). It took place at Sinop, a sea port on the southern shore of the Black Sea (the northern shore of Anatolian Turkey). A Russian squadron attacked and decisively defeated an Ottoman squadron anchored in Sinop's harbor. The Russian force consisted of six ships of the line, two frigates and three armed steamers, led by Admiral Pavel Nakhimov; the Ottoman defenders were seven frigates, three corvettes and two armed steamers, commanded by Vice Admiral Osman Pasha.

The Russian navy had recently adopted naval artillery that fired explosive shells, which gave them a decisive advantage in the battle. All the Ottoman frigates and corvettes were either sunk or forced to run aground to avoid destruction; only one steamer escaped. The Russians lost no ships. Nearly 3,000 Turks were killed when Nakhimov's forces fired on the town after the battle. The victory is commemorated in Russia as one of the Days of Military Honour.

The one-sided battle contributed to the decision of France and Britain to enter the war, on the side of the Ottomans. The battle demonstrated the effectiveness of explosive shells against wooden hulls, and the superiority of shells over cannonballs. It led to widespread adoption of explosive naval artillery and indirectly to the development of ironclad warships.

== Prelude ==
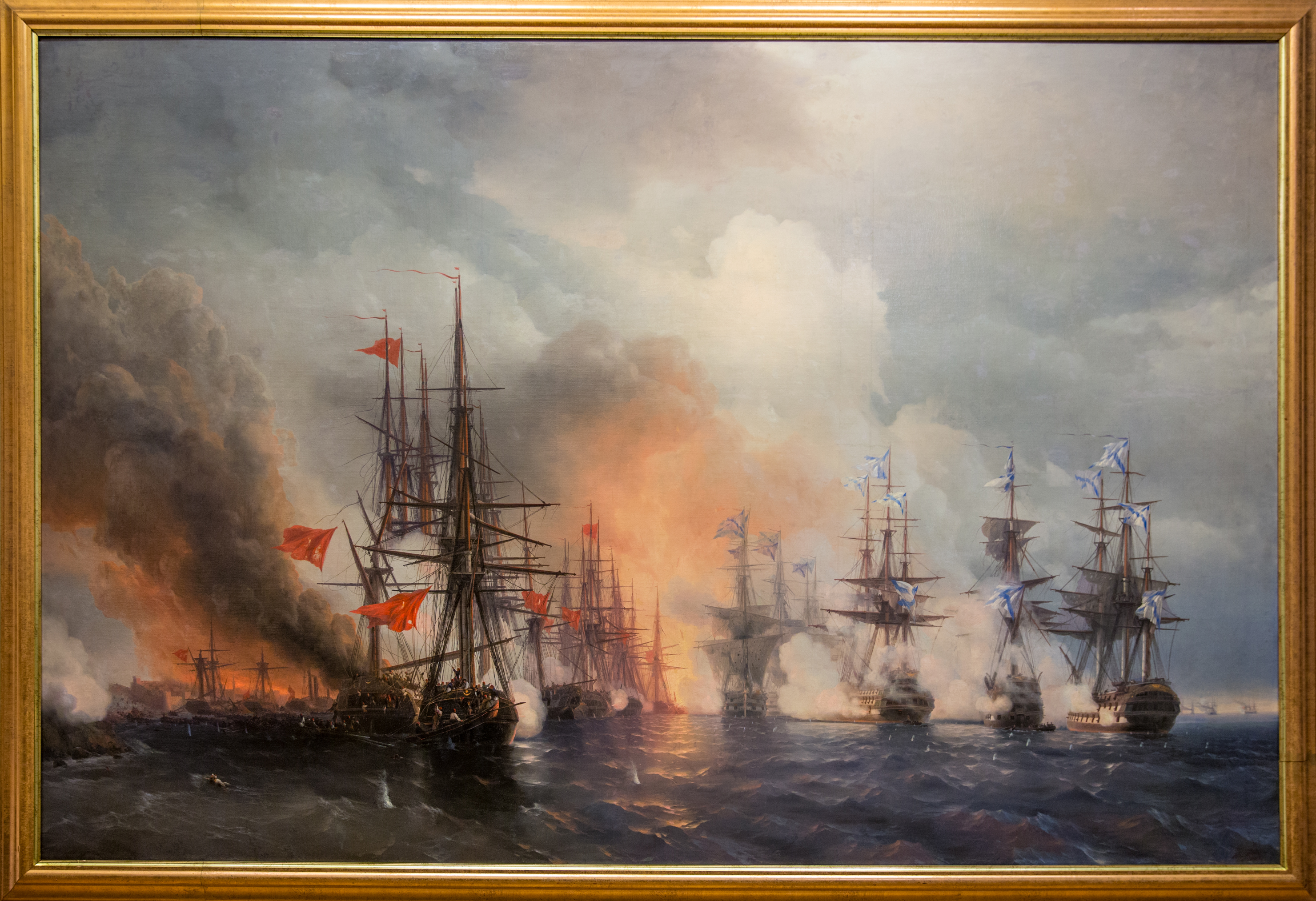
Russian ships at the Battle of Sinop, painting by Ivan Aivazovsky.

On 4 October 1853, around 2 months before the battle, in response to the Russian occupation of Moldavia and Wallachia (then part of the Ottoman Danube), the Ottoman Empire declared war on Russia. By the early 1850s the Ottoman Empire was deeply in debt and relied exclusively on British and French loans as a means of support. As a result, Ottoman leaders had no choice but to agree to drastic reductions in both army and navy force levels. Tsar Nicholas I saw the reductions as an opportunity to press Russian claims in the Trans-Caucasus and along the Danube River. In July 1853 Russian forces occupied several Ottoman principalities and forts along the Danube. Mediation of the disputes broke down, and Ottoman Sultan Abdulmecid I responded with a declaration of war. Fearing Russian expansion, the United Kingdom and France issued a concurrent ultimatum: Russia was to fight only defensively. As long as Russia stayed on the defensive the Anglo-French would remain neutral, but if Russia acted "aggressively" the western powers reserved the right to get involved.

Hostilities began officially on 4 October, with a principal theater in Europe and another in the Caucasus. Sultan Abdulmecid ordered an immediate offensive to drive back the Russians and demonstrate Ottoman might before Ottoman finances totally collapsed. The offensive along the Danube met with mixed success, but the Ottoman land attack into the Russian Caucasus was relatively successful. By the end of October, the Russian Caucasus Corps was in danger of being surrounded. Turkish ships trafficking gunpowder to the Circassians were in contravention of the Straits Convention, which international law was sworn to uphold. The Russians told the Austrian Consul that they were legitimately entitled to seek redress for this act of piracy. Furthermore Russia claimed that two Customs House men had been murdered at Tiflis. The tsar needed no further incentive to react.

Despite the Ottoman declaration of war, the naval aspect was mostly uneventful until November, when the Vice Admiral Osman Pasha was forced to dock at Sinop during a storm on the Black Sea. To support the attack and properly supply his forces before significant snowfall, Sultan Abdulmecid ordered a squadron of frigates, steamers and transports to establish a supply corridor to the Ottoman army in Georgia. Osman Pasha, himself aboard the 60-gun Avni Illah, had been sailing with seven frigates, two corvettes and several transports to resupply the Turkish land forces.

Unable to interdict the convoy, Russian naval elements remained in Sevastopol. Abdulmecid ordered a second convoy commanded by Osman Pasha, but by this time it was late November and the fleet was forced to seek winter quarters. It ended up at Sinop, joining the frigate Kaid Zafer which had been part of an earlier patrol, and was joined by the steam frigate Taif from a smaller squadron. The Ottomans had wanted to send ships of the line to Sinop, but the British ambassador in Constantinople, Viscount Stratford de Redcliffe, had objected to this plan, and only frigates were sent.

Initial Ottoman activity in the Black Sea had been allowed to proceed unhindered, but as the situation of the Russian Caucasus Corps deteriorated, St. Petersburg was forced to act. Adm. Pavel Nakhimov was ordered to muster the Russian navy and interdict the Ottomans. From 1–23 November Russian squadrons were dispatched into the Black Sea to establish control. Two Ottoman steamers, the Medzhir Tadzhiret and the Pervaz Bahri, were captured by the Russians in short engagements. Russia was able to establish operational control of the sea lanes but storms forced Nakhimov to send back most of his force for repair. Left with only a frigate, a steamer and three ships of the line, Nakhimov continued the search for Osman and the convoy. On 23 November, Osman's flag was sighted returning and then entering the harbor at Sinop. Nakhimov immediately deployed his ships to blockade the harbor and sent his only frigate to retrieve as many reinforcements as could be found.

On 30 November, Vice Admiral Fyodor Novosilski rallied six more ships to Nakhimov, completing the blockade force in a loose semi-circle. Additional steamers were expected, but Nakhimov decided to act before the Ottomans could be reinforced by additional ships. For his part, Osman had been well aware of the Russian presence since 23 November, but felt his ships were safe in harbor. Sinop had substantial harbor defenses and forts with interlocking fields of fire and ample cannon. Osman did little to break the weak Russian blockade, even allowing many of his crews to disembark.

== Battle ==
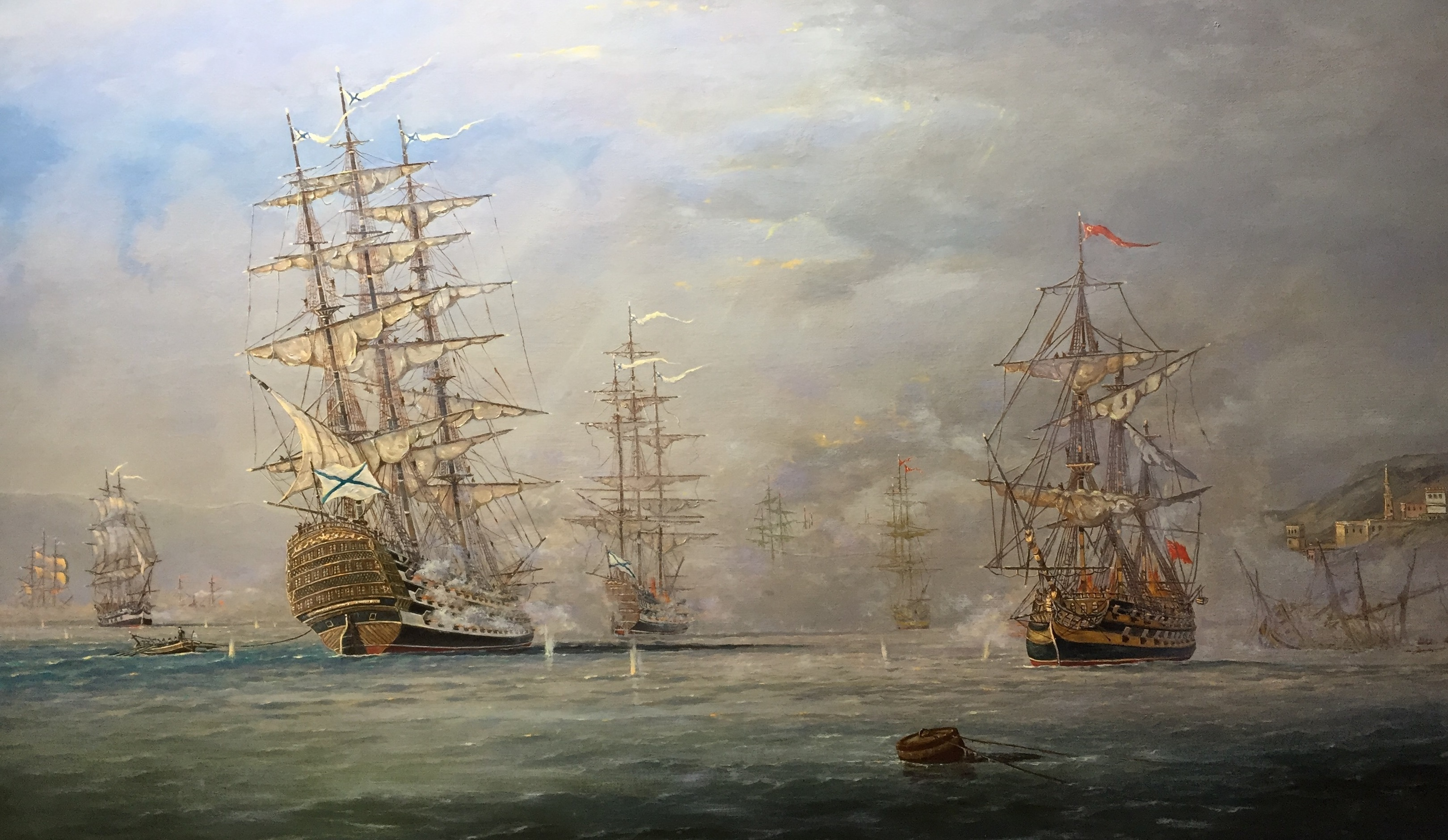
The Battle of Sinop, Vladimir Kosov (2020).

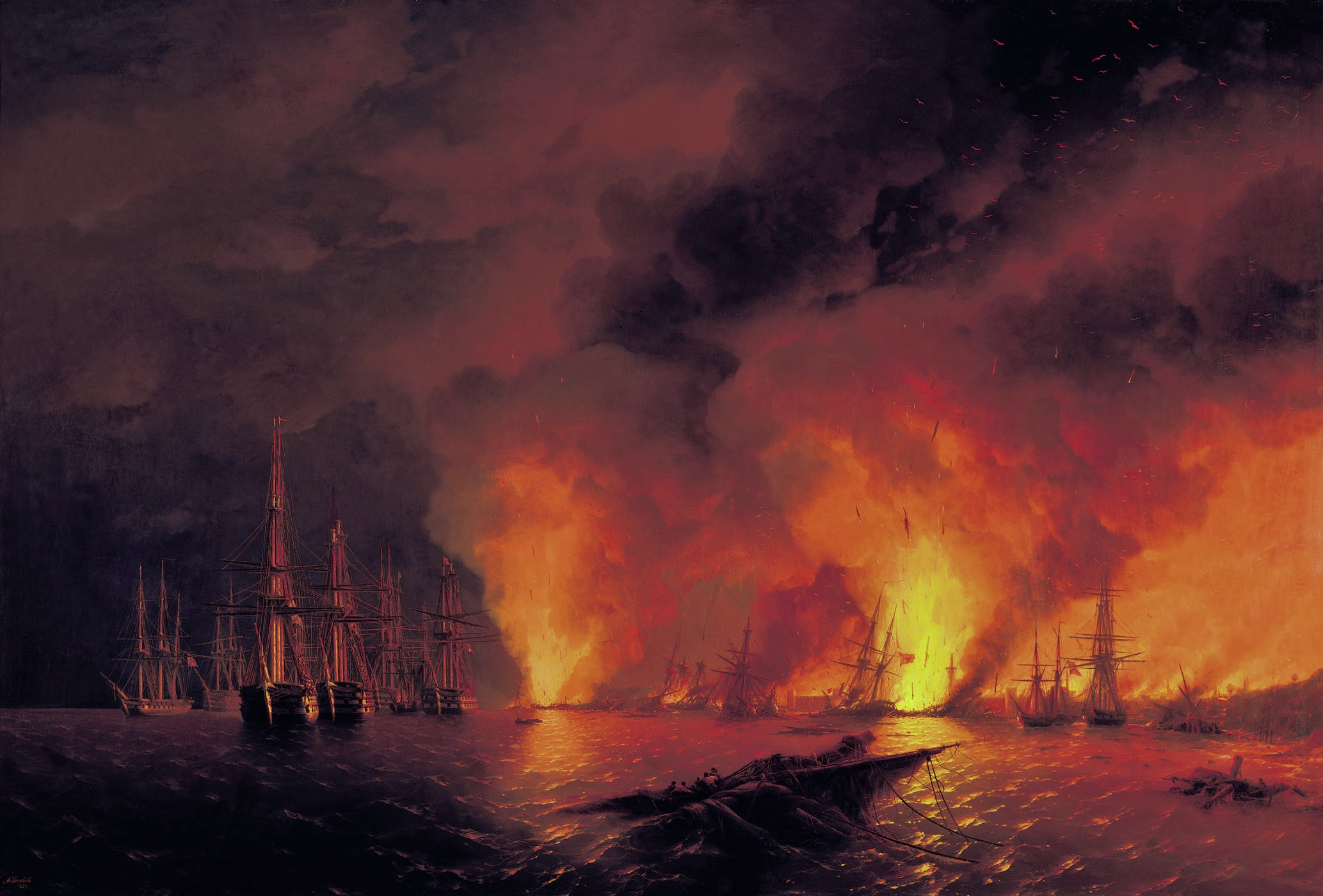
The Battle of Sinop, Ivan Aivazovsky

Three Russian second-rate ships of the line (84 cannons each) led by Admiral Nakhimov arrived at Sinop on 23 November to discover the Turkish fleet in the harbor under the defence of the on-shore fortifications strengthened by cannons. Six Russian warships from Sevastopol under command of Vice Admiral Fyodor Novosilsky (including three 120-cannon first-rate ships of the line) joined Nakhimov on 28 November.

Admiral Nakhimov, was under orders from Alexander Sergeyevich Menshikov to destroy any Turkish ships carrying supplies to the Caucasus. His squadron included six modern battleships, two frigates, and three streamers, with the heavier Paixhans guns armed with explosive shells, their first use in a sea battle.

The Ottoman forces included seven frigates, three corvettes and two armed steamers. The Russians planned to deploy their ships in two columns that would advance to within close range of the enemy vessels before dropping anchor and opening fire. Under Nakhimov's command, the 84-gun ship Imperatritsa Maria was the first to engage when she fired on the 44-gun Ottoman flagship Auni Allah.

On 30 November the Russian squadron entered the harbor from the northwest in a triangular formation. Nakhimov maneuvered his fleet so that the Ottoman vessels were between the Russian ships and Sinop's harbor defenses, shielding his own force and exposing the Ottomans to potential friendly fire. Nakhimov spaced his battleships evenly in two lines, covering the entire harbor with interlocking fields of fire. Russian gunners began to score hits on all the Ottoman targets. The projectile shells fired for the first time from Russian guns immediately set the wooden Ottoman ships on fire. Panic-stricken sailors found firefighting efforts difficult amidst continued fire and almost constant shrapnel. After about 30 minutes of combat the Ottoman flag frigate Auni Allah was shot full of holes and ran aground when her anchor cable was cut. Imperatritsa Maria then attacked and disabled the 44-gun frigate Fazli Allah, which caught fire. Meanwhile, the other Russian ships damaged the Nizamie and Damiad. The Ottoman corvette Guli Sephid and frigate Navek Bakhri exploded.

Only one Ottoman vessel, the 12-gun paddle frigate Taif, managed to escape the battle while all the others were either sunk or purposely run ashore to prevent sinking. She fled to Istanbul and arrived on 2 December, informing the Ottoman government and Admiral Stratford of the Royal Navy of the defeat at Sinop. Once the enemy fleet was destroyed the Russians engaged Ottoman shore batteries and destroyed them. During the fighting 37 Russians were killed and 229 were wounded, and at least three of the ships of the line were damaged.

Ottoman casualties included 2700 sailors killed of the 4200 present, while Sinop endured six days of bombardment.

== Aftermath ==
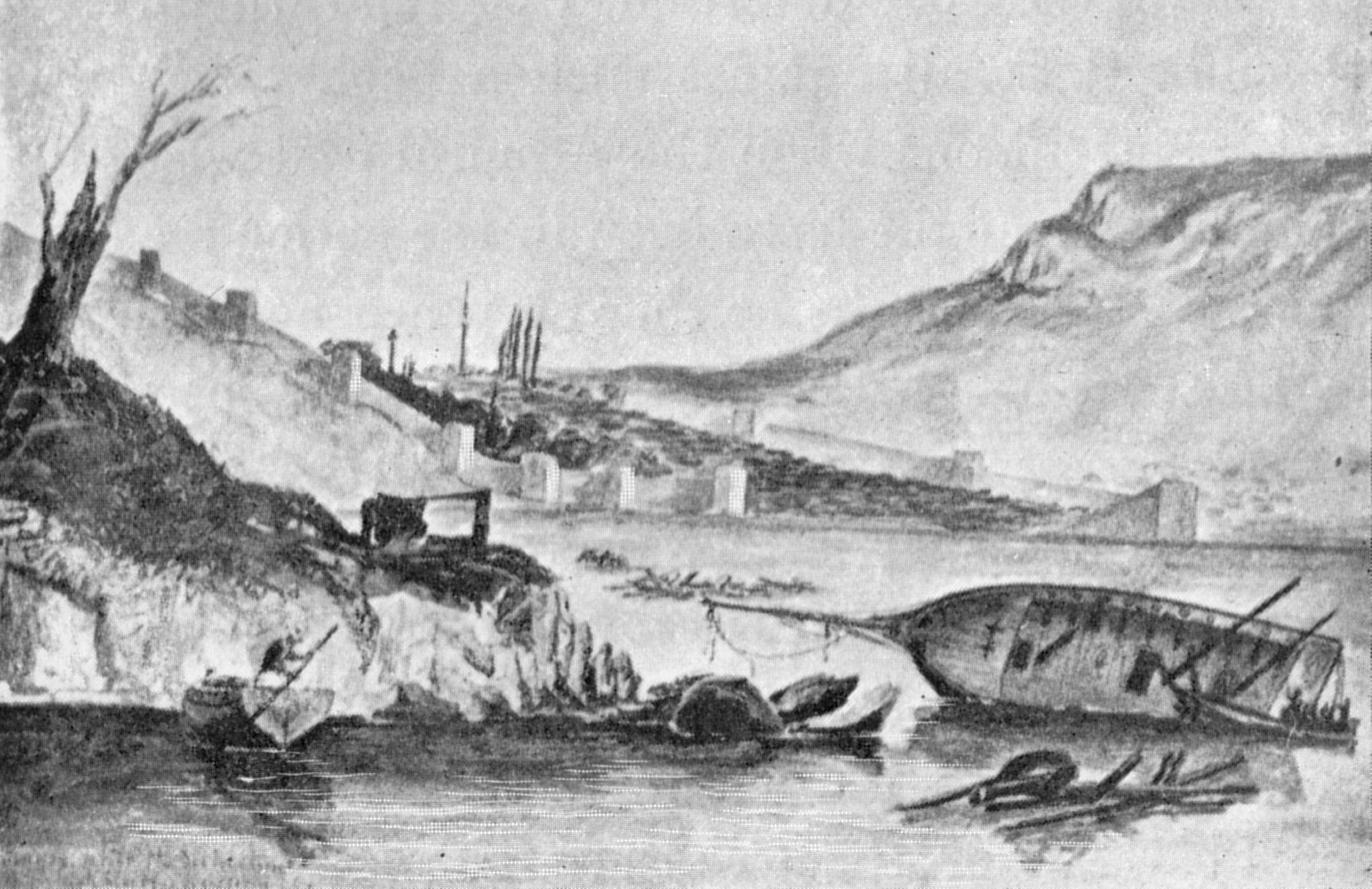
Drawing of Sinop by George Tryon on board HMS Vengeance, which visited the scene of the battle in January 1854

When telegraph reports of the battle reached Russian authorities in St. Petersburg, the reaction was jubilant. The untested and widely hated Russian navy had proven victorious and the recent expenditure in its development seemed warranted. Several balls were held to celebrate the victory and a state-funded parade was held. The affair was rather grand, and included dancers, bands, parading troops who had not taken part in the battle and criminals dressed up in Ottoman uniforms. Military advisors saw the battle as a turning point and pushed for shell-firing guns to be installed on all Russian ships.

The reaction in the Ottoman capital of Constantinople ranged from concern to total panic. Russia had annihilated a vital convoy and now had operational control over the Black Sea. The destruction of the harbor defenses opened the door to Russian invasion and suddenly the entire Samsun and Trabzon Coast was now at risk. Moreover, the Russian violation of the British/French mandate for the war meant that the actions of Russia could no longer be predicted and Russia might not be fighting with one hand tied behind its back.

According to Orlando Figes, the defeat led to diplomatic efforts by the Sublime Porte, with Mustafa Reşid Pasha making, "one last effort to involve the Western powers in a settlement was needed if they were to be won over to the Turkish side in the event of a general war." On 22 December, the French and British agreed a combined Black Sea fleet would ensure protection of Turkish shipping.

"She [Turkey] hears from all sides that the occupation of the Principalities by Russia constitutes a cause of war; and she has not only put herself into a state of respectable defence, but she has appealed with perfect success to the zeal of her Mussulmen and to the loyalty of her Christian subjects."

The attack was treated by external powers as unjustified and caused a wave of anti-Russian sentiment in western Europe. Much of the British press presented the attack as the "Massacre of Sinope". The attack strengthened the pro-war factions in Britain and France, and provided them with the justification for a war to curb Russian bellicosity. Lord Palmerston temporarily resigned over the affair. By March 1854, however, war hawks in the National Government won out and Sinop was seen as a just cause for war, although ultimately the real motivation was to curb Russian expansion in accordance with a balance of power strategy. "Turkey must be defended from aggression.... It may be regarded as an intentional insult to the maritime powers...these ships were charged with provisions for Batoum and they have been destroyed in a Turkish harbour - which is Turkish territory - which England is bound to protect."

== Importance to naval warfare ==
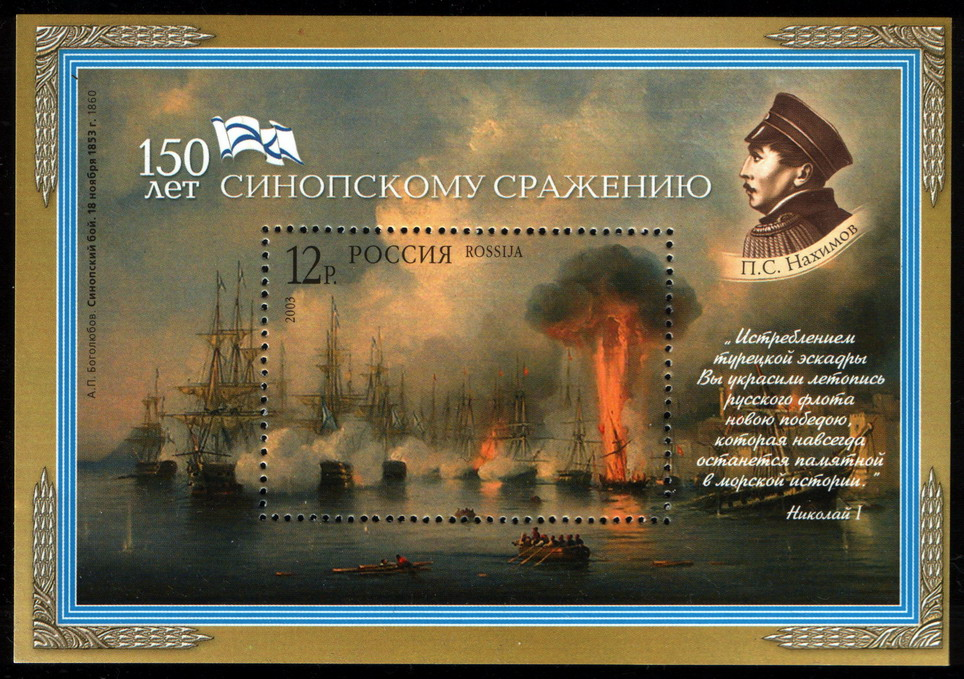
Russian stamp, Battle of Sinop, 2003 Michel No. 1128, Scott No. 6800

Sinop was presented by the media as not so much a battle but an ambush, but its results were nonetheless important to the practice of 19th-century warfare and the evolution of naval doctrine. Prior to Sinop the standard naval armament was the smooth-bore that fired cannonballs, shot, shrapnel, and other projectiles. Paixhans guns or regional equivalents were slowly being integrated into navies, but only the French, Russian and American navies had made a comprehensive effort. These batteries represented a clear evolution in naval technology that broke through the final ceiling of the Age of Sail. Unlike previous smooth-bore ordnance, Paixhans guns fired explosive shells and not mere metal projectiles. The shells themselves did both kinetic and explosive damage, causing fires. In addition, the new guns were heavier, could engage at a greater range, and possessed far greater penetrating power.

However, until 1853 no navy had made comprehensive use of shell-firing guns in a live combat environment. Indeed, many experts disparaged the new weapons and the larger ships required to carry them as too heavy for naval warfare. The results of Sinop were clear and showed that the new weapons were effective. As a result, an arms race ensued with participant nations desperately looking for ways to up-gun existing ships and incorporate the shell-firing guns into new ironclad vessels.

== Order of battle ==
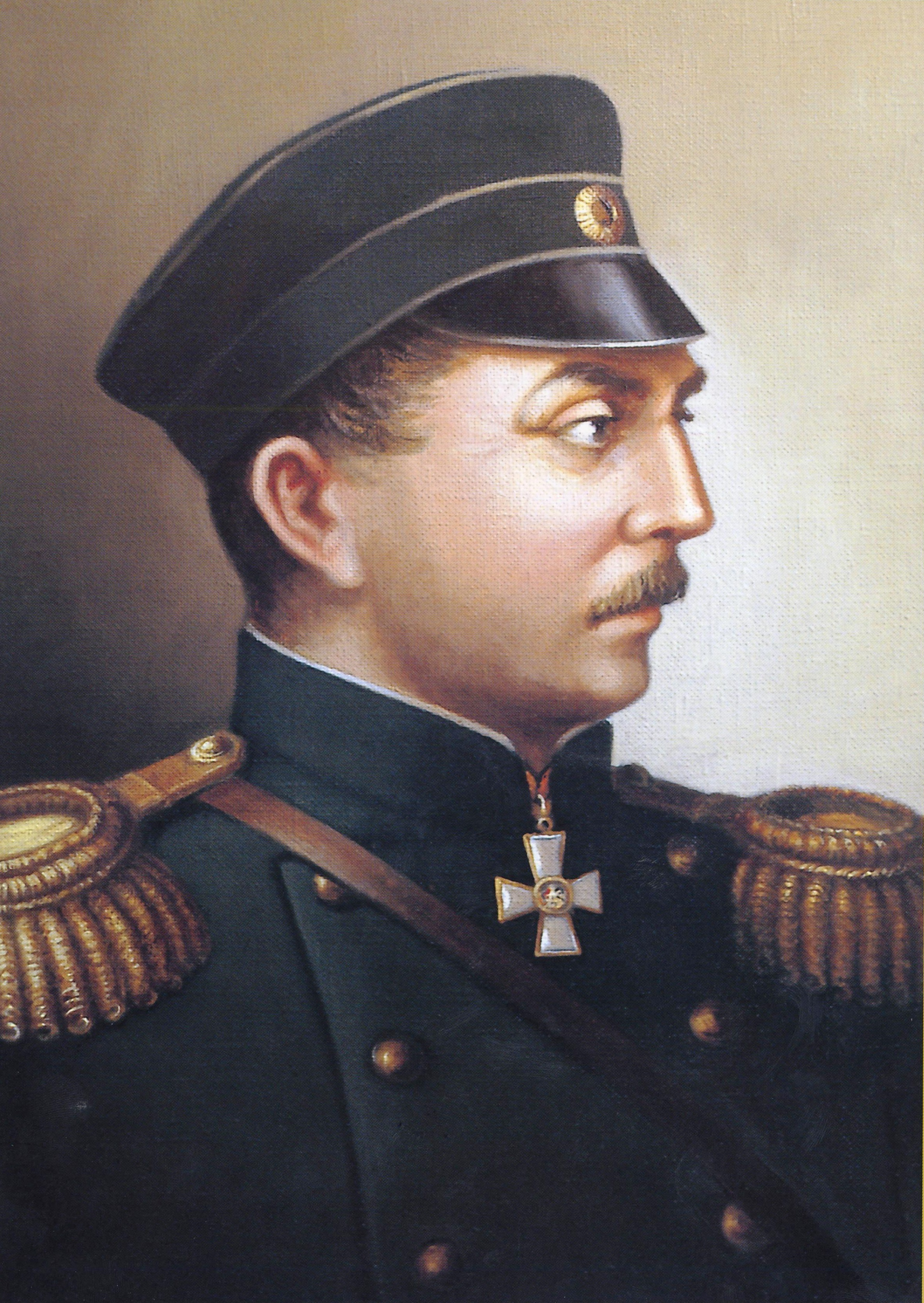
Russian Admiral Pavel Nakhimov Russian commander of Battle of Sinop and the Siege of Sevastopol

=== Russian Empire ===
- Velikiy Knyaz Konstantin, ship of the line, 120 guns
- Tri Sviatitelia, ship of the line, 120 guns
- Parizh, 120 guns, ship of the line, transferred flagship
- Imperatritsa Maria, ship of the line, 84 guns, flagship
- Chesma, ship of the line, 84 guns
- Rostislav, ship of the line, 84 guns
- Kulevchi, frigate, 54 guns
- Kagul, frigate, 44 guns
- Odessa, steamer, 4 guns
- Krym, steamer, 4 guns
- Khersones, steamer, 4 guns

=== Ottoman Empire ===
- Avni Illah, frigate, 44 guns (grounded)
- Fazl Illah, frigate, 44 guns (originally the Russian Rafail, captured during the war of 1828–29) (burned, grounded)
- Nizamieh, frigate, 62 guns (grounded after losing two masts)
- Nessin Zafer, frigate, 60 guns (grounded after her anchor chain broke)
- Navek Bahri, frigate, 58 guns (exploded)
- Damiat, frigate, 56 guns (Egyptian) (grounded)
- Kaid Zafer, frigate, 54 guns (grounded)
- Nejm Fishan, corvette, 24 guns
- Feyz Mabud, corvette, 24 guns (grounded)
- Kel Safid, corvette, 22 guns (exploded)
- Taif, paddle frigate, 30 guns (retreated to Istanbul)
- Erkelye, steamer, 10 guns

== General reference ==
- Baş, Ersan (2007). Çeşme, Navarin, Sinop Raids and Their Consequences. Istanbul: Sea Printing House. ISBN 978-975-409-452-7.
