= Russian ship Navarin =

Two ships of the Imperial Russian Navy have been named Navarin after the Russian victory at the Battle of Navarino in 1827.

- Russian corvette Navarin - 20-gun Egyptian corvette captured in 1828 and sold for scrap in 1854.
- Russian battleship Navarin - Predreadnought battleship sunk by the Japanese during the Battle of Tsushima in 1905.
