= French ship Scipion =

Five ships of the French Navy have borne the name Scipion in honour of Scipio Africanus.

== French ships named Scipion ==
- French ship Scipion (1778), a 74-gun ship of the line, lead ship of her class (1779–1782)
- French ship Scipion (1790), a 74-gun Téméraire-class ship of the line (1790–1793)
- Saint-Esprit, an 80-gun ship of the line renamed Scipion in 1794, lead ship of her class (1766–1795)
- French ship Scipion (1801), a 74-gun Téméraire-class ship of the line ordered in 1798 as Orient, renamed in 1801 and captured by the British in 1805
- French ship Scipion (1813), an 80-gun ship of the line (1813–1846)
Ships of the French Navy named Scipion
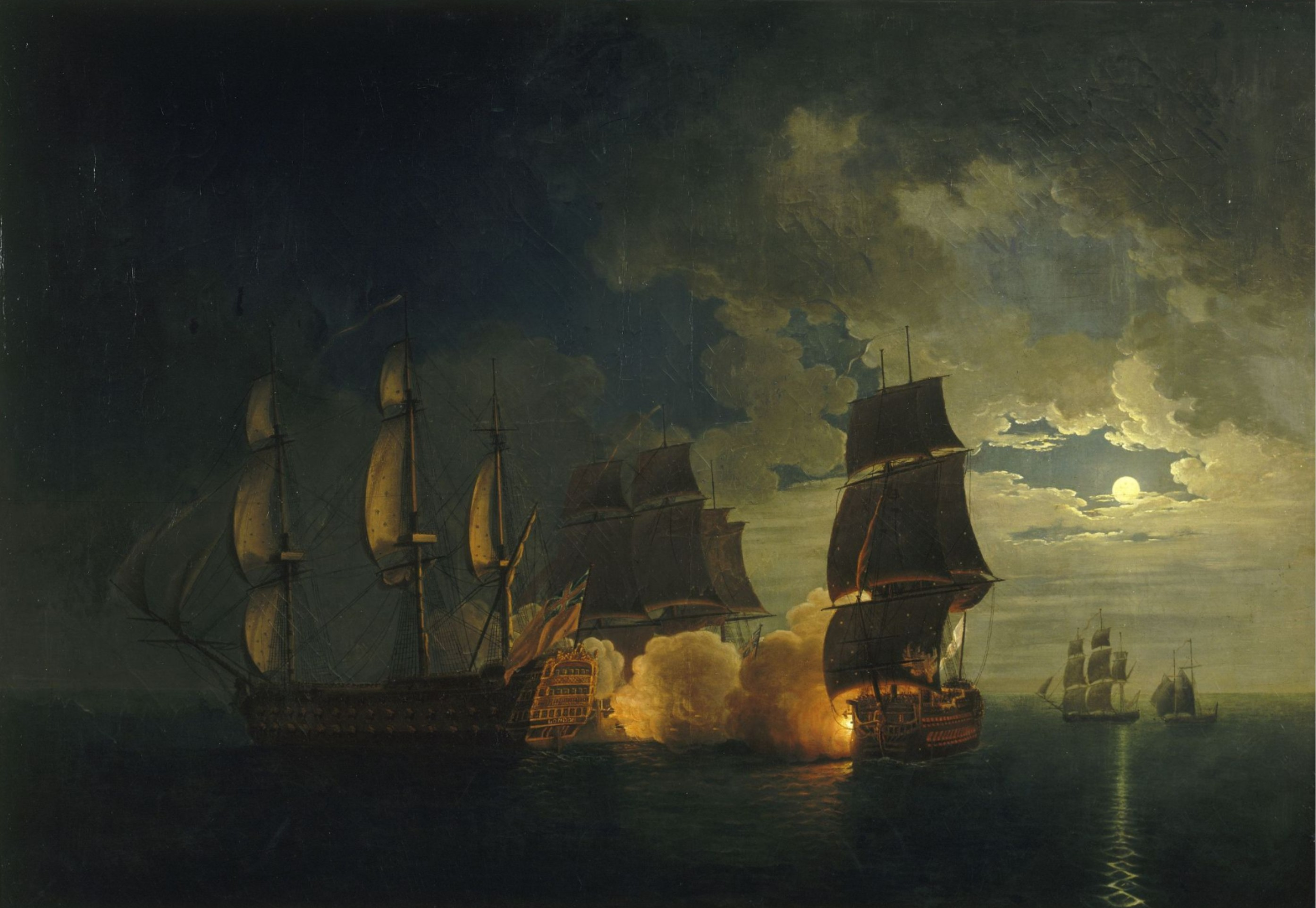
Scipion (1778) (third from right) raking HMS London during the action of 18 October 1782.

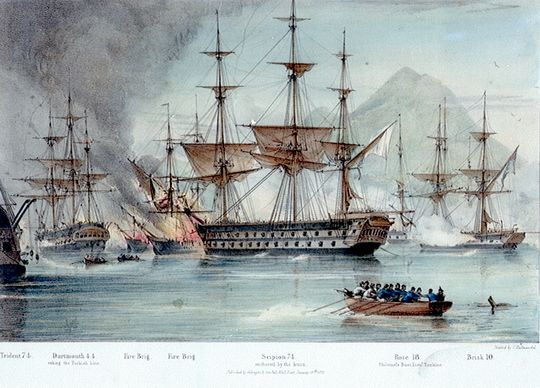
The Battle of Navarino; Scipion (1813) is shown in the centre, entangled with a fireship
