= James Ashley Maude =

Royal Navy officer (1786–1841)

Captain The Honourable James Ashley Maude CB
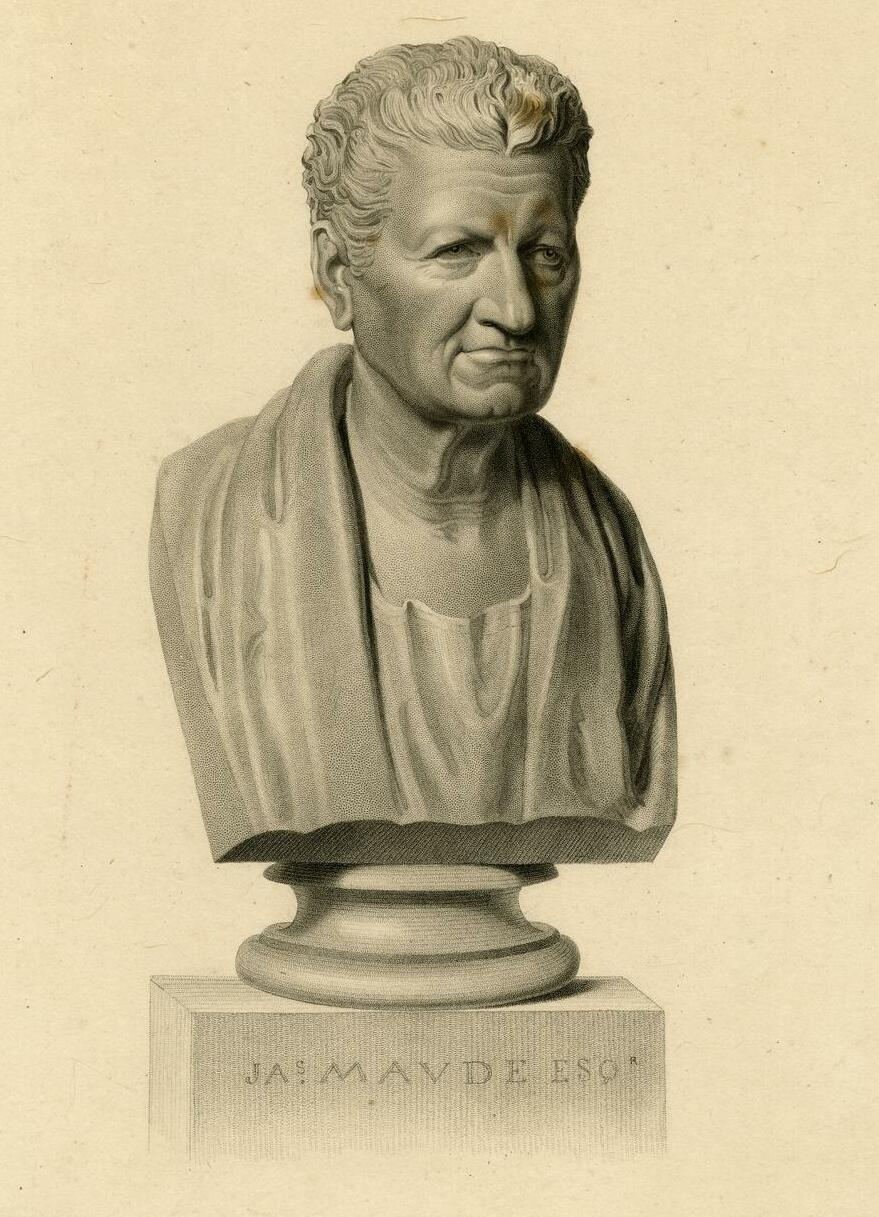
- Born: 1786
- Died: 1841 (aged 54–55)
- Allegiance: Great Britain; United Kingdom
- Service: Royal Navy
- Conflicts: War of the Second Coalition; Siege of Genoa; War of the Third Coalition; Trafalgar campaign; Battle of Cape Ortegal; War of 1812; Greek War of Independence; Battle of Navarino

James Ashley Maude (1786–1841) was an Anglo-Irish officer in the Royal Navy.

== Origins ==
James Ashley Maude was the third son of Cornwallis Maude, 1st Viscount Hawarden, by his third wife, Isabella Elizabeth Stanley, sister to the 1st Viscount Monck. His ancestor, Christopher Maude, a member of the Irish House of Commons, emigrated from Yorkshire, and settled at Dundrum, County Tipperary, about the year 1639.

== Career ==
James Ashley Maude entered the Royal Navy in 1799, as midshipman on board the Barfleur, 98 guns, Captain James Richard Dacres; and shortly afterwards joined the Prince, another second-rate, then bearing the flag of Sir Roger Curtis, and employed in the blockade of Cadiz; but subsequently the flag of Sir Charles Cotton, and attached to the Channel Fleet. He is next mentioned proceeding to join the Queen Charlotte, 110 guns, bearing the flag of Lord Keith, which ship, however, was accidentally destroyed by fire, near the island of Capreja, on 17 March 1800, only two or three days previous to his arrival at Leghorn.

After this escape, Maude followed Lord Keith into the Minotaur, 74 guns; and was present, in that ship, at the blockade and consequent surrender of Genoa, in the summer of 1800. On 3 August 1801, being then in the Phoenix, 36 guns, Captain (afterwards Sir Lawrence W.) Halsted, he also witnessed the capture of a French 40-gun frigate, the Carrere, near Elba; and on 2 September 1802, the destruction of the Bravoure, 46 guns, and re-capture of a British 32-gun frigate, the Success, near Leghorn.

The Phoenix returned home from the Mediterranean in June 1802; and Maude appears to have subsequently served under Captain Lord William Stuart, in the Crescent frigate, on the North Sea and Channel stations. His first appointment as lieutenant was on 28 March 1805, to the Namur, 74 guns, commanded by Captain L. W. Halsted, in which ship he assisted at the capture of a French squadron, consisting of one 80-gun ship and three 74-gun ships, the former bearing the flag of Pierre Dumanoir le Pelley, at Cape Ortegal, on 4 November 1805.

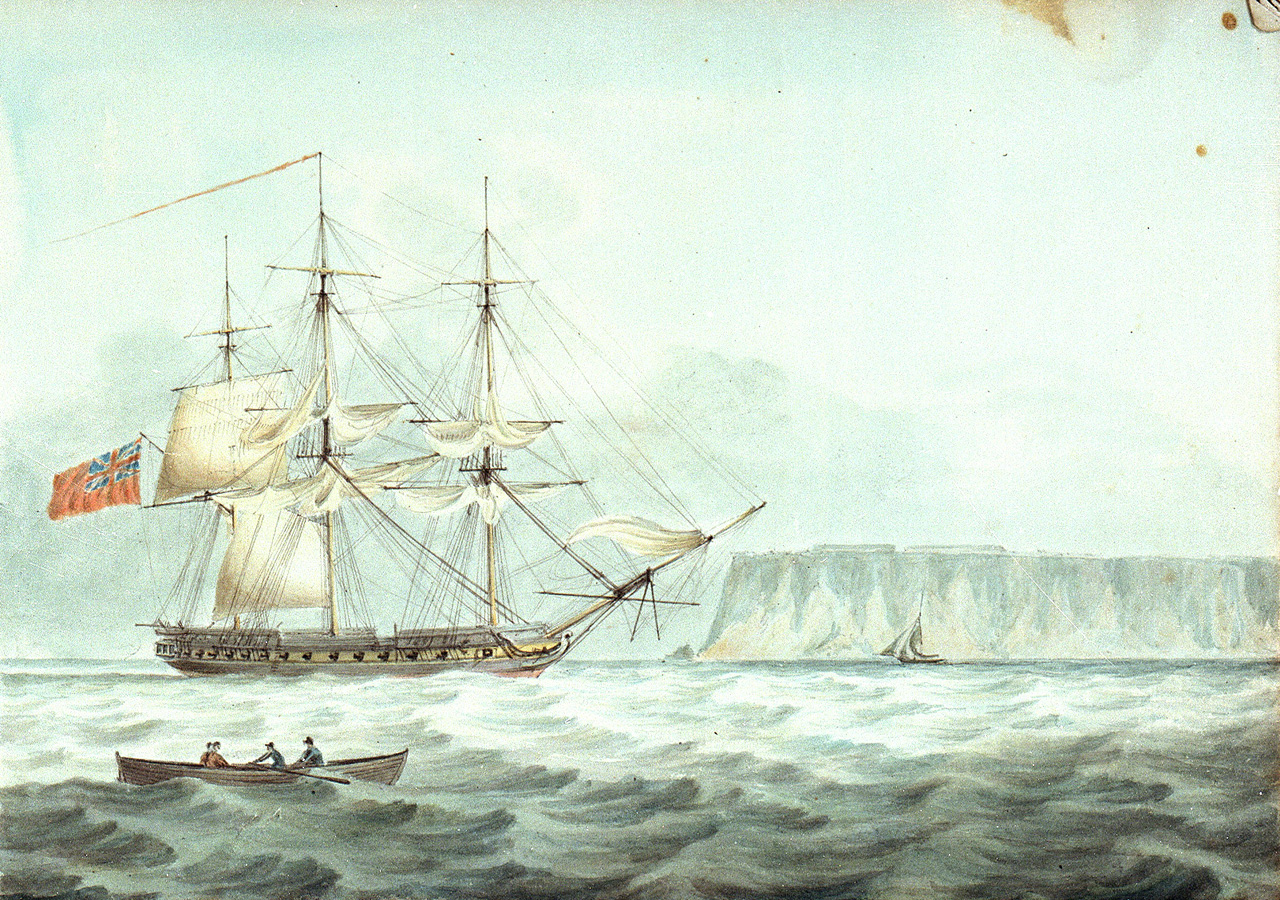
Lavinia off Berry Head, c. 1806

Shortly after this event, Lieutenant Maude was appointed to the Lavinia, 40 guns, in which frigate he continued, under Captains Lord William Stuart and John Hancock, on the Channel, Lisbon, and Mediterranean stations, until January 1809. By Hancock he was frequently employed in boats on the southern coast of France, where he made several successful attacks upon the French trade. His spirited conduct at the capture and destruction of a French convoy in the Bay of Rosas, on 31 October 1809, on which occasion he was slightly wounded, is thus spoken of by Lord Collingwood, to whose flag-ship he had been removed from the Lavinia:

Many officers in the fleet were desirous of being volunteers in this service. I could not resist the earnest request of Lieutenants Lord Viscount Balgonic, the Hon. James Ashley Maude, and the Hon. William Waldegrave, of the Ville de Paris, to have the command of boats, in which they displayed that spirit which is inherent in them.

In November 1809, Lieutenant Maude received an order to act as commander of the Wizard sloop, in which vessel he was first employed, under Captain the Hon. Charles Elphinstone Fleeming, of the Bulwark, 74 guns, in destroying all the batteries between Tarifa and Gibraltar, with the concurrence of the Spanish authorities; and subsequently, in convoying some transports laden with corn, from Sardinia to Cádiz. Whilst performing the latter service, he suffered severely from the effects of fever, and was consequently obliged to invalid. His commission as commander bears date 22 October 1810.

On 15 February 1812, Captain Maude was appointed to the Nemesis, 28 guns, armed en flûte. In this ship, after escorting troops to Lisbon and Catalonia, he convoyed a fleet of transports to North America, where he was very actively employed, under the immediate orders of Rear-Admiral (afterwards Sir George) Cockburn; particularly at the capture of Portsmouth and Ocracoke Island, in North Carolina, on 12 July 1813. In the rear-admiral's official letter, on this occasion, it is stated, that Captain Maude, "with much laudable zeal", attended to render him his personal assistance wherever circumstances might require it.

When on his return from the Halifax station, Captain Maude fell in with the Actæon sloop, and assisted in capturing a French schooner privateer, of 14 guns and 95 men. He paid off the Nemesis, at Plymouth, in March 1814; obtained post rank on 11 March; and was next appointed, on 18 October following, to the Favorite, 26 guns. In the beginning of 1815, he took out the treaty of peace, concluded at Ghent, between Great Britain and America; and on 13 March, only nineteen days after his departure from Washington, he arrived at the Foreign Office with the ratification of the same, by the President and Senate of the United States.

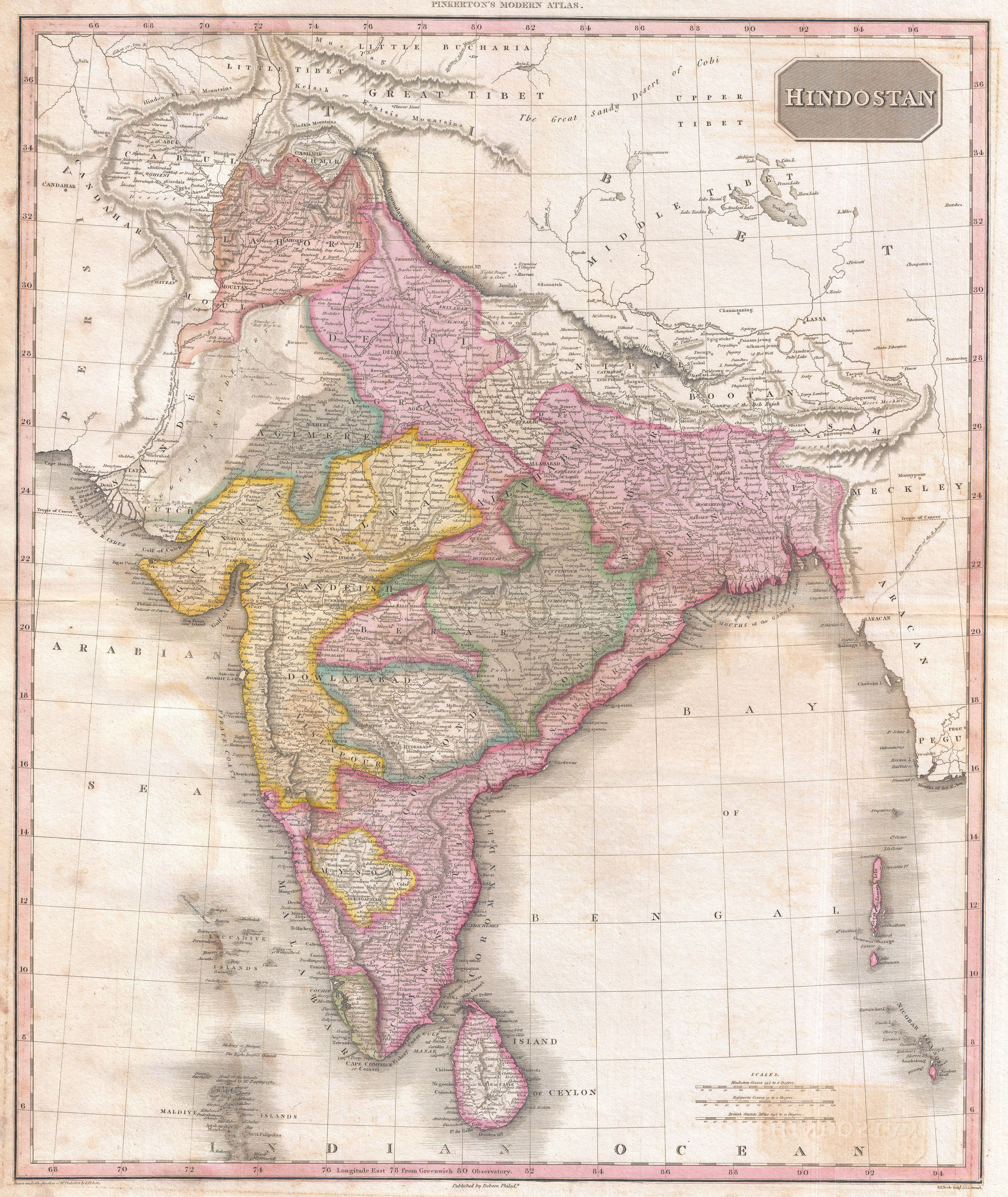
Pinkerton's Hindostan, 1818

After the battle of Waterloo, Captain Maude was despatched to India, with the intelligence of Napoleon's final overthrow; and he appears to have reached Madras on the same day that the overland express arrived there. In July 1816, he discovered several islands on the southern side of the Persian Gulph, previously unknown to European navigators. In June 1817, the Favorite, then at Deptford, and about to be paid off, he commanded a division of boats, under the orders of Captain Andrew King, at the opening of Waterloo Bridge, by King George IV.

Captain Maude's next appointment was on 15 May 1824, to the Dartmouth, 42 guns, fitting out for the Jamaica station; where his boats, under the command of Lieutenant Henry Warde, captured two piratical vessels; one mounting a long 12-pounder on a pivot, and manned with about fifty well armed desperadoes, some of whom were killed, and twelve taken prisoners to Havannah.

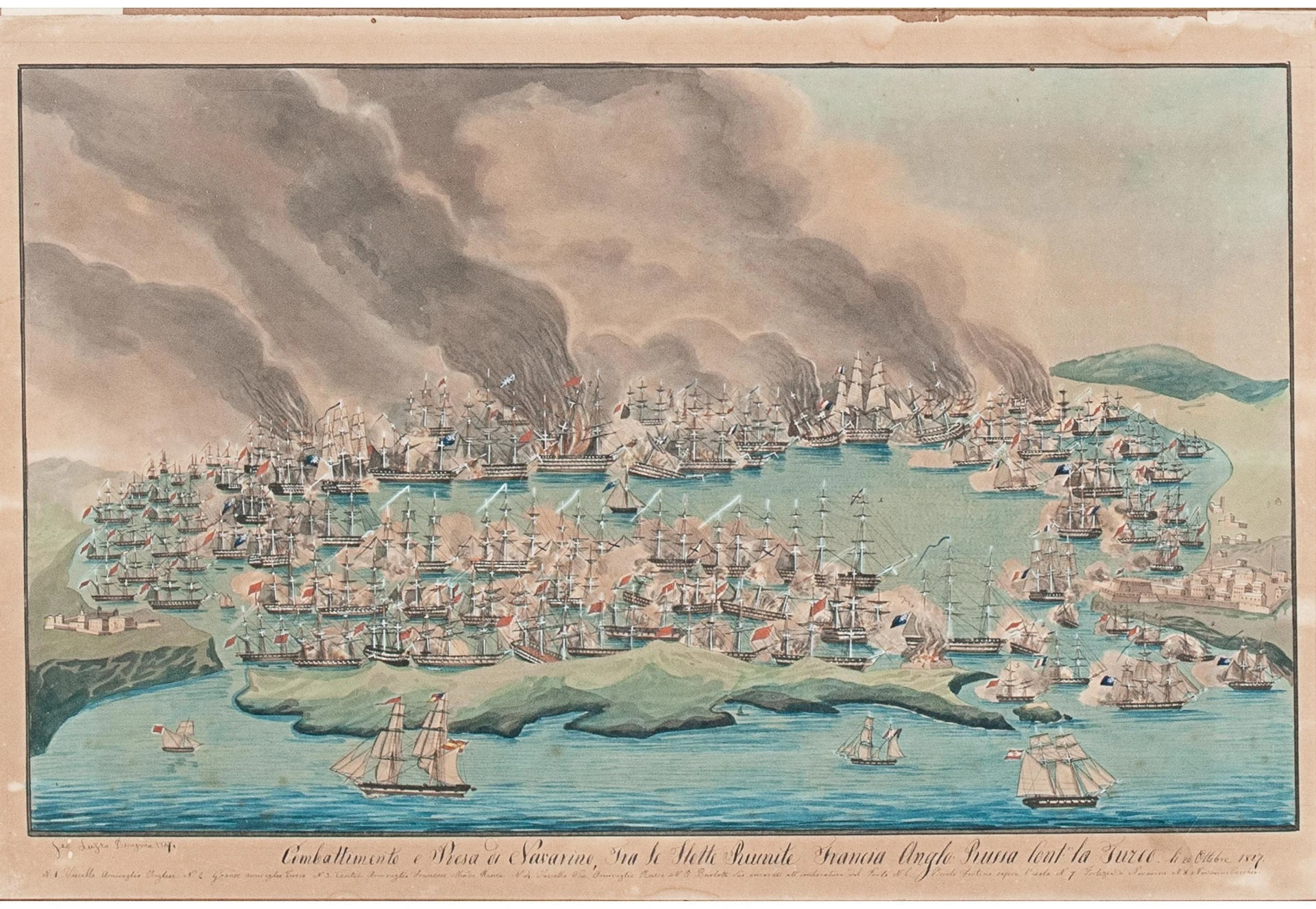
The Battle of Navarino, by Giovanni Luzzo, 1847

Whilst thus employed in the protection of trade on the coast of Cuba, Captain Maude was recalled home, to take the command of the Glasgow, 50 guns, his appointment to which ship bears date 9 February 1825. In October following, he took out Viscount Strangford, the British ambassador to the Court of St. Petersburgh; and on his return from Kronstadt, towards the end of November, was sent to join the squadron in the Tagus, under the orders of Lord Amelius Beauclerk. He subsequently proceeded to the Mediterranean, and there received the insignia of a C.B. and the Orders of St. Louis and St. Anne, for his conduct at the battle of Navarin, on 20 October 1827. The following are extracts of his commander-in-chief's official letter to the Lord High Admiral, reporting the issue of that action:

The French frigate Armide was directed to place herself alongside the outermost (Turco-Egyptian) frigate, on the left hand entering the harbour; and the Cambrian, Glasgow, and Talbot next to her, and abreast of the Asia, Genoa, and Albion; the Dartmouth and the Musquito, the Rose, the Brisk, and the Philomel, were to look after six fire-vessels, at the entrance of the harbour. * * * * Captain Fellowes executed the part allotted to him perfectly; and with the able assistance of his little, but brave detachment, saved the Syrene (French flag-ship) from being burnt by the fire-vessels. And the Cambrian, Glasgow, and Talbot, following the fine example of Capitaine Hugon, of the Armide, who was opposed to the leading frigate of that line, effectually destroyed their opponents, and also silenced the batteries.

Captain Maude continued on the Mediterranean station until August 1828; and paid off the Glasgow, at Chatham, on 8 September. He died in 1841.

== Personal life ==
Captain Maude married, on 18 October 1817, Albinia, second daughter of his Grace the Hon. Charles Brodrick, D.D., the Archbishop of Cashel.

== Honours ==
- Companion of the Order of the Bath (United Kingdom)
- Knight of the Order of Saint Louis (Kingdom of France)
- Knight of the Order of Saint Anna (Russian Empire)

== Sources ==
- Marshall, John (1829). "Hon. James Ashley Maude". Royal Naval Biography. Supplement. Part 3. London: Longman, Hurst, Rees, Orme, and Brown. pp. 249–250.
- Marshall, John (1833). "Hon. James Ashley Maude". Royal Naval Biography. Vol. 4. Part 1. London: Longman, Hurst, Rees, Orme, and Brown. pp. 424–428.
- "Sir James Ashley Maude". The British Museum.
