= Hassan Pasha al-Iskandarani =

Egyptian naval officer (1790–1854)

Amir al-Bahar Hassan Pasha al-Iskandarani Pasha
- حسن الإسكندراني
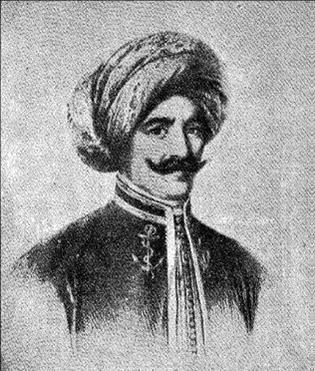
- Born: 1790; Angasia, Circassia
- Died: 1854 (aged 63–64); Crimea, Russian Empire
- Cause of death: Drowning
- Military career
- Allegiance: Egypt Eyalet
- Branch: Egyptian Navy
- Rank: Lieutenant
- Conflicts: Greek War of Independence: Battle of Navarino; Egyptian–Ottoman War (1839–1841); Crimean War

Lieutenant general Hassan Pasha al-Iskandarani (Egyptian Arabic: حسن باشا الإسكندراني; 1790 – 1854), born Zakaria (زكريا), was an Egyptian Navy Admiral who participated in the Battle of Navarino and the Crimean War.

== Early life ==
Zakaria, an Egyptian of Circassian origin, was born in 1790 in the city of Angasia (أنجاسيا) in the northern Circassian lands, close to the Black Sea. He was the third and last child of Imam Hassan, head of the Shruisheen tribe (قبيلة الشرويشيين). He came to Egypt when his father decided to perform the Hajj (pilgrimage to Mecca), and he intended to send his son to receive his education at al-Azhar in 1800, and his son was not more than 10 years old, when they arrived in Egypt, his father left him with one of his friends from the Selahdariya Mamluks until he returned, but death struck his father while he was on his way from Mecca to Medina, so Zakaria became an orphan.

Zakaria grew up in the care of his father's friend, and he worked with him in the manufacture of weapons. As fate would have it, he was commissioned by the wāli of Egypt, Muhammad Ali Pasha, in mid 1811 to manufacture a quantity of weapons to be used in a military campaign to suppress the Wahhabi rebellion in the Arabian Peninsula. When he completed making them, he carried them with Zakaria to the Uzbekiya Palace in Cairo, where Muhammad Ali met them, and the wāli's eyes fell on Hassan. He was so impressed by his boldness and deeds that he embraced him with compassion and used him in his diwan, so Zakaria abandoned his old name and preferred to give himself the name of his father, Hassan.

Muhammad Ali had begun his first attempts to reform the Egyptian army. Hassan responded well to the call and joined the army in the infantry, however, when he traveled in early September 1811 with Muhammad Ali Pasha to Suez and saw the nucleus of the Egyptian fleet sailing from its port to transport men and equipment to the Arabian Peninsula, Hassan - a native of the coast - realized that the waves of the sea were calling to him, so he prepared himself to enter the navy. After years he left the infantry to join the Egyptian naval mission in 1818 to the port of Toulon in France. He studied naval arts and mathematics, mastered the French language, and trained in the Toulon arsenal. After graduating from the French Naval School, he returned to Egypt.

== Career ==
After Hassan al-Iskandarani returned from France in 1825, when he was thirty-seven years old, he joined the Egyptian fleet, and was appointed to the rank of naval lieutenant. He demonstrated his competence and skill, and participated in the naval Battle of Navarino during the Greek War of Independence, which ended with the destruction of the Egyptian and Ottoman fleets.

Hassan was commanding the frigate “Al-Ihsaniyya” (الإحسانية), while Muharrem Bey, commander of the Egyptian fleet, held his banner on the frigate “Jihadiya” (جهادية). Fire broke out on Hassan al-Iskandarani's ship during the battle, and soon its masts, bulwarks, and other parts were ignited until it exploded and shook the entire surrounding due to its sound. Its commander refused to witness for himself the deportation of his men from it, facing the gravest dangers, until a bomb fell next to him and its fragments hit him in the face. Then another bomb followed, throwing him unconscious into the sea. Had it not been for the vigilance of his faithful Nubian servant, Faraj, who dived into the sea behind him and treated him immediately, he would not have been destined to survive.

The Navarino disaster did not waste the effort of Muhammad Ali Pasha and did not discourage him, so he began building ships and refining the resolve of the men until the Egyptian fleet - after the defeat of Navarino - ranked third among the fleets of countries.

On August 1, 1828, Muhammad Ali alone signed an agreement with the allies to evacuate the Egyptian army from Morea, specifying the manner of evacuation, considering that this was an act of Egyptian sovereignty, which aroused the ire of the Ottoman Sultan, the sovereign of Egypt, as a result of the ability and competence demonstrated by the Egyptian army on the battlefield in the Morea War, which made the allied countries negotiate directly with the governor of Egypt without the mediation of the Ottoman Empire, and Muhammad Ali began to take independent positions that overlooked the Ottoman Sultan, and began to dispute with him by trying to separate Egypt from the Ottoman Empire.

In early 1831, Ottoman threats and intrigues against Egypt were renewed. As a result, Muhammad Ali marched the Egyptian army overland in October, and in November units of the Egyptian fleet sailed from Alexandria, and Gaza, Jaffa, and Haifa, belonging to the Ottoman Empire, were handed over to him without a fight. On December 8, Muhammad Ali sent The frigate “Shir Jihad” (شير جهاد) led by Hassan al-Iskandarani, with the Egyptian fleet led by Othman Nour al-Din Pasha, the Nazir al-Bahria (Navy minister), participated in demolishing the fortress of Acre and eliminating its pro-Ottoman governor. Then in 1832, he headed to the islands of the Greek archipelago and eliminated the pirate operations until Muhammad Ali Pasha summoned him in early October and entrusted him with the command of Frigate No. 4, perhaps called “Abu Qir” (أبو قير). Most of the Egyptian fleet headed back to Alexandria, and light units remained to monitor the movements of the Ottomans.

Hassan al-Iskandarani was granted the title of Amir al-Bahar “Prince of the Seas” as a reward for him. Muhammad Ali had settled on marrying Hassan al-Iskandarani to one of the palace girls called Eltifat bint al-Ghoz. Hassan al-Iskandarani continued to board one ship after another, until Muhammad Ali appointed him second commander of the Egyptian fleet in 1833, and the arsenal and shipyards belonged to the authority of Hassan al-Iskandarani, and were subject to his direct supervision. He sent a number of Egyptian workers, engineers, and officers on missions to the ports of France to learn shipbuilding, and when they returned, he dispensed with most of the foreigners who were working in building them.

== Minister of Navy ==
In May 1837, al-Iskandarani was appointed Nazir (Minister) of the Egyptian Navy, and Muhammad Ali Pasha granted him the rank of “Pasha.” In November 1838, the Egyptian fleet, thanks to Hassan al-Iskandarani, was at the forefront of the worlund's fleets after the fleets of the United Kingdom and France.

== Leading the fleet in Crimea ==
With Abbas Pasha I assuming the rule of Egypt in November 1848, and with the Ottomans requesting Abbas I to help them in their war against Russia, Abbas Pasha ordered the naval commander, Hassan al-Iskandarani, to prepare the Egyptian fleet to participate in this war, which was known as the Crimean War.

Hassan Pasha equipped, reorganized, and renovated the fleet. The strength of that fleet was 12 warships, equipped with 642 cannons, and 6,850 naval soldiers.

He traveled at the head of the Egyptian fleet to Ottoman Turkey in 1853. The arrival of the Egyptian fleet to Turkey caused a shock of joy and excitement, and the Turkish authorities welcomed them. After the killing of Abbas I in his palace in Banha, July 1854, and after him Sa'id Pasha took office, the battles at Sevastopol had intensified on land and at sea and in some of the Crimean lands, the English and French suffered heavy losses, and the Egyptians suffered hardships and horrors due to the extreme cold, and many of them died.

== Death ==
On October 31, 1854, upon the return of Hassan Pasha al-Iskandarani, the commander of the fleet, at the head of his fleet, to Istanbul, to repair some ships, stormy winds in the Black Sea blew over it, and fog multiplied over it, which led to the ship “Miftah Jihad” (مفتاح جهاد), on which the commander of the naval army, Hassan al-Iskandarani, was located, colliding with rocks of the Black Sea, so the ship sank, and he and 1,920 Egyptian marines drowned. They contributed to the Russians losing a near-global war, and only 130 survived the sinking.

The Crimean War ended with the victory of the Ottomans and their allies, Egypt, UK, and France, over the Russians, and peace was concluded at the Paris Conference on March 30, 1856. The narrators, commanders of the allied armies, and the commander-in-chief of the allied armies unanimously agreed that the Egyptian soldiers raised their status in the eyes of everyone through their dedication, bravery, intensity of their struggle against the Russians, and their superiority within the Ottoman Turkish army.

== Honoring ==
The writer Ismat al-Iskandarani, the granddaughter of Hassan al-Iskandarani, revived her grandfather's military history. She published books in Arabic and French, praising Egypt's maritime glories, and gifted them to the Egyptian Navy. She also donated her house in Ras El-Tin to the Navy to be a nautical club, and she donated all of her property, including real estate, agricultural land, and money, to the Naval College, so she was nicknamed “Om al-Bahria" (أم البحرية, Mother of the Navy), as she was able to enter the headquarters of the Naval Forces at any time, and board any battleship or armored vehicle without being obstructed by any obstacles. The late President Gamal Abdel Nasser presented her with the “Golden Perfection” Medal in 1955.

There is a street in Alexandria carrying his name.
