= French ship Scipion (1813) =

Ship of the line of the French Navy

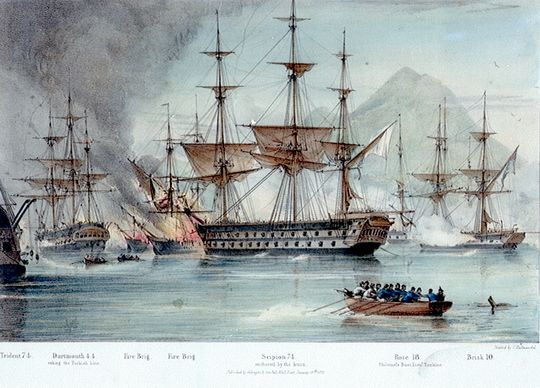
- The Battle of Navarino; Scipion is shown in the centre, entangled with a fireship

History

France
- Name: Scipion
- Launched: 5 September 1813
- Commissioned: 1813
- Stricken: 1846
- Fate: Broken up

General characteristics
- Class & type: Téméraire-class ship of the line
- Displacement: 3,069 tonneaux
- Tons burthen: 1,537 port tonneaux
- Length: 55.87 m (183 ft 4 in)
- Beam: 14.46 m (47 ft 5 in)
- Draught: 7.15 m (23.5 ft)
- Depth of hold: 7.15 m (23 ft 5 in)
- Sail plan: Full-rigged ship
- Crew: 705
- Armament: 74 guns: Lower gun deck: 28 × 36 pdr guns; Upper gun deck: 30 × 18 pdr guns; Forecastle and Quarterdeck: 16–28 × 8 pdr guns and 36 pdr carronades

Scipion was a 74-gun Téméraire-class ship of the line built for the French Navy during the 1810s. Completed in 1814, she participated in the Battle of Navarino in 1827.

== Description ==
Designed by Jacques-Noël Sané, the Téméraire-class ships had a length of 55.87 metres (183 ft 4 in), a beam of 14.46 metres (47 ft 5 in) and a depth of hold of 7.15 metres (23 ft 5 in). The ships displaced 3,069 tonneaux and had a mean draught of 7.15 metres (23 ft 5 in). They had a tonnage of 1,537 port tonneaux. Their crew numbered 705 officers and ratings during wartime. They were fitted with three masts and ship rigged.

The muzzle-loading, smoothbore armament of the Téméraire class consisted of twenty-eight 36-pounder long guns on the lower gun deck and thirty 18-pounder long guns on the upper gun deck. After about 1807, the armament on the quarterdeck and forecastle varied widely between ships with differing numbers of 8-pounder long guns and 36-pounder carronades. The total number of guns varied between sixteen and twenty-eight. The 36-pounder obusiers formerly mounted on the poop deck (dunette) in older ships were removed as obsolete.

== Construction and career ==
Scipion was ordered on 28 February 1812 and was laid down that same month in French-occupied Genoa, Italy. The ship was launched on 5 September 1813. The ship was commissioned on 19 December and completed in February 1814. On 30 September 1827, Scipion collided with Provence, which sustained serious damage and had to return to Toulon for repairs. On 20 October 1827, she took part in the Battle of Navarino, under Pierre Bernard Milius, sailing behind the Sirène in the line. At the outbreak of the battle, Scipion narrowly escaped destruction by a fireship which became jammed under her bowsprit; her fore sails caught fire and the fire spread into the upper gun-deck, but was eventually put out by the crew. Trident succeeded in attaching a tow-line to the fireship and, with the assistance of HMS Dartmouth and two other British boats, pulling it clear. Sirène, Trident and Scipion then proceeded to silence the batteries of the fort of Navarino. She was struck on 20 February 1846.

== Bibliography ==
- Roche, Jean-Michel (2005). Dictionnaire des bâtiments de la flotte de guerre française de Colbert à nos jours [Dictionary of French Warships from Colbert to Today]. Vol. 1: 1671-1870. Roche. ISBN 978-2-9525917-0-6. OCLC 165892922.
- Winfield, Rif and Roberts, Stephen S. (2015) French Warships in the Age of Sail 1786-1861: Design, Construction, Careers and Fates. Seaforth Publishing. ISBN 978-1-84832-204-2
