= French ship Breslaw (1808) =

Ship of the line of the French Navy

- Scale model of Achille, sister ship of French ship Breslaw (1808), on display at the Musée national de la Marine in Paris.

History

France
- Name: Breslaw
- Namesake: Wrocław
- Ordered: 24 October 1804
- Builder: Genoa
- Laid down: February 1805
- Launched: 3 May 1808
- Decommissioned: 1837
- Fate: Broken up

General characteristics
- Class & type: petit Téméraire-class ship of the line
- Displacement: 2,781 tonneaux
- Tons burthen: 1,381 port tonneaux
- Length: 53.97 m (177 ft 1 in)
- Beam: 14.29 m (46 ft 11 in)
- Draught: 6.72 m (22.0 ft)
- Depth of hold: 6.9 m (22 ft 8 in)
- Sail plan: Full-rigged ship
- Crew: 705
- Armament: 74 guns: Lower gun deck: 28 × 36 pdr guns; Upper gun deck: 30 × 18 pdr guns; Forecastle and Quarterdeck: 20–26 × 8 pdr guns & 36 pdr carronades

Breslaw was a 74-gun petite Téméraire-class ship of the line built for the French Navy during the first decade of the 19th century. Completed in 1808, she played a major role in the Battle of Navarino in 1827.

== Background and description ==
Commerce de Lyon was one of the petit modèle of the Téméraire class that was specially intended for construction in some of the shipyards in countries occupied by the French, where there was less depth of water than in the main French shipyards. The ships had a length of 53.97 metres (177 ft 1 in), a beam of 14.29 metres (46 ft 11 in) and a depth of hold of 6.9 metres (22 ft 8 in). The ships displaced 2,781 tonneaux and had a mean draught of 6.72 metres (22 ft 1 in). They had a tonnage of 1,381 port tonneaux. Their crew numbered 705 officers and ratings during wartime. They were fitted with three masts and ship rigged.

The muzzle-loading, smoothbore armament of the Téméraire class consisted of twenty-eight 36-pounder long guns on the lower gun deck and thirty 18-pounder long guns on the upper gun deck. The petit modèle ships ordered in 1803–1804 were intended to mount sixteen 8-pounder long guns on their forecastle and quarterdeck, plus four 36-pounder obusiers on the poop deck (dunette). Later ships were intended to have fourteen 8-pounders and ten 36-pounder carronades without any obusiers, but the numbers of 8-pounders and carronades actually varied between a total of 20 to 26 weapons.

== Construction and career ==
Breslaw was ordered as Superbe on 24 October 1804 and laid down in March 1805 in Genoa, Italy. The ship was renamed Breslaw on 14 May 1807 and launched on 3 May 1808. She was commissioned on 9 August 1808 by Captain Joseph Allemand, and completed in December. Breslaw departed Genoa for Toulon on 20 January 1809 to join the Mediterranean Squadron, along with the corvette Victorieuse; the ships crossed safely, arriving on 26, but collided off the harbour. Refitted in 1824, Breslaw participated in the Battle of Navarino, on 20 October 1827. She played a decisive role in the battle when her captain, La Bretonnière, took the initiative of leaving the French squadron, which had safely completed its objectives, to reinforce HMS Albion, which was trapped and in danger of being overwhelmed by the Ottoman fleet. Breslaw took part in the Invasion of Algiers in 1830 under Captain Maillard de Liscourt, notably landing troops at Sidi Ferruch on 16 June. Refitted again in 1831, the ship was struck in 1837.
