= Russian corvette Navarin =

History

Ottoman Egypt
- Name: Nessabih Sabah
- Builder: Venice
- Captured: By the Imperial Russian Navy, 21 April 1828

Russian Empire
- Name: Navarin
- Namesake: Battle of Navarino
- Acquired: Captured, 21 April 1828 (Note: All dates used in this article are Old Style)
- Fate: Sold for scrap, 1854

General characteristics
- Type: 20-gun corvette
- Length: 128 ft (39.0 m) (p/p)
- Beam: 32 ft (9.8 m)
- Draft: 10 ft (3.0 m)
- Complement: 160
- Armament: 4 × 12-pounder guns; 16 × 18-pounder carronades

The Russian corvette Navarin (Russian: Наварин) was an Egyptian corvette captured during the Russo-Turkish War of 1828–1829 and placed into service by the Russians. She remained in the Mediterranean until 1830 when she was transferred to the Baltic Fleet. Navarin remained there until she was ordered to the Far East in late 1853. She was so badly damaged by a series of storms en route that she was deemed too expensive to repair and was sold for scrap in the Netherlands in 1854.

== Description and career ==
Navarin was 128 feet (39.0 m) long between perpendiculars, with a beam of 32 feet (9.8 m) and a draft of 10 feet (3.0 m). She was armed with four 12-pounder smoothbore guns and sixteen 18-pounder smoothbore carronades. Her crew numbered 160 officers and enlisted men.

Almost nothing is known about Navarin's early history other than she was built in Venice. She was named Nessabih Sabah and was serving as a sixth rate corvette in the Ottoman Egyptian Navy when she was captured by the frigate Kastor and the ship of the line Iezekiil off Modon, Greece on 21 April 1828 during the Russo-Turkish War. The ship was renamed Navarin, after the recent naval victory over the Turks in the Battle of Navarino, and used by the Russians against the Turks in the Mediterranean for the rest of the war.

The ship was placed under the command of 27-year-old Commander (later Admiral) Pavel Stepanovich Nakhimov, and he commanded her during the Dardanelles blockade of the Russo-Turkish War (1828–1829), under Admiral Mikhail Lazarev.

She was ordered to Kronstadt in 1830 and served with the Baltic Fleet for most of the rest of her career. The ship was sent to Denmark in 1850 during the First Schleswig War between the Danes and the Prussians to show Russian support for the Danes. Three years later, Navarin was ordered to the Far East, but was twice forced to put into Portsmouth in November and December 1853 to repair storm damage suffered in the North Sea. On her third attempt, the ship reached the North Atlantic, but again was badly damaged during a storm and was forced to seek refuge in Vlissingen, the Netherlands. The cost to repair the ship was uneconomical and Navarin was sold there in 1854 for ƒ36,161.

== See also ==
- Russian ship Azov (1826)
