= French ship Trident (1811) =

Ship of the line of the French Navy

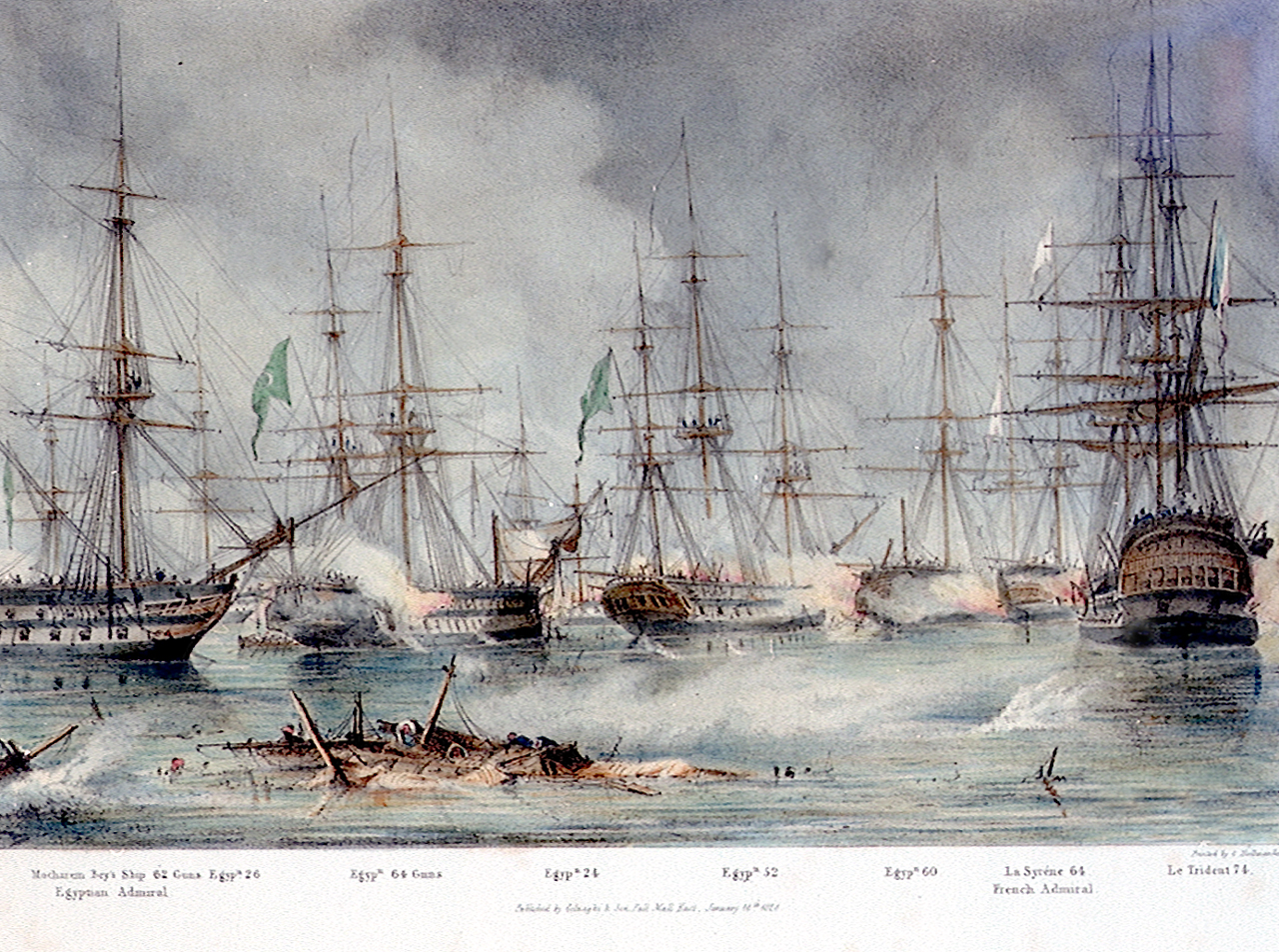
- Le Trident at the Battle of Navarino, 20 Oct 1827, drawn by George Philip Reinagle on HMS Mosquito

History

France
- Name: Trident
- Namesake: Trident
- Builder: Toulon
- Laid down: 15 November 1809
- Launched: 9 June 1811
- Commissioned: December 1811
- Stricken: 24 November 1857
- Fate: Broken up 1874-75

General characteristics
- Class & type: Téméraire-class ship of the line
- Displacement: 3,069 tonneaux
- Tons burthen: 1,537 port tonneaux
- Length: 55.87 m (183 ft 4 in)
- Beam: 14.46 m (47 ft 5 in)
- Draught: 7.15 m (23.5 ft)
- Depth of hold: 7.15 m (23 ft 5 in)
- Sail plan: Full-rigged ship
- Crew: 705
- Armament: 74 guns: Lower gun deck: 28 × 36 pdr guns; Upper gun deck: 30 × 18 pdr guns; Forecastle and Quarterdeck: 16–28 × 8 pdr guns and 36 pdr carronades

The Trident was a 74-gun Téméraire-class ship of the line built for the French Navy during the first decade of the 19th century. Completed in 1812, she played a minor role in the Napoleonic Wars.

== Description ==
Designed by Jacques-Noël Sané, the Téméraire-class ships had a length of 55.87 metres (183 ft 4 in), a beam of 14.46 metres (47 ft 5 in) and a depth of hold of 7.15 metres (23 ft 5 in). The ships displaced 3,069 tonneaux and had a mean draught of 7.15 metres (23 ft 5 in). They had a tonnage of 1,537 port tonneaux. Their crew numbered 705 officers and ratings during wartime. They were fitted with three masts and ship rigged.

The muzzle-loading, smoothbore armament of the Téméraire class consisted of twenty-eight 36-pounder long guns on the lower gun deck and thirty 18-pounder long guns on the upper gun deck. After about 1807, the armament on the quarterdeck and forecastle varied widely between ships with differing numbers of 8-pounder long guns and 36-pounder carronades. The total number of guns varied between sixteen and twenty-eight. The 36-pounder obusiers formerly mounted on the poop deck (dunette) in older ships were removed as obsolete.

== Construction and career ==
Trident was laid down on 15 November 1809 at the Arsenal de Toulon and launched on 9 June 1811. The ship was commissioned on 1 January 1812 and completed in September. On 13 February 1814, she was part of Julien Cosmao's squadron which was intercepted off Toulon by a British blockade. Her sister ship Romulus, at the rear, managed to hold off the British ships long enough for the rest of the squadron to escape.

In 1823, during the Spanish expedition, Trident took part in the bombardment of Cadiz, along with Centaure. In 1827, at the Battle of Navarino, she silenced coastal defences with the Sirène. She took part in the Invasion of Algiers in 1830. In 1831, the ship served as flagship of the Toulon squadron under Rear-admiral Baron Hugon, and took part in the Battle of the Tagus under Captain Casy, reaching Lisbon. In 1854, she took part in the Crimean War, and was used as a troop ship the next year in the Black Sea.

She was struck on 24 November 1857 and was used as a barracks hulk from 1857 to 1869. She was broken up in 1874-1875.
