= Kartería =

Hellenic steam-powered warship

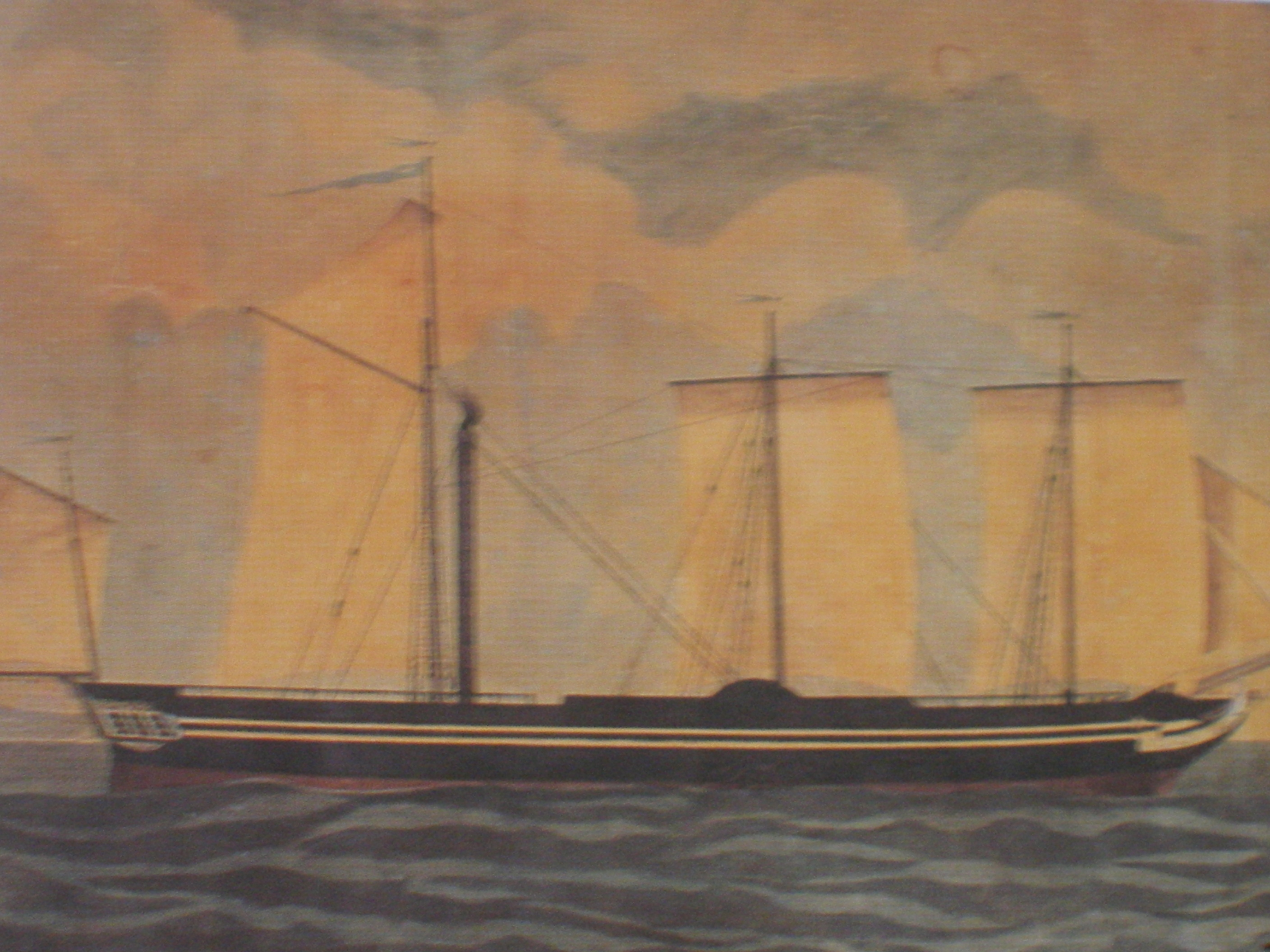
- Karteria

History

Revolutionary Greece
- Name: Karteria
- Commissioned: 1826
- Out of service: 1831

General characteristics
- Displacement: 233 tons
- Length: 38.4 m (126 ft 0 in)
- Beam: 7.6 m (24 ft 11 in)
- Propulsion: steam paddles/sail
- Speed: 7 knots (under steam)
- Crew: 185
- Armament: 4 68-pounder carronades, 4 68-pounder cannon

Hellenic sloop-of-war Kartería (Καρτερία; Greek for "Perseverance") was the first steam-powered warship to be used in combat operations in history. It was built in 1825 in an English shipyard for the revolutionary Hellenic Navy during the Greek War of Independence, on the order of Capt Frank Abney Hastings, a former Royal Navy officer who had volunteered his services to the Hellenic Navy.

The vessel was built by Daniel Brent Shipwrights in the Greenland South Dockyard, Rotherhithe, London. It was financed mainly from the proceeds of the 2nd Greek Loan raised by the London Philhellenic Committee, but also by Capt Hastings' private funds.

The 233-ton vessel was propelled by steam-powered paddles. Power was generated by 2 small steam engines. The vessel also featured 4 masts and could operate under sail: it was envisaged that the vessel would normally cruise under wind power, but switch to steam-power during combat operations, to allow maximum maneuvrability. It was armed with just 8 guns but all were 68-pounders, the most powerful calibre. The on-board furnaces that burnt coal to generate steam could also be used to heat cannon-shot to a red-hot state, creating highly incendiary missiles.

== Active service ==
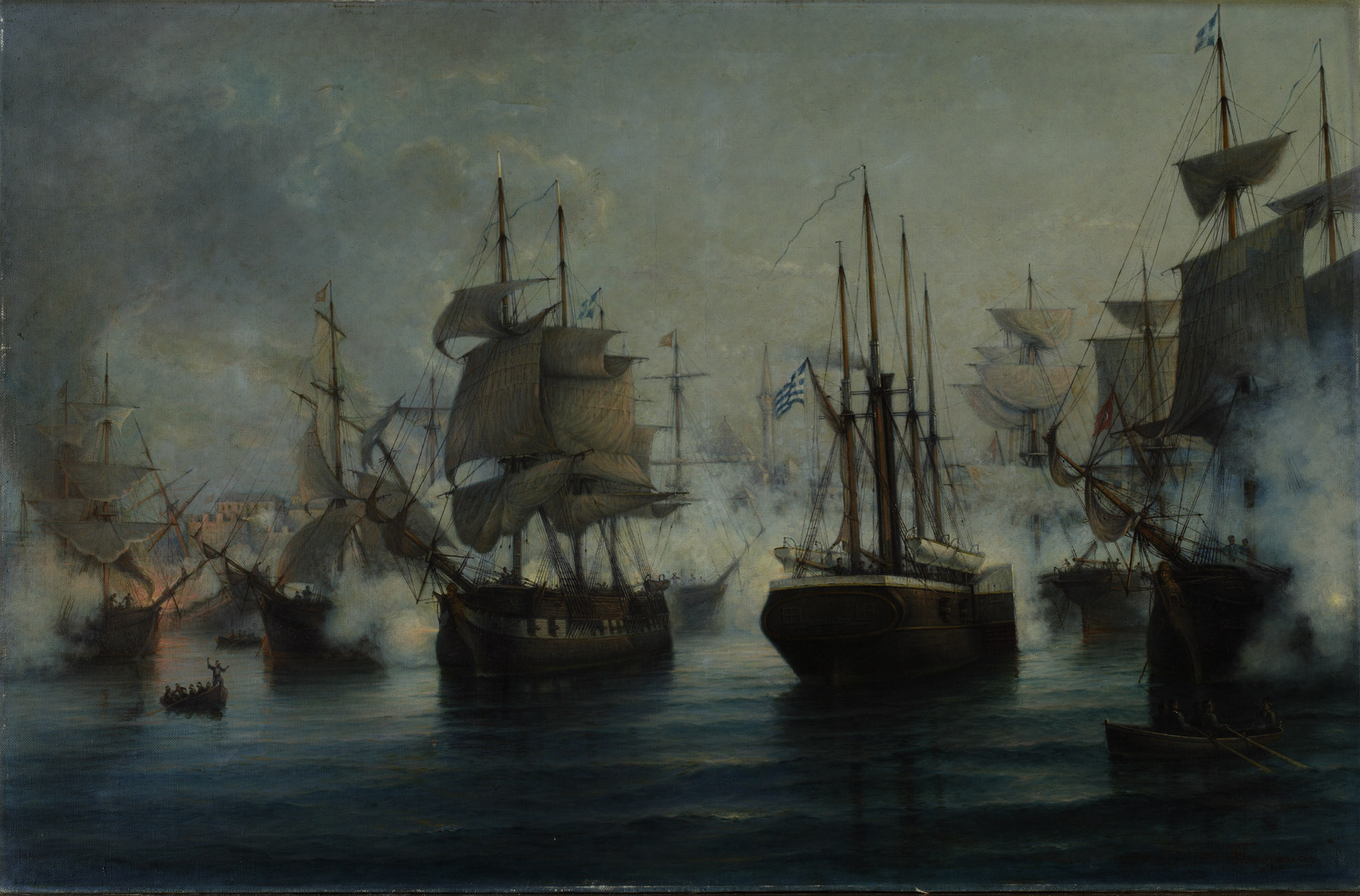
Painting showing the Karteria (centre-right, with sails down and smoke issuing from funnel) in action at the Battle of Itea (1827). Note that the Karteria is advancing under steam against the wind, in contrast with the two flanking Greek warships

The ship entered service in Greece in 1826. It was the first steam warship to see combat. (The first steam warship ever built was American, the USS Demologos, a 30-gun armoured warship launched in 1814, but never used in battle).

Under the command of Hastings, the Kartería soon gained a fearsome combat reputation, taking part in numerous operations against the Ottoman Navy. (The Karteria fired 18,000 rounds in 1827 alone). The ship's most celebrated success was a raid on the port of Itea, near Salona (Amfissa) in the Gulf of Corinth, on 29/30 September 1827, where it sank 9 Ottoman ships.
