= Battle of Navarino =

1827 naval battle during the Greek War of Independence

- Part of the Greek War of Independence
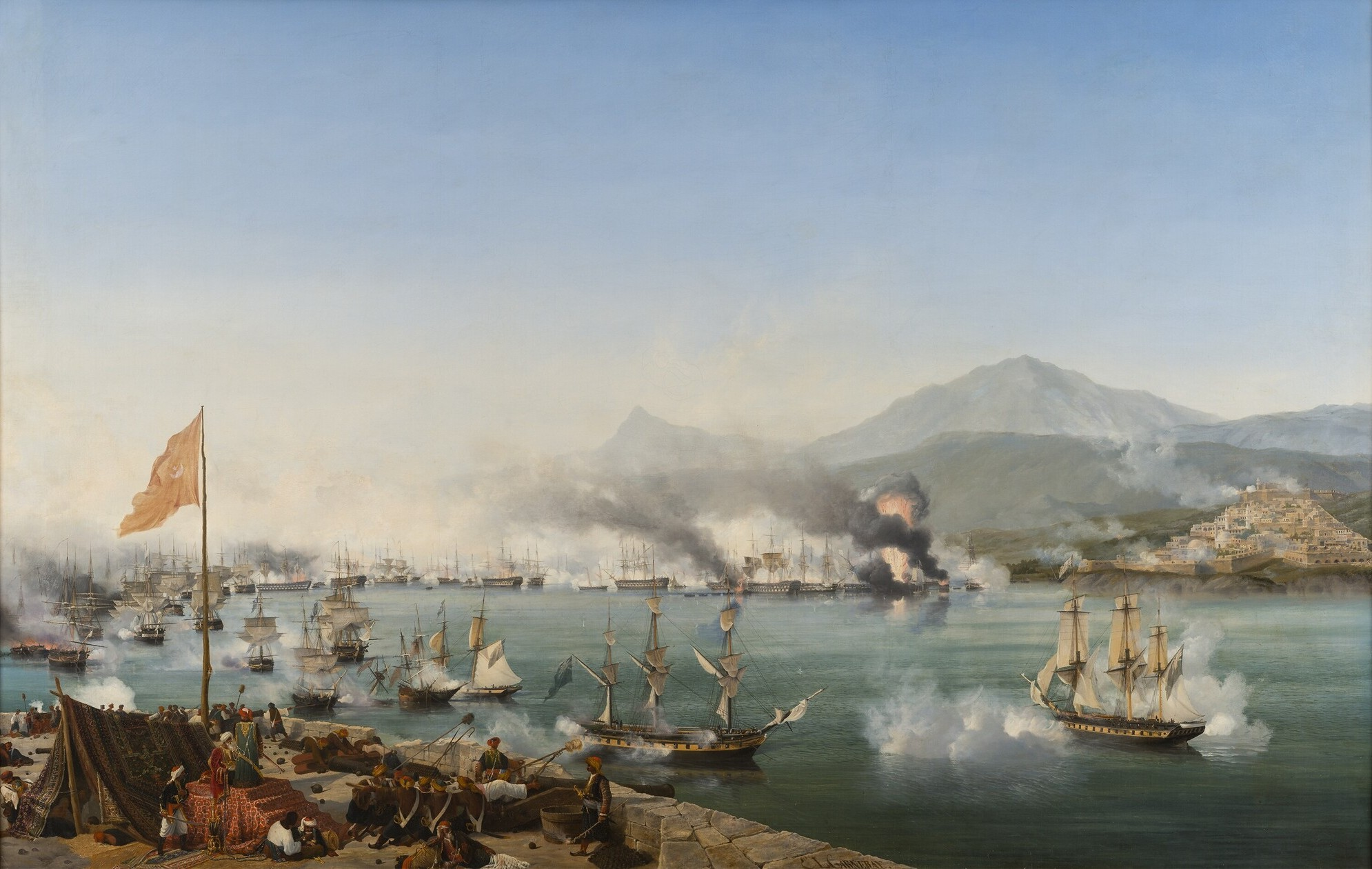
- The Naval Battle of Navarino; Ambroise Louis Garneray, 1827
Date	20 October 1827
Location	Navarino harbour, Ionian Sea 36°56′09″N 21°41′16″E
Result	Allied victory

Belligerents
United Kingdom; France; Russia	Ottoman Empire; Egypt; Regency of Algiers

Commanders and leaders
(United Kingdom of Great Britain and Ireland) Edward Codrington (Russian Empire) Lodewijk van Heiden (Bourbon Restoration in France) Henri de Rigny	Emir Tahir Pasha; Müharrem Bey; Anonymous captain Bey; Hassan Pasha al-Iskandarani

Strength
10 ships of the line; (Russian Empire) 4 ships; (United Kingdom of Great Britain and Ireland) 3 ships; (Kingdom of France) 3 ships; 10 frigates; (Russian Empire) 4 ships; (United Kingdom of Great Britain and Ireland) 4 ships; (Kingdom of France) 2 ships; (United Kingdom of Great Britain and Ireland) 4 sloops (Kingdom of France) 2 schooners (United Kingdom of Great Britain and Ireland) 1 cutter (OOB) 1,252 guns 8,000 crewmen	3 ships of the line 17 frigates 30 corvettes 5 schooners 28 brigs 5–6 fireships (OOB) 2,158 guns 20,000 crewmen

Casualties and losses
181 killed 480 wounded	4,000 killed or wounded 4,000 captured 55 ships lost
- Location within Peloponnese Battle of Navarino (Greece)

The Battle of Navarino was a naval battle fought on 20 October (O.S. 8 October) 1827, during the Greek War of Independence (1821–1829), in Navarino Bay (modern Pylos), on the west coast of the Peloponnese peninsula, in the Ionian Sea. Allied forces from Britain, France, and Russia decisively defeated Ottoman and Egyptian forces which were trying to suppress the Greeks, thereby making Greek independence much more likely. An Ottoman armada which, in addition to Imperial warships, included squadrons from the eyalets of Egypt and Regency of Algiers and Tunis, (Note: The fleet of the Regency of Algiers did not participate at Navarino: "Most of the Algerian ships were away on convoy duty when the Battle of Navarino occurred in 1827, and so avoided the severe loss suffered on that occasion by the Tunisian contingent".) was destroyed by an Allied force of British, French and Russian warships. It was the last major naval battle in history to be fought entirely with sailing ships, although most ships fought at anchor. The Allies' victory was achieved through superior firepower and gunnery.

The context of the three Great Powers' intervention in the Greek conflict was the Russian Empire's long-running expansion at the expense of the decaying Ottoman Empire. Russia's ambitions in the region were seen as a major geostrategic threat by the other European powers, which feared the disintegration of the Ottoman Empire and the establishment of Russian hegemony in the Eastern Mediterranean. The precipitating factor was support of elements in Orthodox Russia for Greek coreligionists, despite the opposition of Tsar Alexander in 1821 following the Greek rebellion against their Ottoman overlords. Similarly, despite official British interest in maintaining the Ottoman Empire, British public opinion strongly supported the Greeks. Fearing unilateral Russian action, Britain and France bound Russia, by treaty, to a joint intervention which aimed to secure Greek autonomy, whilst still preserving Ottoman territorial integrity as a check on Russia.

The Powers agreed, by the Treaty of London (1827), to force the Ottoman government to grant the Greeks autonomy within the empire and despatched naval squadrons to the Eastern Mediterranean to enforce their policy. The naval battle happened more by accident than by design as a result of a manoeuvre by the Allied commander-in-chief, Admiral Edward Codrington, aimed at coercing the Ottoman commander to obey Allied instructions. The sinking of the Ottomans' Mediterranean fleet saved the fledgling Greek Republic from collapse. But it required two more military interventions, by Russia in the form of the Russo-Turkish War of 1828–29 and a French expeditionary force to the Peloponnese to force the withdrawal of Ottoman forces from central and southern Greece, to finally secure Greek independence.

== Background ==
The Ottoman Turks had conquered the Greek-controlled Byzantine Empire during the 15th century, taking over its territory and its capital, Constantinople, and becoming its effective successor-state. In 1821, Greek nationalists revolted against the Ottomans, aiming to liberate ethnic Greeks from four centuries of Ottoman rule. Fighting raged for several years but by 1825, a stalemate had developed, with the Greeks unable to drive the Ottomans out of most of Greece, but the Ottomans were unable to crush the revolt definitively. However, in 1825, the Sultan succeeded in breaking the stalemate. He persuaded his powerful wali (viceroy) of Egypt, Muhammad Ali Pasha, who was technically his vassal but in practice autonomous, to deploy his Western-trained and equipped army and navy against the Greeks. In return, the Sultan promised to grant the rebel heartland, the Peloponnese, as a hereditary fief to Ali's eldest son, Ibrahim. In February 1825, Ibrahim led an expeditionary force of 16,000 into the Peloponnese, and soon overran its western part; he failed, however, to take the eastern section, where the rebel government was based (at Nafplion).

The Greek revolutionaries remained defiant, and appointed experienced philhellenic British officers at the head of the army and fleet: Maj Sir Richard Church (land) and Lord Cochrane (sea). By this time however, the Greek provisional government's land and sea forces were far inferior to those of the Ottomans and Egyptians: in 1827, Greek regular troops numbered less than 5,000, compared to 25,000 Ottomans in central Greece and 15,000 Egyptians in the Peloponnese. Also, the Greek government was virtually bankrupt. Many of the key fortresses on what little territory it controlled were in Ottoman hands. It seemed only a matter of time before the Greeks were forced to capitulate. At this critical juncture, the Greek cause was rescued by the decision of three Great Powers—Great Britain, France and Russia—to intervene jointly in the conflict.

== Diplomacy of the Great Powers ==
From the inception of the Greek revolt until 1826, Anglo-Austrian diplomatic efforts were aimed at ensuring the non-intervention of the other great powers in the conflict. Their objective was to stall Russian military intervention in support of the Greeks, in order to give the Ottomans time to defeat the rebellion. However, the Ottomans proved unable to suppress the revolt during the long period of non-intervention secured by Anglo-Austrian diplomacy. By the time the Ottomans were making serious progress, the situation evolved in ways that would make non-interventionism untenable. In December 1825, the diplomatic landscape changed with the death of Tsar Alexander and the succession of his younger brother Nicholas I to the Russian throne. Nicholas was a more decisive and risk-taking character than his brother, as well as being far more nationalistic. The British government's response to the evolving situation was to move towards joint intervention instead of limiting Russian expansionism. Britain, France, and Russia signed the Treaty of London on 6 July 1827. The treaty called for an immediate armistice between the belligerents, in effect demanding a cessation of Ottoman military operations in Greece just when the Ottomans had victory in their grasp. It also offered Allied mediation in the negotiations on a final settlement that were to follow the armistice. The treaty called on the Ottomans to grant Greece a degree of autonomy, but envisaged it ultimately remaining under Ottoman suzerainty.

A secret clause in the agreement provided that if the Ottomans failed to accept the armistice within a month, each signatory Power would despatch a consul to Nafplion, the capital of the Hellenic Republic, thereby granting de facto recognition to the rebel government, something no Power had done hitherto. The same clause authorized the signatories in concert to instruct their naval commanders in the Mediterranean to "take all measures that circumstances may suggest" (i.e. including military action) to enforce the Allied demands, if the Ottomans failed to comply within the specified time limit. However, the clause added that Allied commanders should not take sides in the conflict. On 20 August 1827, the British naval commander-in-chief in the Mediterranean, Vice-Admiral of the Blue Sir Edward Codrington, a veteran of 44 years at sea and a popular hero for his role in the Battle of Trafalgar, received his government's instructions regarding enforcement of the treaty. Codrington could not have been a less suitable person for a task which required great tact. An impetuous fighting sailor, he entirely lacked diplomatic finesse, a quality he despised and derisively ascribed to his French counterpart, Henri de Rigny. He was also a sympathiser with the Greek cause, having subscribed to the London Philhellenic Committee.

== Order of battle ==
Exact figures for the Ottoman/Egyptian fleet are difficult to establish. The figures given above are mainly those enclosed by Codrington in his report. These were obtained by one of his officers from the French secretary of the Ottoman fleet, a M. Letellier. However, another report by Letellier to the British ambassador to the Ottomans gives two more frigates and 20 fewer corvettes/brigs for a total of 60 warships. James assesses the Ottomans' "effective" strength as even lower: three ships of the line, 15 large frigates and 18 corvettes, totaling just 36 ships.

=== Ships ===
British squadron (Vice Admiral Edward Codrington)
Ship	Rate	Guns	Navy	Commander	Casualties			Notes
Ship	Rate	Guns	Navy	Commander	Killed	Wounded	Total	Notes
Asia	Second-rate	84		Captain Edward Curzon; commander Robert Lambert Baynes	18	67	85	Flagship of the British squadron, flagship of the Allied fleet.
Genoa	Third-rate	76		Captain Walter Bathurst; commander Richard Dickenson	26	33	59	
Albion	Third-rate	74		Captain John Acworth Ommanney; commander John Norman Campbell	10	50	60	
Glasgow	Fifth-rate	50		Captain Hon. James Ashley Maude	0	2	2	
Cambrian	Fifth-rate	48		Captain Gawen William Hamilton, C.B.	1	1	2	
Dartmouth	Fifth-rate	42	(United Kingdom)	Captain Thomas Fellowes, C.B.	6	8	14	
Talbot	Sixth-rate	28	(United Kingdom)	Captain Hon. Frederick Spencer	6	17	23	
HMS Rose	Sloop	18	(United Kingdom)	Commander Lewis Davies	3	15	18	
HMS Brisk	Brig-sloop	10		Commander Hon. William Anson	1	2	3	
HMS Musquito	Brig-sloop	10	(United Kingdom)	Commander George Bohun Martin	2	4	6	
HMS Philomel	Brig-sloop	10	(United Kingdom)	Commander Henry Chetwynd-Talbot	1	7	8	
HMS Hind	Cutter	10	(United Kingdom)					

French squadron (Rear Admiral Henri de Rigny)
Ship	Rate	Guns	Navy	Commander	Casualties			Notes
Ship	Rate	Guns	Navy	Commander	Killed	Wounded	Total	Notes
Breslaw	Second-rate	84	(France)	Captain Botherel de La Bretonnière	1	14	15	
Scipion	Third-rate	80	(France)	Captain Pierre Bernard Milius	2	36	38	
Trident	Third-rate	74	(France)	Captain Morice	0	7	7	
Sirène	First-rank frigate	60	(France)	Contre-amiral Henri de Rigny, Captain Robert	2	42	44	Flagship of the French squadron.
Armide	Second-rank frigate	44	(France)	Captain Hugon	14	29	43	
Alcyone	Schooner	10 to 16	(France)	Captain Turpin	1	9	10	
Daphné	Schooner	6	(France)	Captain Frézier	1	5	6	

Russian squadron (Rear Admiral Lodewijk van Heiden)
Ship	Rate	Guns	Navy	Commander	Casualties			Notes
Ship	Rate	Guns	Navy	Commander	Killed	Wounded	Total	Notes
Gangut	Second-rate	84	(Russian Empire)	Captain Alexander Pavlovich Avinov	14	37	51	Lieutenant Pyotr Anjou distinguished himself during the battle.
Azov	Third-rate	80	(Russian Empire)	Captain Mikhail Lazarev	24	67	91	Flagship of the Russian squadron.
Iezekiil'	Third-rate	80	(Russian Empire)	Captain Svinkin	13	18	31	
Aleksandr Nevskii	Third-rate	80	(Russian Empire)	Captain Bogdanovich	5	7	12	
Provornyi	Fifth-rate	48	(Russian Empire)	Captain Yepanchin	3	4	7	
Konstantin	Fifth-rate	44	(Russian Empire)	Commander Khrushchev	0	1	1	
Elena	Fifth-rate	38	(Russian Empire)	Captain Yepanchin	0	5	5	
Kastor	Fifth-rate	36	(Russian Empire)	Captain Sytin	0	0	0	

=== Ottomans ===
Imperial squadron (Amir Tahir)
Ship	Rate	Guns	Navy	Commander	Casualties			Notes
Ship	Rate	Guns	Navy	Commander	Killed	Wounded	Total	Notes
Ghiuh Rewan	Third-rate	84	Ottoman Empire		~650			Flagship, commander-in-chief
Fahti Bahri	Third-rate	74	Ottoman Empire					Flagship
Burj Zafer	Third-rate	70	Ottoman Empire		~400			
Fevz Nusrat	Double-decked frigate	64	Ottoman Empire					
Ka'íd Zafer	Double-decked frigate	64	Ottoman Empire					
Keywan Bahri	Double-decked frigate	48	Ottoman Empire					
Feyz Mi' 'raj	Double-decked frigate	48	Ottoman Empire					
Mejra Zafer	Double-decked frigate	48	Ottoman Empire					
Guerrière	Double-decked frigate	60	(Ottoman Empire) Egypt Eyalet					Flagship Moharrem Bey
Ihsanya	Double-decked frigate	64	(Ottoman Empire) Egypt Eyalet					Flagship Hassen Bey
Surya	Double-decked frigate	56	(Ottoman Empire) Egypt Eyalet					
Leone	Double-decked frigate	60	(Ottoman Empire) Egypt Eyalet					
8 single-deck frigates, 30 corvettes, 5 schooners, 28 brigs, and 5–6 fireships. The corvettes and brigs carried 1,134 guns.

Source: Compiled from information in W. James Naval History of Great Britain (London, 1837) Vol. VI, pp. 476–489 and the French Revue maritime et coloniale de 1883.

** Ottoman Empire/Egypt/Tunisia (Ibrahim Pasha)

- Motosh Bey Squadron (Alexandria): two ships of the line, five frigates, 12 corvettes
- Moharram Bey Squadron (Alexandria): four frigates, 11 corvettes, 21 brigs, five schooners, and five or six fireships
- Tunis Squadron: two frigates, one brig
- Tahir Pasha Squadron (Admiral commanding) (Constantinople): one ship of the line, six frigates, seven corvettes, six brigs

== Battle ==
=== Preliminary moves ===
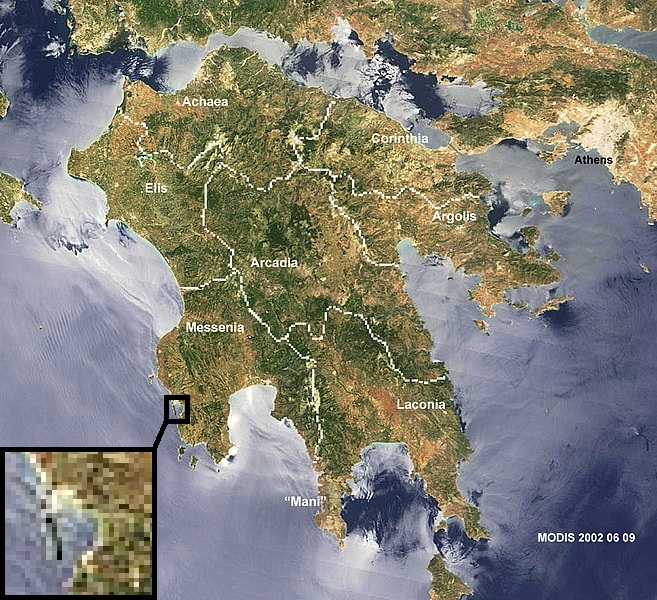
Satellite picture of the Peloponnese. Navarino Bay is visible in the inset in the lower left.

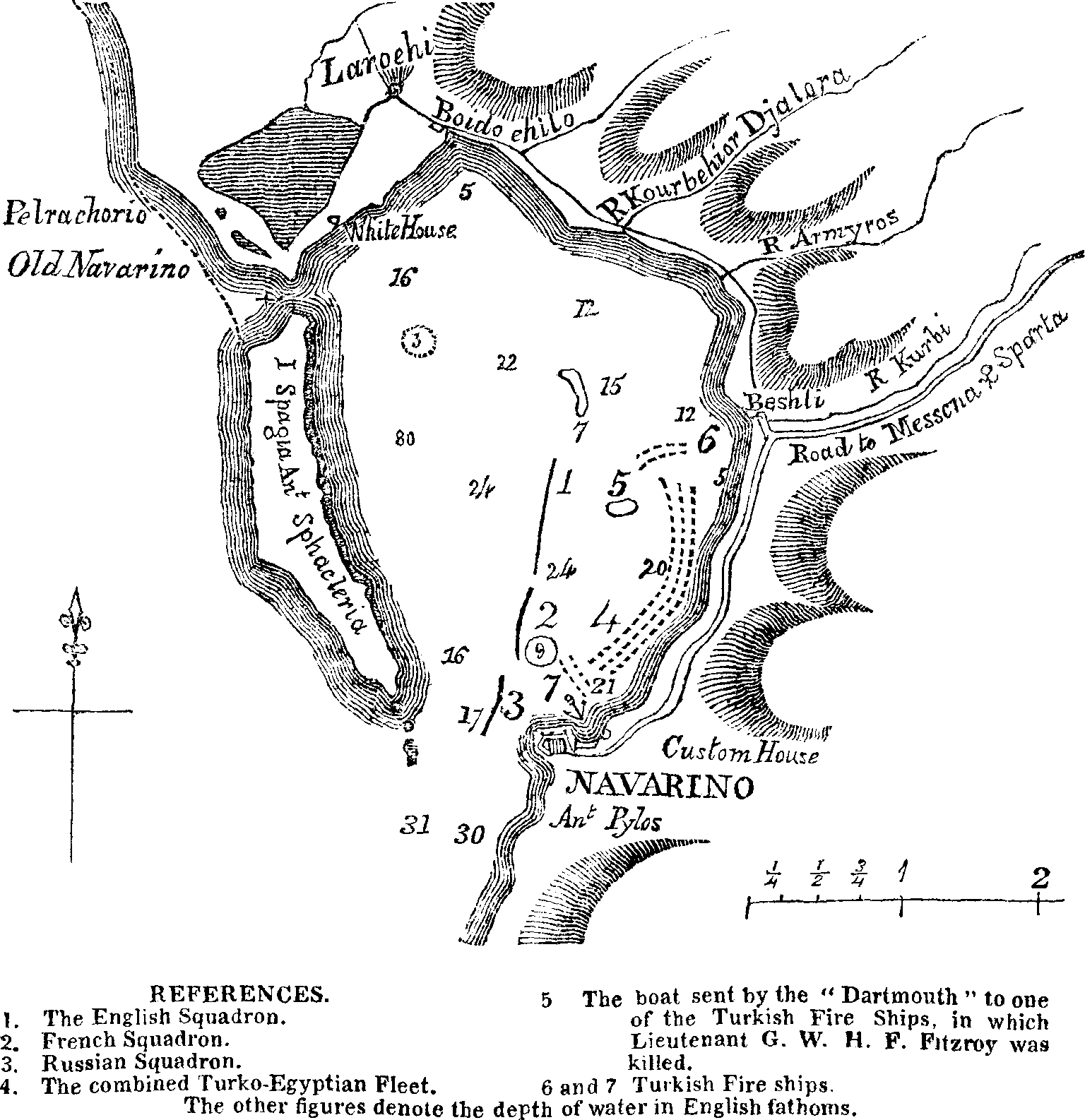
Map of Navarino Bay. The diagram of the order of battle contains inaccuracies

Vice-Admiral Codrington's instructions were to impose and enforce an armistice on both sides and to interdict the flow of reinforcements and supplies from Asia Minor and Egypt to Ottoman forces in Greece. He was to use force only as a last resort.

On 29 August, the Ottomans formally rejected the Treaty of London's stipulations, triggering the dispatch of Allied representatives to Nafplion. On 2 September, the Greek provisional government accepted the armistice. This freed Codrington to concentrate on coercing the Ottoman side.

Navarino Bay is a large natural harbour on the west coast of Messinia in the south-west Peloponnese. It is approximately 5 km long (between the headlands) and 3 km wide. The bay is sheltered from the open sea by a long, narrow islet, Sphacteria. This islet leaves two entrances to the bay. Because of a sandbank, the northern one is very narrow and shallow, 100 m wide and just 1 m deep in places, impassable to large boats. The southern one is much wider, 1,500 m, with an effective passage of 1,000 m width because of rocks. The southern entrance was at that time guarded by the Ottoman-held New Navarino fortress (Pylos). During the Greek insurgency, the bay was used by the Ottoman navy as its main operational base in the Peloponnese.

A large Ottoman–Egyptian fleet, which had been warned by the British and French to stay away from Greece, left Alexandria on 5 August 1827 and joined other Ottoman units at Navarino on 8 September. In response, Codrington arrived with his squadron off Navarino on 12 September. In talks on 25 September with Ibrahim Pasha and the Ottoman admiral, he extracted no explicit verbal promises that they would cease offensive operation. However, Codrington did get the pasha to commit a ceasefire until further instructions from the sultan were given. After these talks, Codrington withdrew to the nearby British-controlled Ionian island of Zante (Zakynthos), leaving a frigate off Navarino to keep watch on the Ottoman fleet.

But the Ottomans soon violated these understandings. Ibrahim was outraged that, while he was expected to observe a ceasefire, Codrington seemingly allowed the Greeks to continue military operations on his vessels unhindered. The Greeks' British commanders were on the offensive at the entrance of the strategically vital Gulf of Corinth. Church's army laid siege to the Ottoman-held port of Patras, while Cochrane organised a revolt behind Ottoman lines in Epirus. By sea, Frank Abney Hastings, a former British naval officer now serving with the Greeks, used a steam-powered warship, the Karteria, to launch a daring night raid on 29/30 September at Itea on the northern shore of the gulf, sinking nine Ottoman gunboats. The problem for Codrington was that these officers were acting on their own initiative, largely ignoring the often contradictory directives of their employer, the Greek provisional government. Recognising that appeals to the latter were ineffective, Codrington despatched aides directly to the British commanders to demand that they cease operations, but with little result.

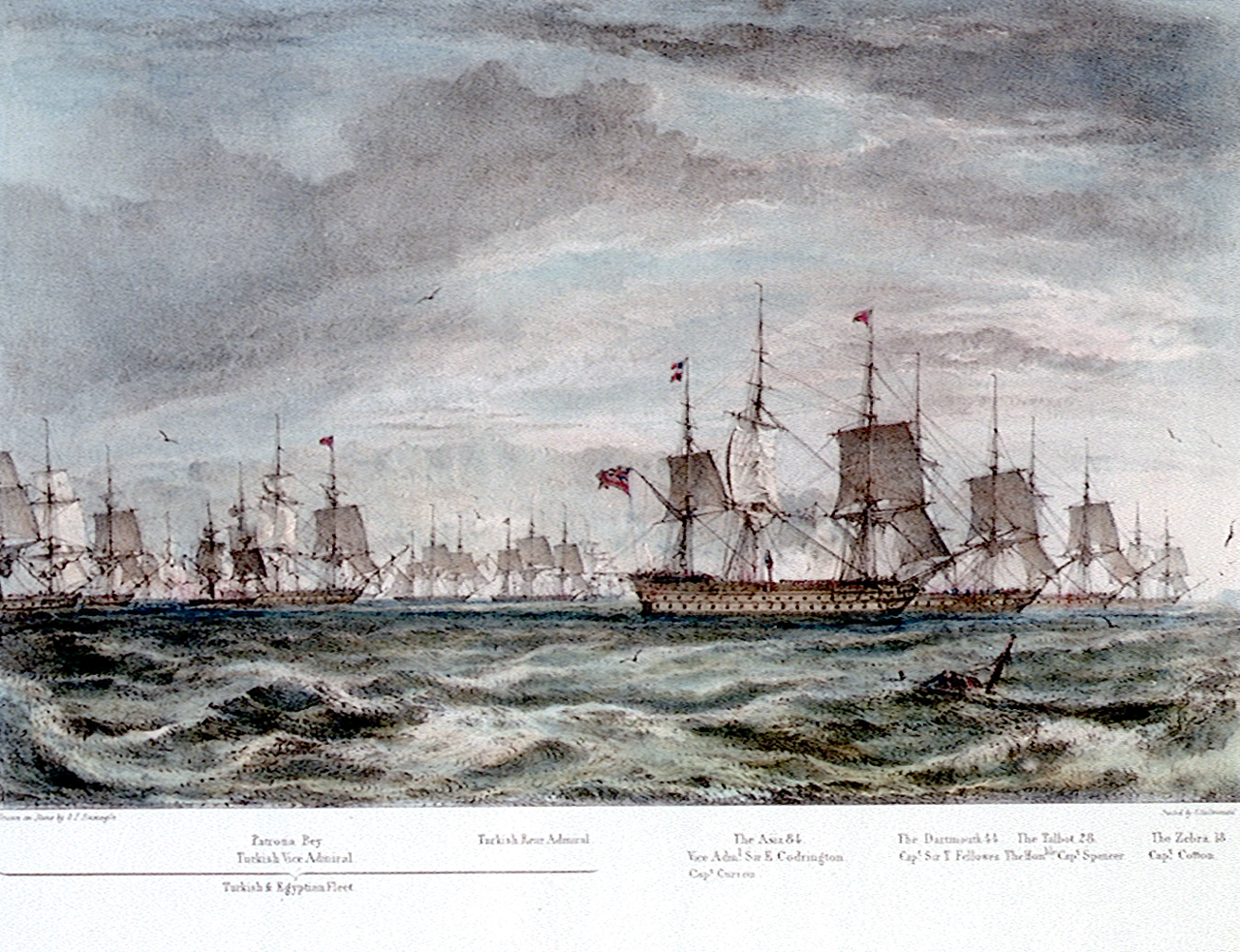
Codrington's squadron prevents the Ottoman reinforcements from reaching Patras on 4 October.

After a vain protest to Codrington, Ibrahim decided to act. On 1 October, he despatched a naval squadron to reinforce the Patras garrison. It was intercepted by Codrington's squadron at the entrance to the gulf, and forced to return to Navarino, shadowed by Codrington. Ibrahim tried again on the night of 3/4 October, this time leading the squadron in person. Using the darkness, he succeeded in slipping past the British picket ship unobserved, but was prevented from entering the gulf by a strong headwind. His squadron was obliged to anchor in the lee of Cape Pappas and wait out the storm. This gave Codrington time to catch up, and the British squadron, after a whole day of fighting the wind, arrived off Pappas on the evening of 4 October. Codrington fired a series of warning broadsides, and Ibrahim reluctantly decided to turn back.

In the meantime, Ibrahim's scorched-earth policy continued unabated on land. The fires of burning villages and fields were clearly visible from Allied ships standing offshore. A British landing party reported that the population of Messinia was close to mass starvation.

On 13 October, Codrington was joined off Navarino by a French squadron under Rigny and a Russian squadron under L. van Heiden. On 18 October, after futile attempts to contact Ibrahim Pasha, Codrington, in conference with his Allied colleagues, took the fateful decision to enter Navarino Bay and anchor his ships face-to-face with the Ottoman/Egyptian fleet. It was decided that with winter approaching, it was impracticable to maintain an effective blockade of Navarino, and that in any event, the population of the Peloponnese had to be safeguarded. Although this was a highly provocative act, Codrington claimed that there was no intention to engage in battle, but only to make a show of force to induce the Ottomans to respect the armistice and to desist from atrocities against the civilian population.

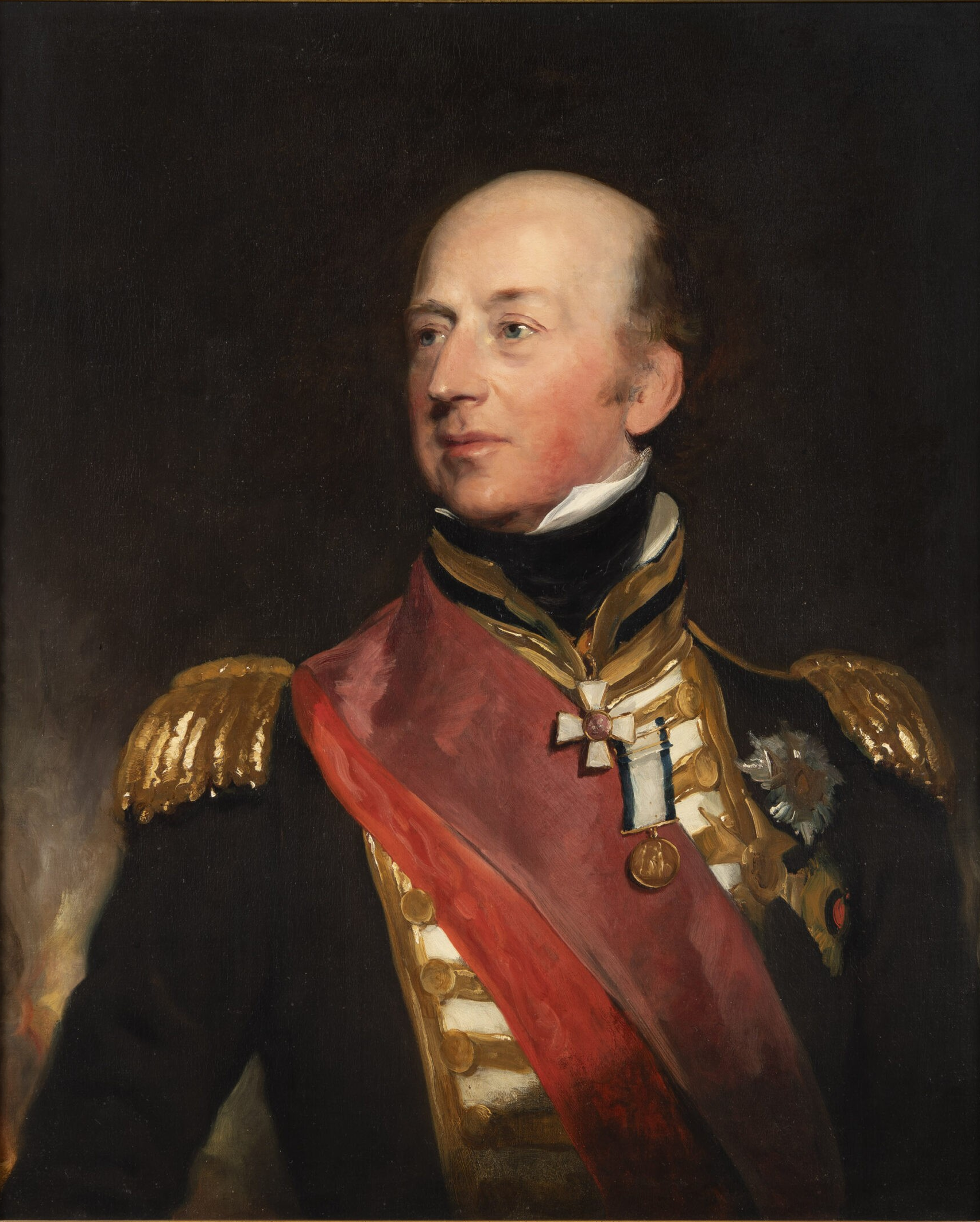
Portrait of Edward Codrington by Thomas Lawrence. Vice-Admiral Sir Edward Codrington, Allied commander-in-chief at the Battle of Navarino

=== Strength of the two fleets ===
==== Allies ====
The Allied navies at this time were still deploying essentially the same technology as during the Napoleonic Wars: sailing ships, unarmoured wooden hulls and muzzle-loading smoothbore cannon. The navies, especially the British one, had ignored the new technologies that were to transform them by the 1850s: steam propulsion, ironclad hulls, rifled guns and explosive shells. All these had been invented by 1827, but their development for naval warfare, let alone introduction, met dogged resistance from senior naval echelons. In the words of one scholar: "The great admirals of the 18th century would have had no difficulty in taking over Codrington's command at short notice."

However, the Royal Navy's warships had seen some improvements. Ships with triple gun-decks such as Nelson's famous HMS Victory had been phased out. Triple-deckers had been found to be too unstable and difficult to manoeuvre. The standard Canopus-class was a double-deck 74–84 ship of the line, based on the successful "74" French design. In addition, gun-calibres had been upgraded. The Napoleonic-era Fame-class had been equipped with 32-pounders on the main gun-deck, 18-pounders on the upper deck and 9- and 12-pounders on the super-structures (quarterdeck and forecastle). In contrast, the guns were now all 24- or 32-pounders (plus a couple of massive 68-pounder carronades on the super-structures). Frigates were either double-deckers of 50–60 guns (known as large frigates) or single-deckers with 24–44 guns.

Most of the Allied ships, however, were still veteran Napoleonic-era warhorses (e.g. HMS Albion). Codrington's only Canopus-class was his flagship, HMS Asia (launched 1824), although Genoa (an impounded French "74") was also post-Napoleonic (1816). In the French squadron, Rigny was so appalled by the state of the three ships of the line sent to him that he decided to keep his flag on the Sirène, a modern frigate.

==== Ottomans ====
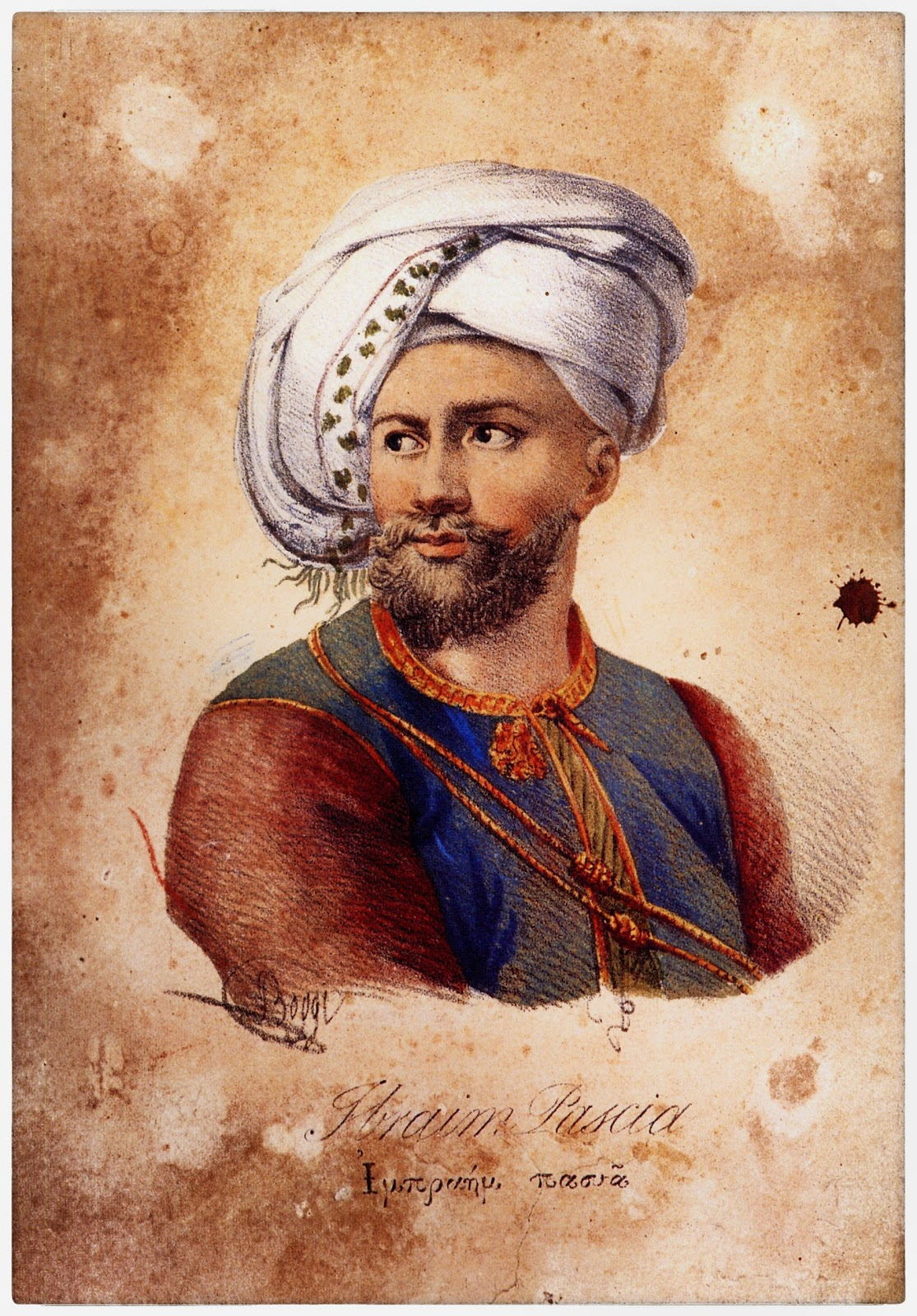
Ibrahim Pasha, the commander of the Egyptian expedition to the Peloponnese. The atrocities committed by his forces against the Greek population made him one of the most reviled figures in Europe.

Overall at Navarino, the Allies had 22 ships and 1,258 guns against the Ottomans' 78 ships with 2,180 guns (figures exclude smaller boats and fireships). But the numbers masked major Allied advantages in ship-types, gun-calibres and crew quality. As a result of these, Allied gun-crews could fire more powerful, more frequent and more accurate cannonades than their Ottoman counterparts.

The Allies had a substantial superiority in front-line combat vessels: 10 ships of the line to the Ottomans' three. This advantage was only partially offset by the Ottomans' seven double-deck frigates against one Allied vessel of this kind. The great majority of the Ottoman–Egyptian fleet were smaller vessels – 58 corvettes and brigs – which were of little use against the Allied heavyweights: they had much smaller firepower, and, their decks being lower, could easily be dismasted by raking fire. In addition, the Ottoman–Egyptians mainly deployed smaller-calibre guns than the Allies (often the guns discarded by the Allies when they upgraded their own calibres). Most of the Allied crews had gained extensive combat experience in the Napoleonic Wars, which had only ended 12 years previously, and were service professionals. In contrast, the Ottoman crews only had combat experience against the Greek revolutionary naval forces, which although gallant and effective, bore no resemblance to the navies of the Great Powers. In many cases, Ottoman crews practiced impressment to fill their ships' complements. Some Ottoman crew were even found, after the battle, to have been shackled at their posts (convicts, Greek prisoners or other involuntary recruits).

The Egyptian contingent, the largest and best-equipped of the Ottoman fleet at Navarino, had been trained by a team of French officers, under the overall direction of Capt J-M. Letellier. These officers acted as "shadow-captains" of the large Egyptian vessels, each advising the nominal Egyptian captain. The day before the battle, Rigny persuaded these officers to withdraw from the Egyptian fleet so as to avoid the possibility of fighting against their own navy (they moved to an Austrian brig that was in the bay, ostensibly neutral but in reality providing logistical support for Ottoman operations). Letellier himself was sick and also took no part. This deprived the Egyptians of experienced command.

For the Allies, probably the Ottomans' most dangerous weapon were their fireships. These had long been deployed to devastating effect by the Greek revolutionaries against the Ottomans, who had learnt how to use them through hard experience. Fireships were posted on the wings of the Ottoman formation, and could, if effectively deployed, wreak mayhem on Allied boats concentrated in enclosed waters, especially as Allied sailors had no experience of this kind of warfare. The danger was graphically demonstrated in the early phase of the battle, when the French ship of the line Scipion narrowly escaped being destroyed by a fireship.

The Ottomans possessed a shore battery on each side of the main entrance to the bay, in Navarino fort and on the southern tip of Sphacteria island. These could have seriously impeded Allied entry into the bay, but Codrington was clearly confident that the Ottomans would not start a shooting war. (Or, in an alternative interpretation, he hoped that they would, to give him an excuse to destroy the Ottoman fleet.)

=== Strategies for battle ===
Following an elaborate defensive plan proposed by Letellier, the Ottoman-Egyptian fleet was anchored in a horseshoe formation, in three lines, extending from Navarino fort to the southern tip of Sphacteria island, where the Ottoman shore battery lay. The front line consisted of the ships of the line and large frigates; the second line contained the remaining frigates and larger corvettes; the third consisted of the remaining smaller vessels. The idea was that the smaller vessels could fire through the gaps in the frontline, whilst being protected by the larger ships from Allied attack. On the ends of the horseshoe were stationed corvettes and fireships. The latter could be towed by boats into position covered by the smaller corvettes and shore batteries.

The Allied plan was to anchor in the free water inside the crescent. Codrington's squadron would take up position facing the centre of the Ottoman line; the French and Russian squadrons would face the Ottoman left and right wings respectively. The French position in the line had been specifically determined so that they would face the Egyptian fleet, which had been trained by the French and might be reluctant to fight against Egypt's closest European ally. In conventional naval doctrine, Codrington's plan would have been regarded as an unacceptable risk, as it would have invited the enemy to try to surround the Allies. Furthermore, with the prevailing wind blowing from the SW, straight up the entrance, Codrington risked becoming trapped, unable to extricate his squadrons quickly if necessary. The adoption of this high-risk plan shows the total confidence of the Allied commanders in the tactical superiority of their vessels.

=== Engagement ===
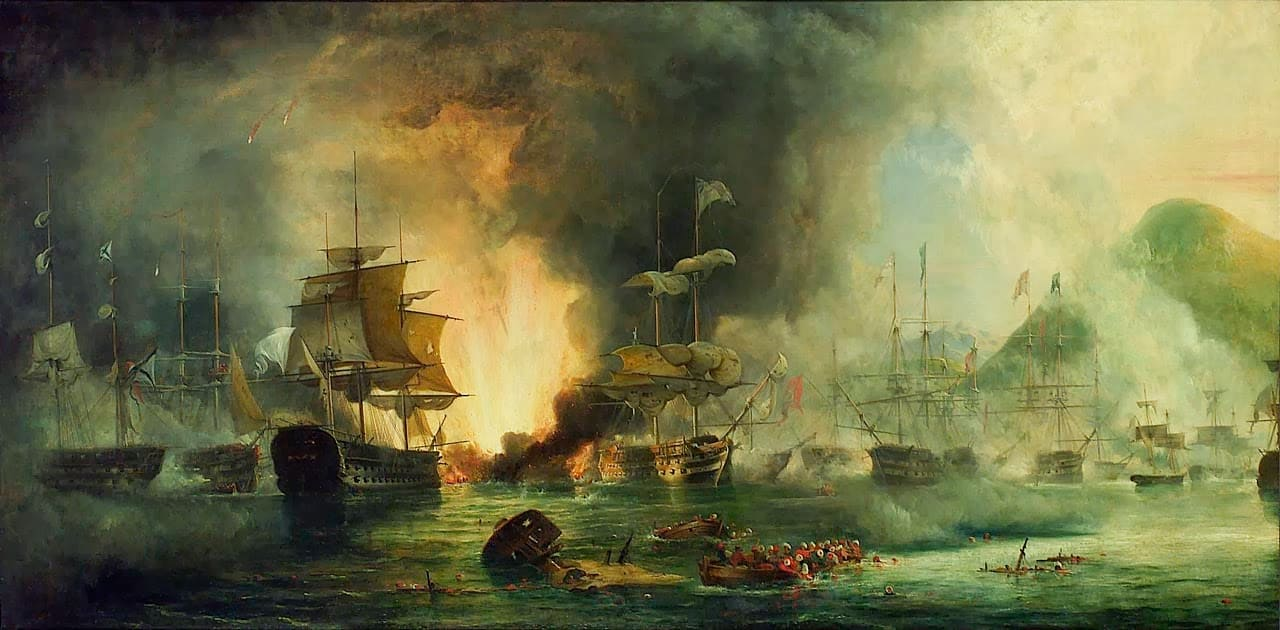
The Battle of Navarino by George Philip Reinagle, 1828

At 1.30 p.m., on 20 October 1827, off the entrance to Navarino Bay, Codrington signalled to the Allied fleet: "PREPARE FOR ACTION" and Allied crews were ordered to stand to their guns. Gun-ports were left half-open, but Allied captains were under strict orders to open fire only if attacked. At 2.00 p.m., Allied warships, with Codrington in the lead in Asia, began filing into the bay through the southern entrance, proceeding in two lines, British followed by French to starboard (SE, closest to Navarino) and Russians to port abreast but slightly behind the French. There was no attempt to prevent their entry by the Ottoman shore batteries or their corvettes posted at the entrance, but Codrington received a launch carrying a message from Ibrahim Pasha. This stated that he had not given permission for the Allies to enter the bay, and demanded that they withdraw. Codrington dismissed Ibrahim's objection, replying that he had come to give orders, not to take them. He warned that if the Ottomans opened fire, their fleet would be destroyed.

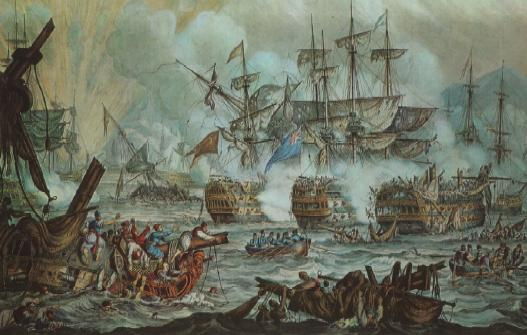
Action at close quarters during the battle. This detail shows Codrington's flagship, HMS Asia (centre, flying Blue Ensign), simultaneously demolishing two Ottoman flagships

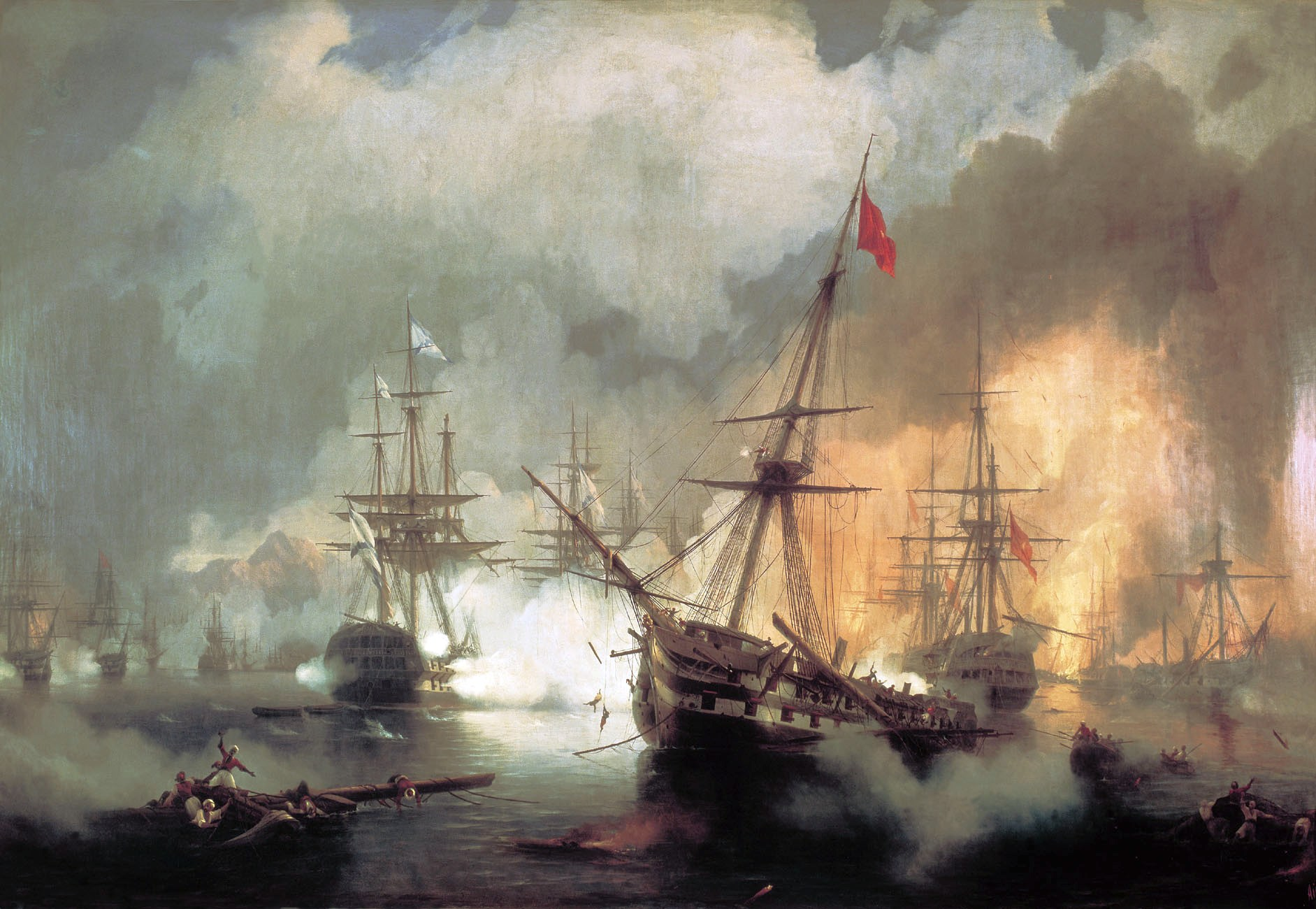
Battle of Navarino, by Ivan Aivazovsky, showing the Russian squadron, in line ahead (left-centre, white flags with blue transversal crosses) bombarding the Ottoman fleet (right, with red flags)

As his flagship dropped anchor in the middle of the Ottoman line, Codrington ordered a brass band to play on deck to emphasize his peaceful intentions. By 2.15 p.m., the three British ships of the line had dropped anchor in their allotted positions. Meanwhile, as the Allied vessels moved into position, along the Ottoman lines trumpets sounded action stations. Ottoman crews scrambled to meet the unexpected intrusion into their base.

At this point, at the entrance, fighting broke out. Codrington claimed that hostilities were started by the Ottomans. The outbreak, according to Allied sources, occurred in the following manner:

At the entrance to the bay, Capt Thomas Fellowes on the frigate Dartmouth had been detailed, with six smaller vessels (2 brigs and 4 schooners) to keep watch on the group of Ottoman corvettes and fireships on the left flank of the Ottoman line. As the Allied ships continued moving into the bay, Fellowes noticed that an Ottoman crew was preparing a fireship and sent a boat to instruct them to desist. The Ottomans fired on the boat and lighted the fireship. Fellowes sent a cutter to tow the fireship to a safe distance, but the Ottomans fired on the cutter, inflicting casualties. Fellowes opened musket fire on the fireship crew to cover his men. At this point the French flagship Sirène, which was just then entering the bay on the tail of the British-French line, opened fire with muskets to support Dartmouth. An Ottoman corvette then attacked Sirène with its guns. This chain reaction spread along the line, so that within a short time, there was general engagement.

The battle thus began before the Allies could complete their deployment. In fact, this proved to be a tactical advantage, as it meant some Allied ships were not yet at anchor and could therefore manoeuvre more swiftly. Nevertheless, most ships fought at anchor. There was naturally very little scope for manoeuvre, except to change the orientation of the ship by hauling on the springs on the anchor chains. With ships blasting each other at very close range, the encounter was mostly a matter of attrition, in which superior Allied firepower and gunnery were critical.

Combat action may be summarised as follows:

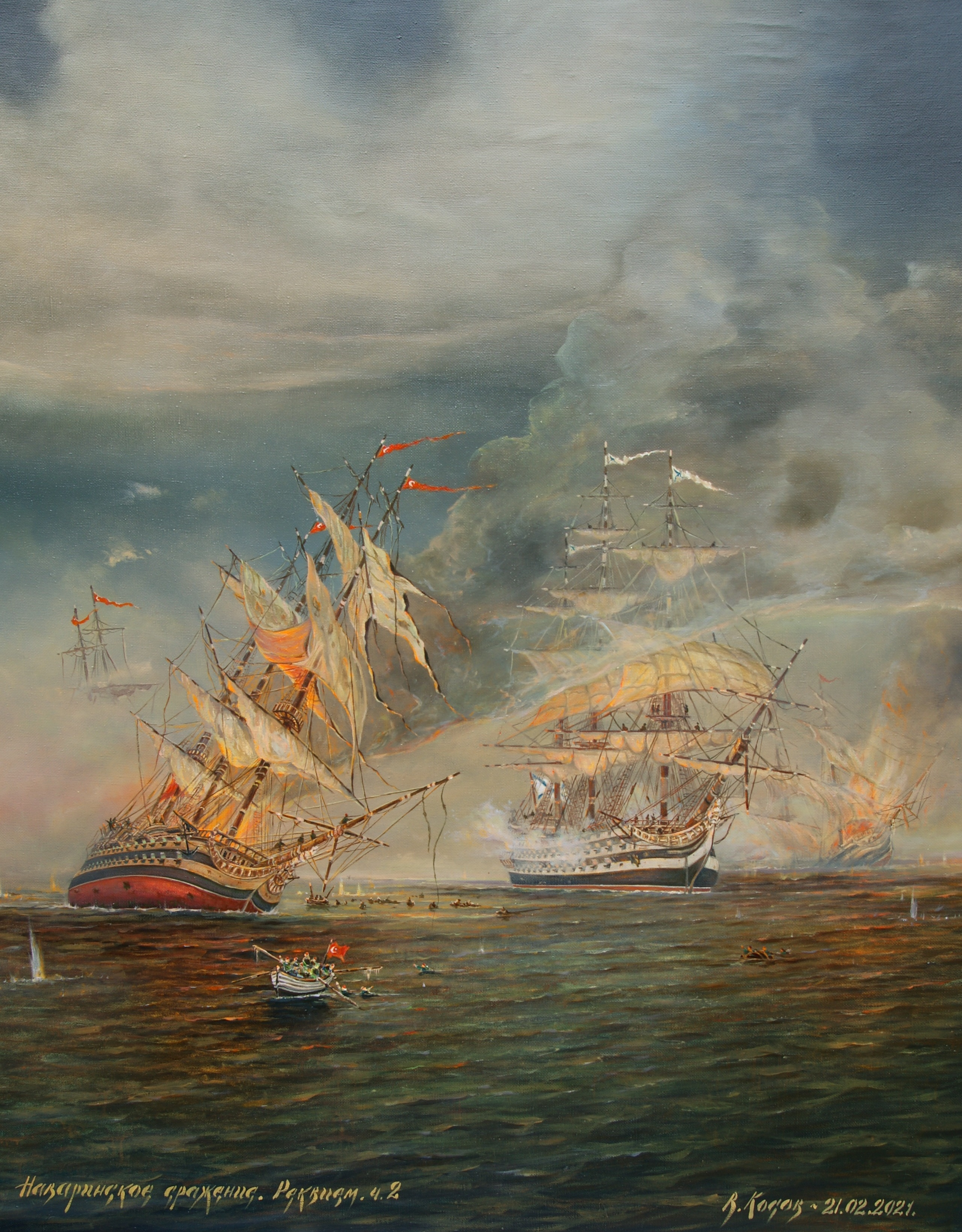
Battle of Navarino. Vladimir Kosov

1. The French ship Scipion (80 guns), behind Rigny's Sirène (60), immediately came under intense attack, by a combination of Egyptian frigates on both sides, the shore batteries and a fireship. The latter was nearly fatal. The fireship jammed under Scipion's bowsprit, the fore sails caught fire and the fire spread onto the upper gun-deck. Men flung themselves on the fire to prevent it spreading to the forward powder magazine, with inevitable horrendous burn injuries. Nevertheless, the gunners continued to fire on the attackers. Scipion was saved from destruction by her sister ship Trident (74), which succeeded in attaching a tow-line to the fireship and, with the assistance of Dartmouth and two other British boats, pulling it clear.
2. Rigny's Sirène fought a lengthy duel with the 64-gun frigate Ihsania, which finally blew up. Sirène suffered significant casualties and damage. Sirène, with the support of Trident and Scipion, then bombarded the fort of Navarino and eventually silenced its shore battery.
3. The captain of French Breslaw (84), Captain Botherel de La Bretonnière, seeing that Rigny did not need further support, decided on his own initiative to break away from the French formation and move into the centre of the bay, at the junction of the British and Russian lines, to reinforce British Albion (74) and Russian Azov (80). Both were hard pressed. Albion, which had wrecked an Ottoman frigate as she anchored, was under fire from all three Ottoman ships of the line simultaneously. Fortunately for her, the enemy gunnery was inept. Even so, Breslaw's intervention was later acknowledged by the captain of Albion as having saved his ship from annihilation. Breslaw then proceeded to play a leading role in the destruction of Ottoman admiral Tahir Pasha's flagship, the Ghiuh Rewan (84), and at least four frigates.
4. Codrington's Asia (84) was anchored between Ottoman admiral Capitan Bey's flagship, Fahti Bahri (74), and Egyptian Moharram Bey's frigate Guerrière (60). Capitan Bey opened fire, but Moharram Bey sent word to Codrington that he was not going to attack. This enabled Asia to concentrate its fire on Fahti Bahri, which was in a poor condition and inadequately manned. Asia's deadly fire shortly disabled her. Codrington then sent an interpreter, a Greek, P. Mikelis, to parley with Moharram Bey; but Mikelis was shot dead as he went aboard. Guerrière then opened fire, but was reduced to a burning wreck within 20 minutes by crushing broadsides from Asia and Azov. However, Asia suffered severe casualties and damage due to a concentration of heavy fire from smaller Ottoman boats in the second and third lines of the Ottoman formation: as Letellier had planned, these boats fired through the gaps in the front line. Codrington also believed that Asia had taken serious hits by mistake from sister Genoa.
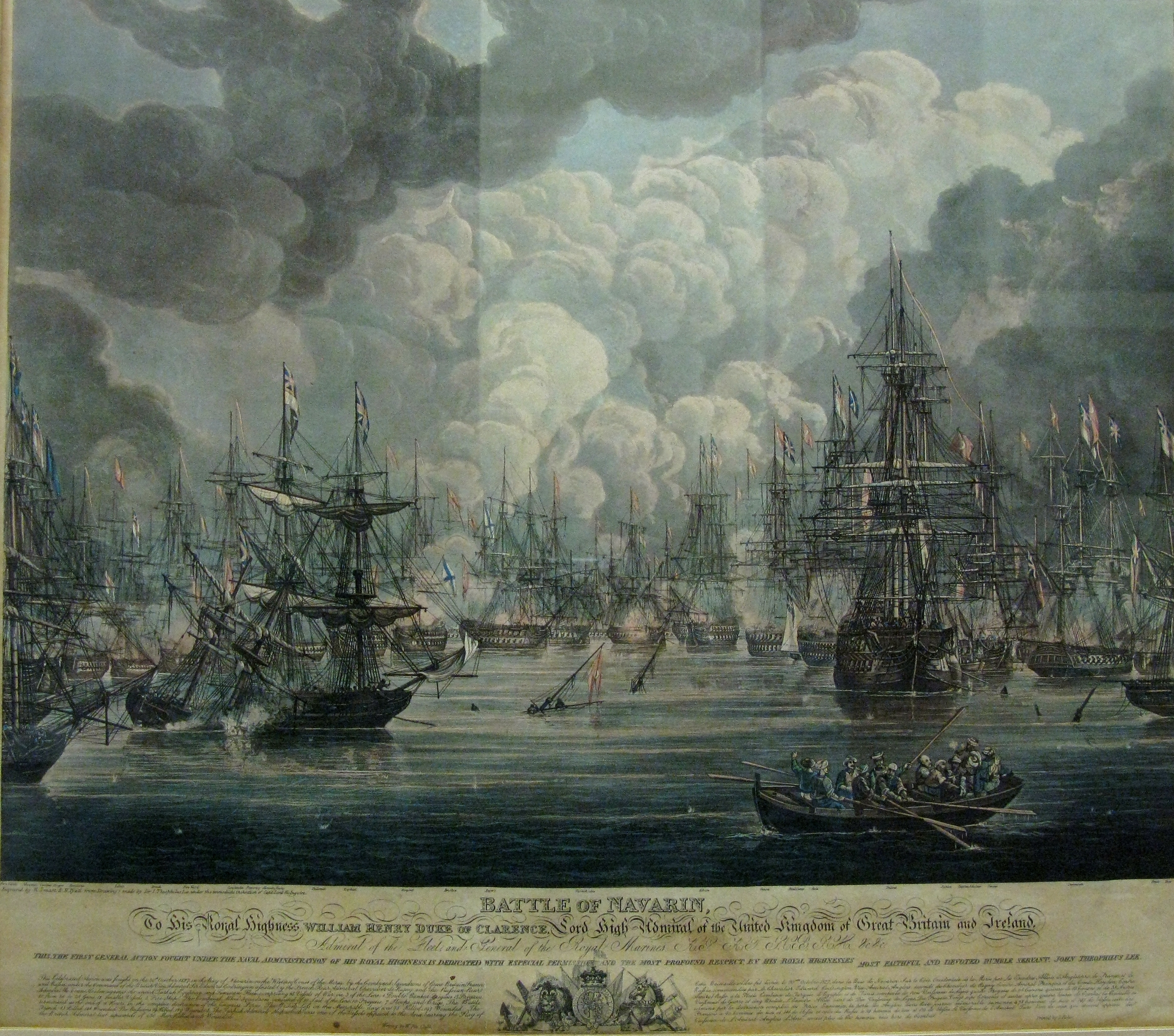
  Battle of Navarin, National Historical Museum, Athens, Greece
5. The Russians under Van Heiden were the last to take up station, as was planned. Their position, on the right end of the Ottoman crescent, was the most exposed. The fighting in this sector was even more intense than elsewhere. Azov sank or disabled three large frigates and a corvette, but herself took 153 hits, several below the waterline.
6. The British frigates Armide and Talbot initially had to face the frigates on the Ottoman right wing and the island shore battery unsupported, as the other two frigates were away and arrived later. They were saved from annihilation by the arrival of the Russian frigates.
7. The smaller British and French vessels (brigs and the schooners Alcyone and Daphné), under the overall direction of frigate Dartmouth, had been allotted the vital task of preventing fireship attacks. Their success was complete: apart from the initial fireship attack on Scipion, not a single fireship struck a target during the battle. A number of the smaller vessels greatly distinguished themselves, suffering casualties as great, in proportion, as the ships of the line.

By about 4 p.m., all three Ottoman ships of the line and most of the large frigates of the first line had been despatched. This left the mass of smaller vessels in the second and third lines at the mercy of the Allied ships of the line, all of which were still operational. During the ensuing massacre, Codrington tried twice to order a ceasefire, but his signals were either invisible because of the thick smoke or ignored in the heat of the battle. Within the following two hours, virtually the entire Ottoman fleet was destroyed, despite the signal bravery of the Ottoman crews, which was praised by Codrington himself in his despatches. Three quarters were sunk: many of them, dismasted but still afloat and reparable, were blown up or set on fire by their own crews to prevent them falling into Allied hands.

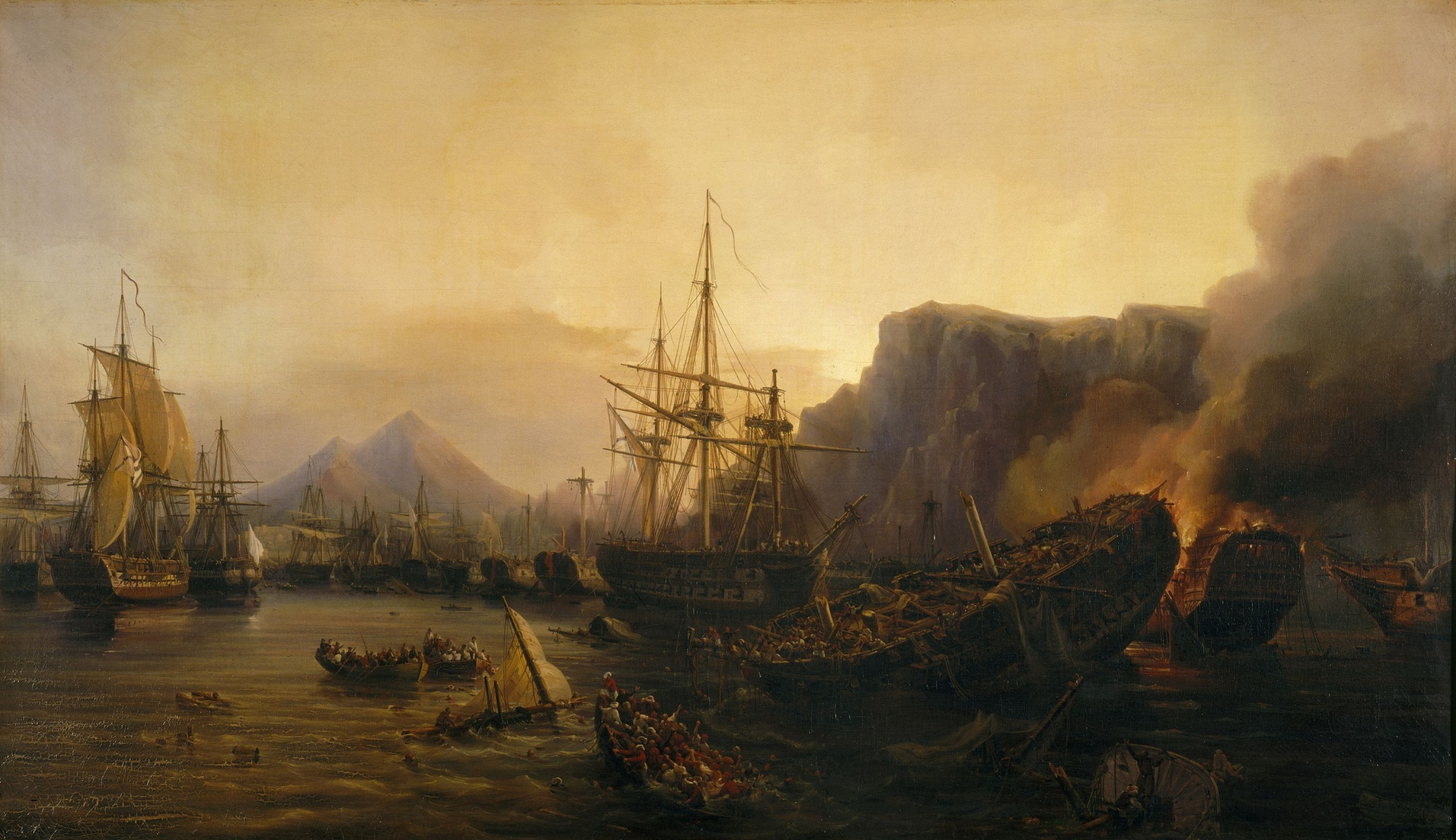
Burning and beached hulks of Ottoman warships under the cliffs of Navarino. Painting by Auguste Mayer

This contributed to the horrendous Ottoman and Egyptian casualty figures, as many men were trapped in burning or exploding vessels. Some, as mentioned, were shackled to their posts. Ottoman casualties given to Codrington by Letellier were approx. 3,000 killed, 1,109 wounded, although Codrington claimed the reverse was more likely. Of the entire Ottoman-Egyptian armada of 78 vessels, just eight remained seaworthy: one dismasted ship of the line, two frigates, and five corvettes.

Allied casualties were given by Codrington as 181 killed, 480 wounded (including Codrington's youngest son, midshipman H. Codrington, serving on Asia under his father, who was badly injured but made a full recovery). Several Allied ships were severely damaged: the Russian ships Azov, Gangut and Iezekiil were disabled. The three British ships of the line had to be sent back to the United Kingdom for repairs. According to one source, despite the rough handling all the ships of the line had endured and the danger from exploding Ottoman vessels, not a single Allied vessel was sunk.

As the guns fell silent at dusk in Navarino Bay, news of the outcome raced over the Peloponnese and to the rest of Greece. In village after village, church bells started a continuous peal in the night. People rushed into village squares, to be greeted by the news that the Ottoman Sultan and his hated vassal Ibrahim Pasha no longer possessed a Mediterranean fleet. In a maritime country like Greece, the implication was evident—the fledgling Greek state was saved. Wild rejoicing broke out, and lasted through the night and for days after. Huge bonfires were lit on the mountaintops of the Peloponnese and Mount Parnassos in central Greece. Celebrations swept even the occupied regions, which the demoralised Ottoman garrisons made little effort to prevent.

== Aftermath ==
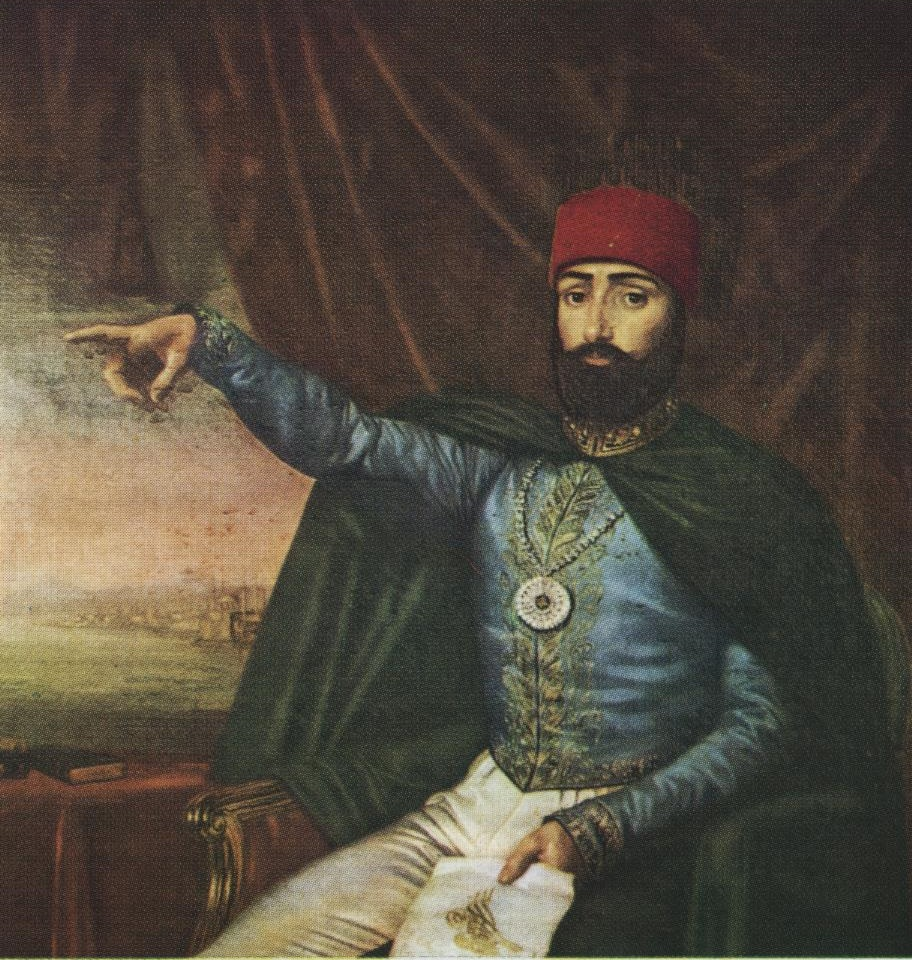
Mahmud II, Ottoman sultan 1808–39, who struggled for eight years to defeat the Greek Revolution, ultimately in vain

Despite the celebrations, the Sultan still disposed of a total of around 40,000 troops in central and southern Greece, entrenched in powerful fortresses. The final liberation of Greece was still far off, unless the Ottomans could be induced to accept the Treaty of London.

Russia's long-expected declaration of war on the Ottomans occurred in April 1828, starting the 11th Russo-Turkish War (1828–1829). A Russian army of 100,000 men swept aside the Ottoman forces in the Romanian Principalities, crossed the Danube, and laid siege to Silistra, Varna and Shumla, the key Ottoman-held fortresses in Rumelia (Bulgaria).

In August 1828, Ali agreed to the withdrawal of his forces from the Peloponnese. Ibrahim initially refused to comply with his father's evacuation orders, but gave way shortly after the French troops landed in Navarino Bay at the end of August, to a jubilant reception by the Greeks, to begin their Morea expedition. The Egyptians finally left in October 1828, a year after the naval battle. The French proceeded to clear the remaining Ottoman garrisons in the Peloponnese, which offered only token resistance, by the end of 1828. In the subsequent months, Greek forces regained control of central Greece in a lightning campaign.

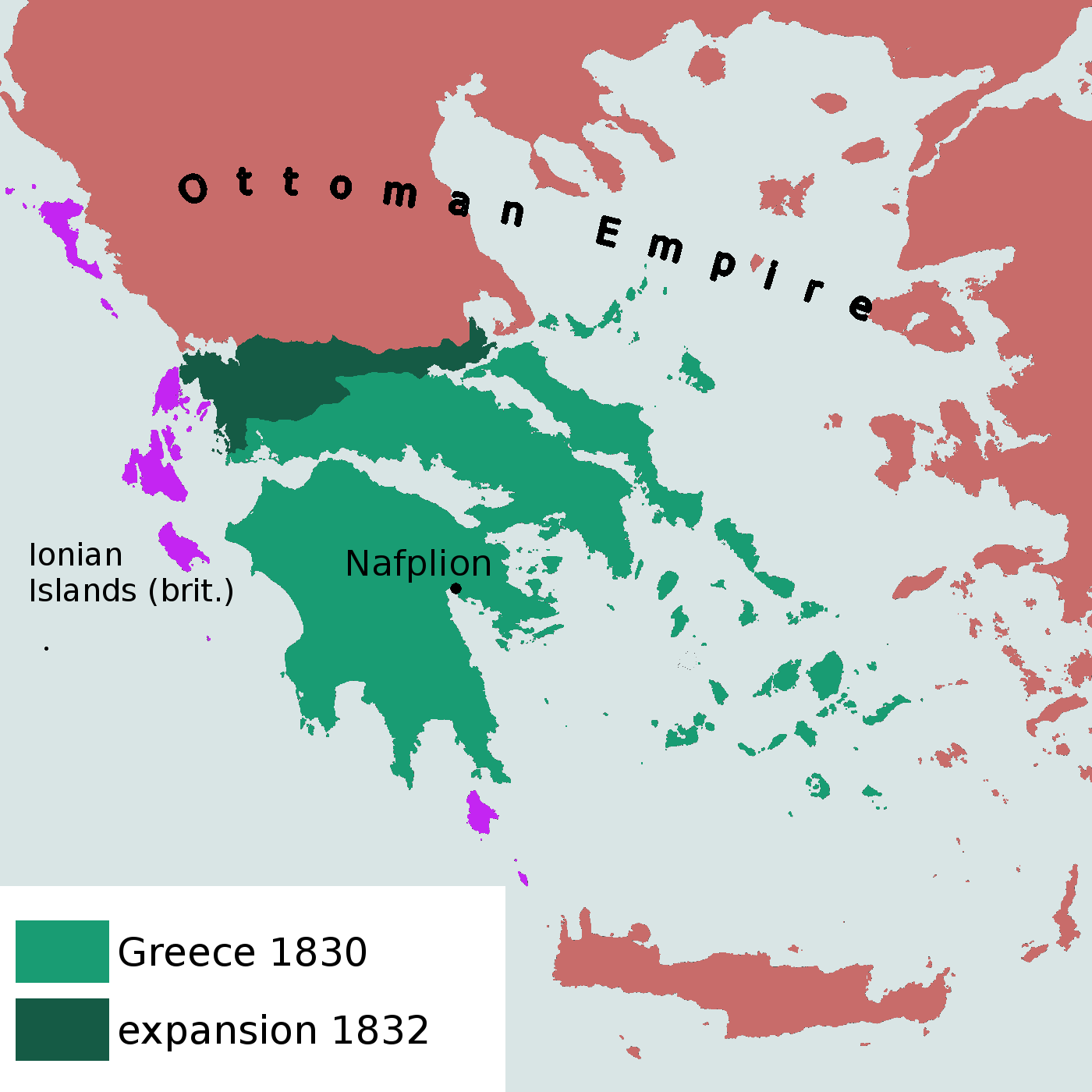
The modern Greek state (then the Kingdom of Greece) was established at the London Conference in 1832

In September 1829, with the Russian army camped just 40 miles from his palace, the Ottoman Sultan was forced to capitulate. By the Treaty of Adrianople, he conceded a long list of Russian demands, one of which was acceptance of Greek autonomy as defined in the Treaty of London. However, the Sultan's acceptance came too late to save Ottoman sovereignty over Greece. Buoyed by the Ottoman disasters on land and sea, and their own military successes, the Greeks refused to accept anything less than full independence. Finally, at the London Protocol of 1830, the Allies dropped their policy of Ottoman suzerainty and accepted Greek independence. Later that year, the Sultan was forced by the Allied powers to sign the Treaty of Constantinople (1832), formally recognizing the new Kingdom of Greece as an independent state.

== Codrington controversy ==
In the aftermath of Navarino, Codrington pressed for an Egyptian withdrawal from the Peloponnese, but it took a year to achieve it. The news of Navarino made Codrington a hero twice over in the eyes of the general British public. But in Whitehall, senior naval and diplomatic echelons were appalled by the outcome of his campaign. It was considered that Codrington had grossly exceeded his instructions by provoking a showdown with the Ottoman fleet, and that his actions had gravely compromised the Ottoman ability to resist Russian encroachment. At a social event, King George IV was reported as referring to the battle as "this untoward [i.e., undesirable] event". Codrington's political situation in London became even more precarious in January 1828, when Wellington became Prime Minister. The coincident launch of Tsar Nicholas's war on the Ottomans realised the worst fears of British policy-makers and deepened their anger at Codrington.

Initially, official disapproval of Codrington had to be restrained because of the admiral's huge popularity with the public. The Admiralty's revenge took petty form, such as its refusal, despite repeated requests by Codrington, to pay his crews their traditional prize money from the sale of captured Ottoman treasure and goods. Meanwhile, Wellington was biding his time until he felt it was politically safe to remove Codrington from the Mediterranean theatre. Finally, in June 1828, the Admiralty announced that Codrington was being relieved of his command (although he remained in acting-command until his replacement arrived in August). Although the King felt obliged by public opinion to grant Codrington the high honour of the Grand Cross of the Bath, the Admiralty's failure to give him another operational command in his remaining decade of service was eloquent testimony to his fall from favour.

Codrington spent much time in his later years defending his actions in Greece. His enemies accused him of deliberately plotting the destruction of the Ottoman fleet because of his Hellenophile sympathies, a charge that Codrington vehemently denied. The issue turned on whether he knew that his move into Navarino Bay would result in a battle. The evidence is mixed. On the one hand, there are Codrington's clear orders to his captains to engage only if attacked. On the other, is Codrington's private correspondence, notably to his sister, which suggests that he regarded a military showdown as inevitable.

== Commemoration of the battle ==
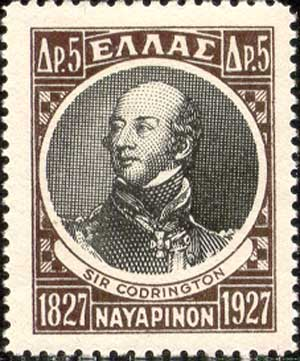
Greek stamp issued in 1927 on the 100th anniversary of the Battle of Navarino.

There are a number of memorials to the battle around Navarino Bay. The main square of Pylos, Three Admirals' Square (Greek: Πλατεία Τριών Ναυάρχων), has as its centrepiece a three-sided marble monument, with profiles of Codrington, Van Heiden, and Rigny on the three sides.

Memorials to the dead of the three allies are to be found on the islands in the bay: Helonaki islet (British), Pylos islet (French), and Sphacteria island (Russian). The Russian memorial is the most impressive, consisting of a small wooden chapel in the Russian Orthodox style. Additionally, there is a memorial to the philhellene Santarosa, who was killed in an earlier battle, on the shore of Sphacteria.

The battle is commemorated each year on 20 October by all-day celebrations in Three Admirals' Square in Pylos, hosted by the Mayor of Pylos. The Russian, French and British governments send representatives to the ceremonies, and in the case of the Russians, a warship and its crew. It was the source of the name for the Russian corvette Navarin, the Russian battleship Navarin, and the French ship of the line Navarin.

Some bronze from the sunken Ottoman ships was bought by Anton Samassa in Trieste and was in 1834 used for the main bell of St. Judoc's Church in Sveti Jošt near Kranj, Carniola (now Slovenia). It bears an inscription by the Slovene Romantic poet France Prešeren: "My bronze was found at the bottom of the sea, when the kingdom of Turkey was ended in Helade by Navarino. It was bought by a pilgrim; cast into a bell by Samassa, now I announce God's honour from St. Jodocus's embrasures."
