= Russian ship Rostislav =

Several ships of the Russian Navies have been named Rostislav after Rostislav I of Kiev, including:

- Russian ship Rostislav (1844), an 84-gun ship of the line launched in 1844
- Russian battleship Rostislav, a pre-dreadnought battleship launched in 1896
