= Khrabryi-class ship of the line =

Ship of the line class of the Russian Imperial Navy

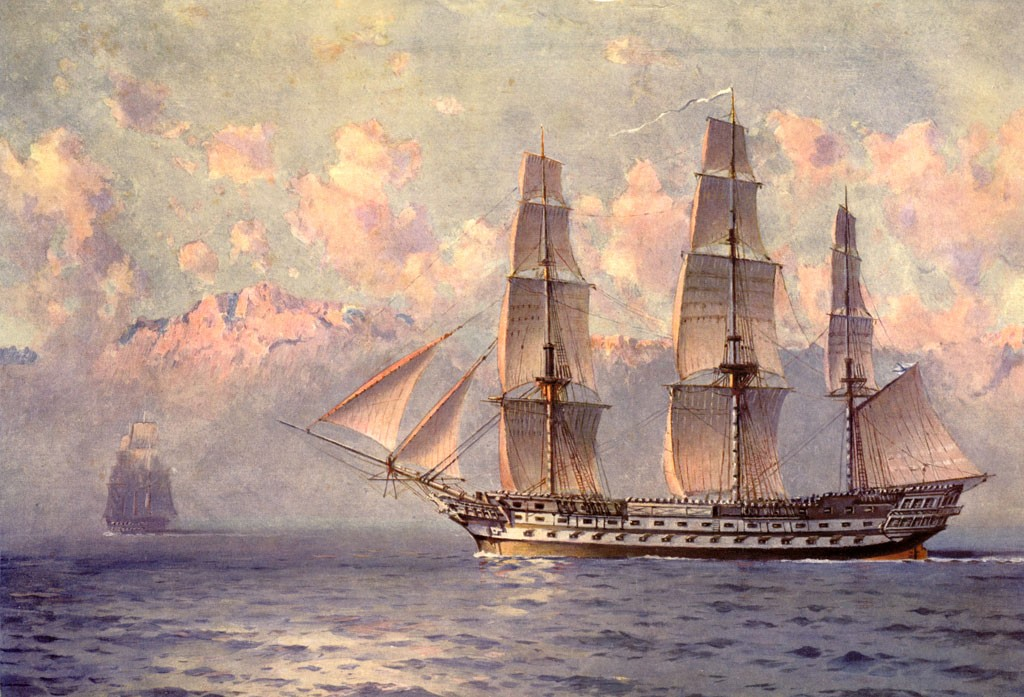
- Imperatritsa Maria under sail, by Alexei Hanzen

Class overview
- Preceded by: Rostislav
- Succeeded by: Chesma
- Completed: 2
- Lost: 2

General characteristics
- Class & type: Ship of the line
- Displacement: 3,890 metric tons (3,830 long tons; 4,290 short tons)
- Length: 196 ft (60 m)
- Beam: 55 ft (17 m)
- Draft: 26 ft 7 in (8.10 m)
- Armament: 28 × 68-pound Paixhans guns; 4 × 36-pound long guns; 32 × 36-pound short guns; 24 × 24-pound gunnades; 2 × 24-pound carronades; 6 × 18-pound carronades; 2 × 12-pound carronades; 2 × 8-pound carronades

The Khrabryi class was a pair of ships of the line built for the Black Sea Fleet of the Imperial Russian Navy in the 1840s and early 1850s. The class comprised two ships: Khrabryi and Imperatritsa Maria. The two ships were built as part of a naval expansion program aimed at strengthening the Black Sea Fleet during a period of increased tension with Britain and France over the continued decline of the Ottoman Empire. Both ships saw active service during the Crimean War, with Imperatritsa Maria serving as Pavel Nakhimov's flagship at the Battle of Sinop in November 1853, where the Russians annihilated an Ottoman squadron. The two ships were withdrawn to Sevastopol after the British and French intervention and were trapped there during the Siege of Sevastopol until 1855, when both were scuttled to block the harbor entrance.

== Design ==
The Ottoman Empire had grown increasingly weak by the 1820s, particularly after a combined French, British, and Russian fleet annihilated an Ottoman fleet at the Battle of Navarino in 1827. The power vacuum increased tension with Britain and France over influence in the region, prompting Russian fears of a conflict with the other two Great Powers. At the time, the British and French navies began to move away from the traditional seventy-four as improved building techniques allowed them to design larger two-decked ships of the line armed with 84 guns while retaining the hull strength of the 74-gun ships. And at the same time, the navy of the Eyalet of Egypt also began to build a powerful fleet. To prepare itself for an anticipated future conflict involving the British, French, Egyptians, or Ottomans, Russia began a construction program in the 1830s to strengthen the Black Sea Fleet that included nine 84-gun ships; unlike the shallower Baltic Sea, ships built for the Black Sea could make use of the deeper draft needed for the larger eighty-fours. The Khrabryi class were among the last of these to be built, and Imperatritsa Maria was the final eighty-four to be completed.

=== Characteristics ===
The ships of the Khrabryi class were 200 feet (61 m) long, with a beam of 56 ft 8 in (17.27 m) and a draft of 24 ft (7.3 m). The ships were given a broad beam to allow them to carry a heavy battery of 68-pound guns on their lower decks. They displaced 4,160 metric tons (4,090 long tons; 4,590 short tons).

The ships carried a different battery of guns. Khrabryi was armed with twenty-eight 68-pounder shell-firing Paixhans guns and four 36-pounder long guns on the lower gun deck and another thirty-two 36-pound short-barreled guns on the upper gun deck. In her forecastle and quarterdeck, she mounted twenty-four 24-pound gunnades, two 24-pound carronades, six 18-pound carronades, two 12-pound carronades, and two 8-pound carronades. Imperatritsa Maria, meanwhile, carried only four of the 68-pounder Paixhans guns, with the rest of her lower battery deck filled with twenty-eight 36-pounder long guns. Her upper deck battery consisted of four more 68-pound shell guns and another twenty-eight 36-pound short-barreled guns. In her forecastle and quarterdeck, she mounted just twenty 24-pound gunnades.

== Ships ==
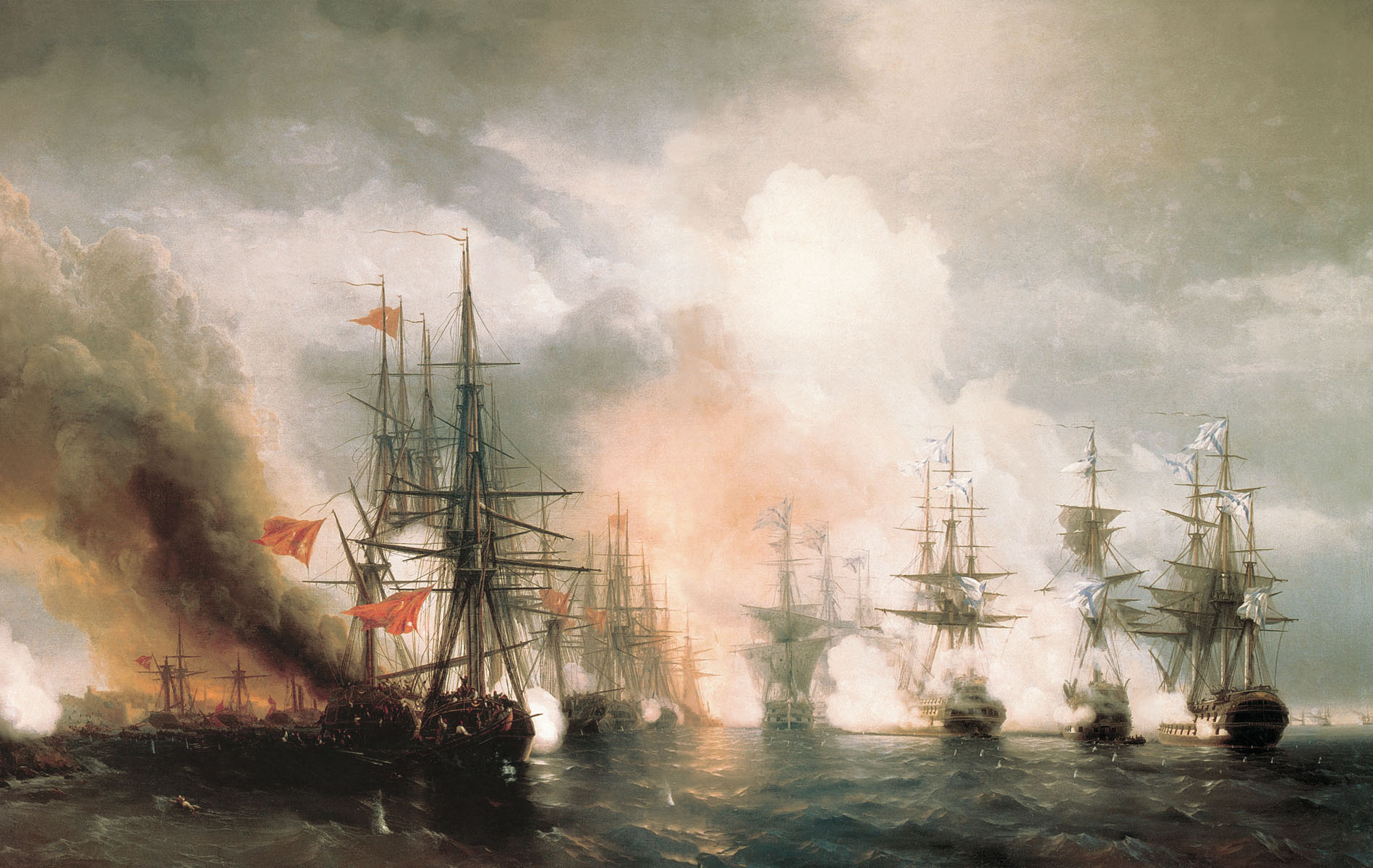
Russian ships at the Battle of Sinop, by Ivan Aivazovsky

Ship	Builder	Laid down	Launched
Khrabryi	S. I. Chernyavskiy, Nikolaev	1 June 1841	25 June 1847
Imperatritsa Maria	I. S. Dimitriev, Nikolaev	23 April 1849	9 May 1853

== Service history ==
Khrabryi saw period of active service with the fleet in the late 1840s and into the early 1850s and both ships were assigned to the squadron commanded by Vice Admiral Pavel Nakhimov on the outbreak of the Crimean War, initially between Russia and Turkey, in October 1853, with Imperatritsa Maria as his flagship. The two ships were used to carry soldiers to Sukhumi that month and in November, the ships patrolled the Black Sea for Ottoman warships. Khrabryi was damaged in a storm and was thus prevented from taking part in the Battle of Sinop on 30 November, where the Russian shell-firing guns destroyed an Ottoman squadron.

The battle prompted Britain and France to intervene on the Ottoman side to contain Russia, which the Russians did not anticipate. Preferring to negotiate a settlement rather than actively fight an Anglo-French fleet that entered the Black Sea, the Russians withdrew their fleet to the safety of Sevastopol. The British and French laid siege to the city and the Russian ships were initially used to guard the city's seaward flank, but were later disarmed to use their guns to strengthen the land defenses. They were both ultimately scuttled in the harbor entrance as block ships to prevent the French and British ships from entering the port.
