= Russian ship Khrabryi =

Ship of the line of the Russian Imperial Navy

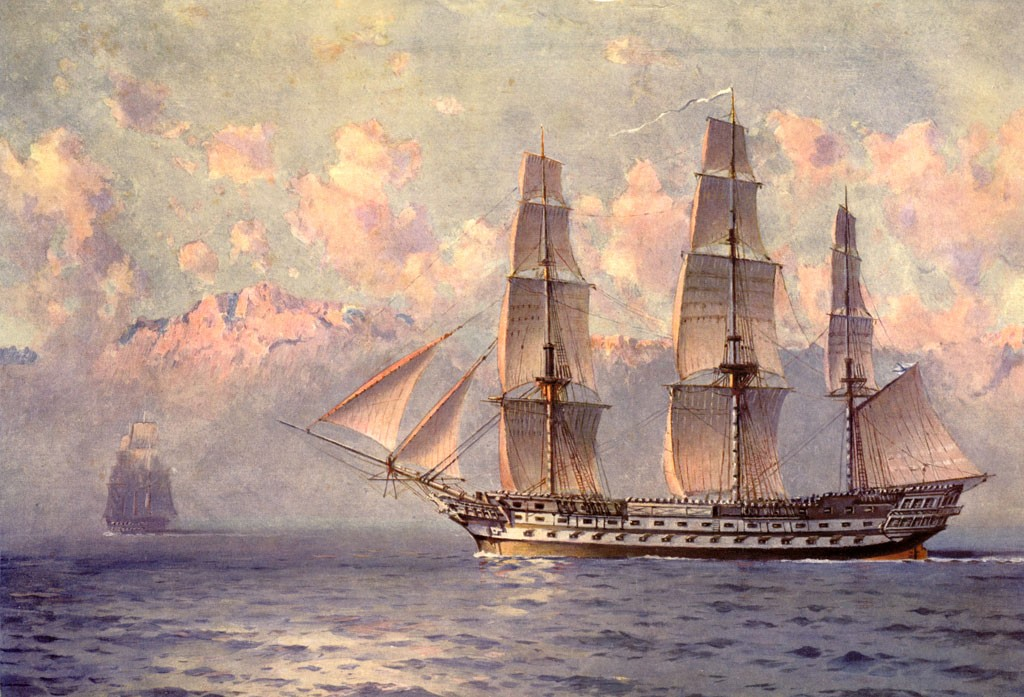
- Khrabryi's sister ship Imperatritsa Maria under sail, by Alexei Hanzen

History

Russian Empire
- Name: Khrabryi
- Builder: S. I. Chernyavskiy
- Laid down: 1 June 1841
- Launched: 25 June 1847
- Fate: Scuttled at the Siege of Sevastopol, 28 August 1855

General characteristics
- Class & type: Khrabryi-class ship of the line
- Displacement: 3,890 metric tons (3,830 long tons; 4,290 short tons)
- Length: 196 ft (60 m)
- Beam: 55 ft (17 m)
- Draft: 26 ft 7 in (8.10 m)
- Armament: 28 × 68-pound Paixhans guns; 4 × 36-pound long guns; 32 × 36-pound short guns; 24 × 24-pound gunnades; 2 × 24-pound carronades; 6 × 18-pound carronades; 2 × 12-pound carronades; 2 × 8-pound carronades

Khrabryi was the lead ship of the Khrabryi class of ships of the line built for the Black Sea Fleet of the Imperial Russian Navy in the 1840s. She saw limited service during the Crimean War in 1853–1854; storm damage prevented her from participating in the Battle of Sinop, and the Russian fleet thereafter avoided battle with the British and French fleets that intervened on behalf of the Ottoman Empire. Disarmed during the Siege of Sevastopol, she was later scuttled there to block the harbor entrance in 1855.

== Design ==
The two Khrabryi-class ships of the line proved to be the culmination of a naval expansion program aimed at strengthening the Russian Black Sea Fleet during a period of increased tension with Britain and France over the decline of one of Russia's traditional enemies, the Ottoman Empire. Beginning in the 1830s, Russia ordered a series of 84-gun ships in anticipation of a future conflict.

Khrabryi was 200 feet (61 m) long, with a beam of 56 ft 3 in (17.15 m) and a draft of 24 ft (7.3 m). The ship was given a broad beam to allow her to carry a heavy battery of 68-pound guns on her lower deck. She displaced 4,160 metric tons (4,090 long tons; 4,590 short tons).

The ship carried a battery of twenty-eight 68-pounder shell-firing Paixhans guns and four 36-pounder long guns on the lower gun deck and another thirty-two 36-pound short-barreled guns on the upper gun deck. In her forecastle and quarterdeck, she mounted twenty-four 24-pound gunnades, two 24-pound carronades, six 18-pound carronades, two 12-pound carronades, and two 8-pound carronades. In 1853, all of the forecastle and quarterdeck carronades were removed, leaving just the twenty-four gunnades.

== Service history ==
Khrabryi was laid down on 15 June 1841 at the S. I. Chernyavskiy shipyard in Nikolaev and was launched on 25 June 1847. After completing fitting-out, she sailed to Sevastopol in 1848. She saw active service in the Black Sea Fleet in 1849 and was then laid up until 1852, when she was reactivated. She remained in service into the next year, and after the start of the Crimean War with the Ottoman Empire in October 1853. She took part in an effort to transport Imperial Russian Army units to Sukhumi that month, with Khrabryi carrying a group of 955 soldiers to the port to strengthen its defenses. The ship then joined a squadron commanded by Vice Admiral Pavel Nakhimov; in November, she was badly damaged in storms, forcing her to return to port for repairs and preventing her from taking part in the Battle of Sinop later that month.

The Russian attack on Sinop, which saw the annihilation of a squadron of Ottoman frigates, was perceived in Britain and France as an attack on Ottoman territory, and thus provided the pro-war factions of their governments justification to intervene in the Crimean War. France and Britain issued an ultimatum to Russia to withdraw its forces from Rumelia, the Ottoman territories in the Balkans, which the Russians initially ignored, prompting Anglo-French declarations of war in March 1854. The Russians were surprised by the intervention and withdrew the fleet to Sevastopol, precluding any possibility of action with the British and French fleet that entered the Black Sea. After repairs, Khrabryi was stationed in the Sevastopol roadstead to guard the harbor and was later trapped there during the Siege of Sevastopol that lasted into early 1855. During the siege, Khrabryi and the rest of the Russian fleet were disarmed to strengthen the land defenses of the city and then scuttled them to block the harbor from the Anglo-French fleet. Khrabryi was scuttled on 28 August.
