= Russian ship Imperatritsa Maria (1853) =

Ship of the line of the Russian Imperial Navy

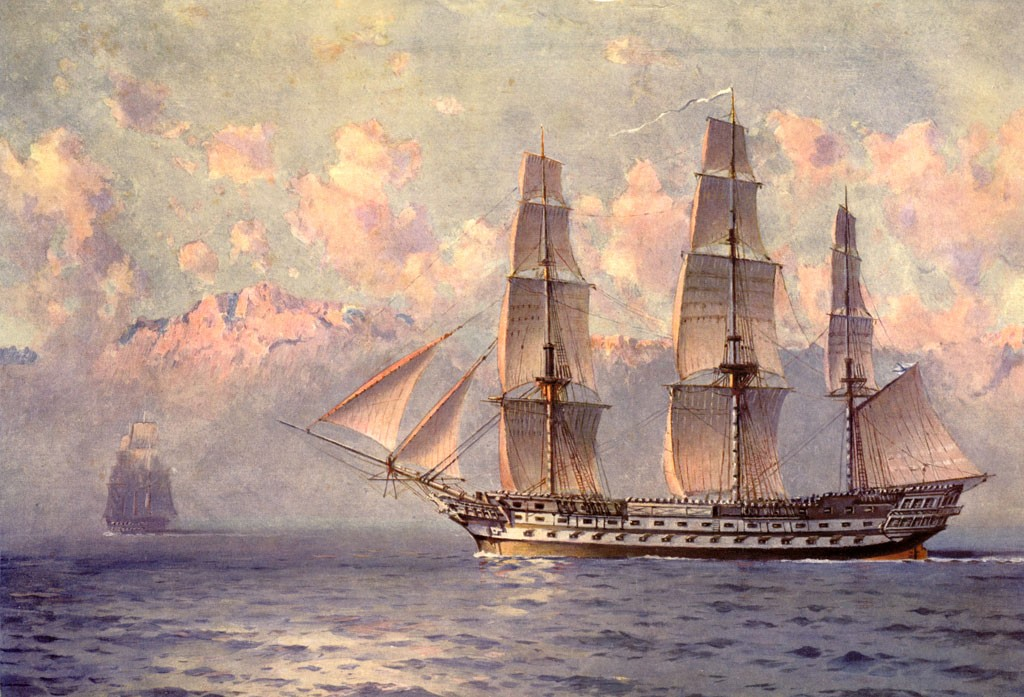
- Imperatritsa Maria under sail, by Alexei Hanzen

History

Russian Empire
- Name: Imperatritsa Maria
- Builder: I. S. Dimitriev
- Laid down: 23 April 1849
- Launched: 9 May 1853
- Fate: Scuttled at the Siege of Sevastopol, 28 August 1855

General characteristics
- Class & type: Khrabryi-class ship of the line
- Displacement: 3,890 metric tons (3,830 long tons; 4,290 short tons)
- Length: 196 ft (60 m)
- Beam: 55 ft (17 m)
- Draft: 26 ft 7 in (8.10 m)
- Armament: 8 × 68-pound Paixhans guns; 28 × 36-pound long guns; 28 × 36-pound short guns; 20 × 24-pound gunnades

Imperatritsa Maria (Russian: Императрица Мария) was an 84-gun third rate ship of the line built for the Black Sea Fleet of the Imperial Russian Navy in the late 1840s and early 1850s as part of a naval expansion program to strengthen the fleet during a period of increased tension with Britain and France. The second and final member of the Khrabryi class, she was the last sail-powered ship of the line to be built for the Russian Navy.

Imperatritsa Maria served as Admiral Pavel Nakhimov's flagship at the Battle of Sinop in November 1853. The crushing Russian victory at Sinop led to the intervention of Britain and France and the Russian fleet, which did not seek to engage the Anglo-French fleet that entered the Black Sea, instead stayed in Sevastopol, eventually being disarmed to strengthen Russian defenses during the Siege of Sevastopol and ultimately being scuttled to block the harbor entrance. Imperatritsa Maria was intentionally sunk as part of this effort in August 1855.

== Design ==
The two Khrabryi-class ships of the line proved to be the culmination of a naval expansion program aimed at strengthening the Russian Black Sea Fleet during a period of increased tension with Britain and France over the decline of one of Russia's traditional enemies, the Ottoman Empire. Beginning in the 1830s, Russia ordered a series of 84-gun ships in anticipation of a future conflict; Imperatritsa Maria was the last of these to be completed.

Imperatritsa Maria was 200 feet (61 m) long, with a beam of 56 ft 8 in (17.27 m) and a draft of 24 ft (7.3 m). The ship was given a broad beam to allow her to carry a heavy battery of 68-pound guns on her lower deck. She displaced 4,160 metric tons (4,090 long tons; 4,590 short tons).

The ship carried a battery of four 68-pounder shell-firing Paixhans guns and twenty-eight 36-pounder long guns on the lower gun deck and four more 68-pound shell guns and another twenty-eight 36-pound short-barreled guns on the upper gun deck. In her forecastle and quarterdeck, she mounted twenty 24-pound gunnades.

== Service history ==
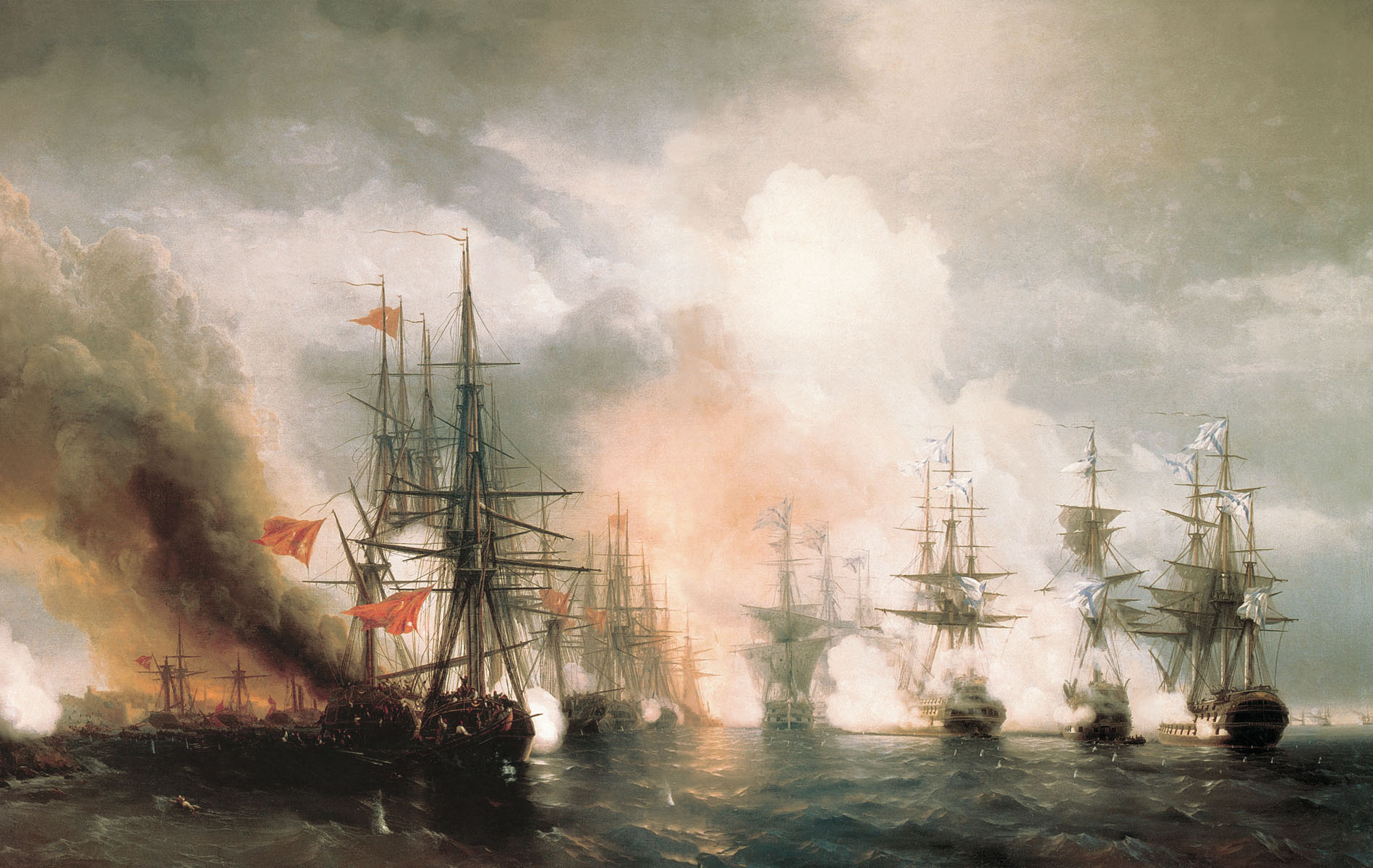
Russian ships at the Battle of Sinop, by Ivan Aivazovsky

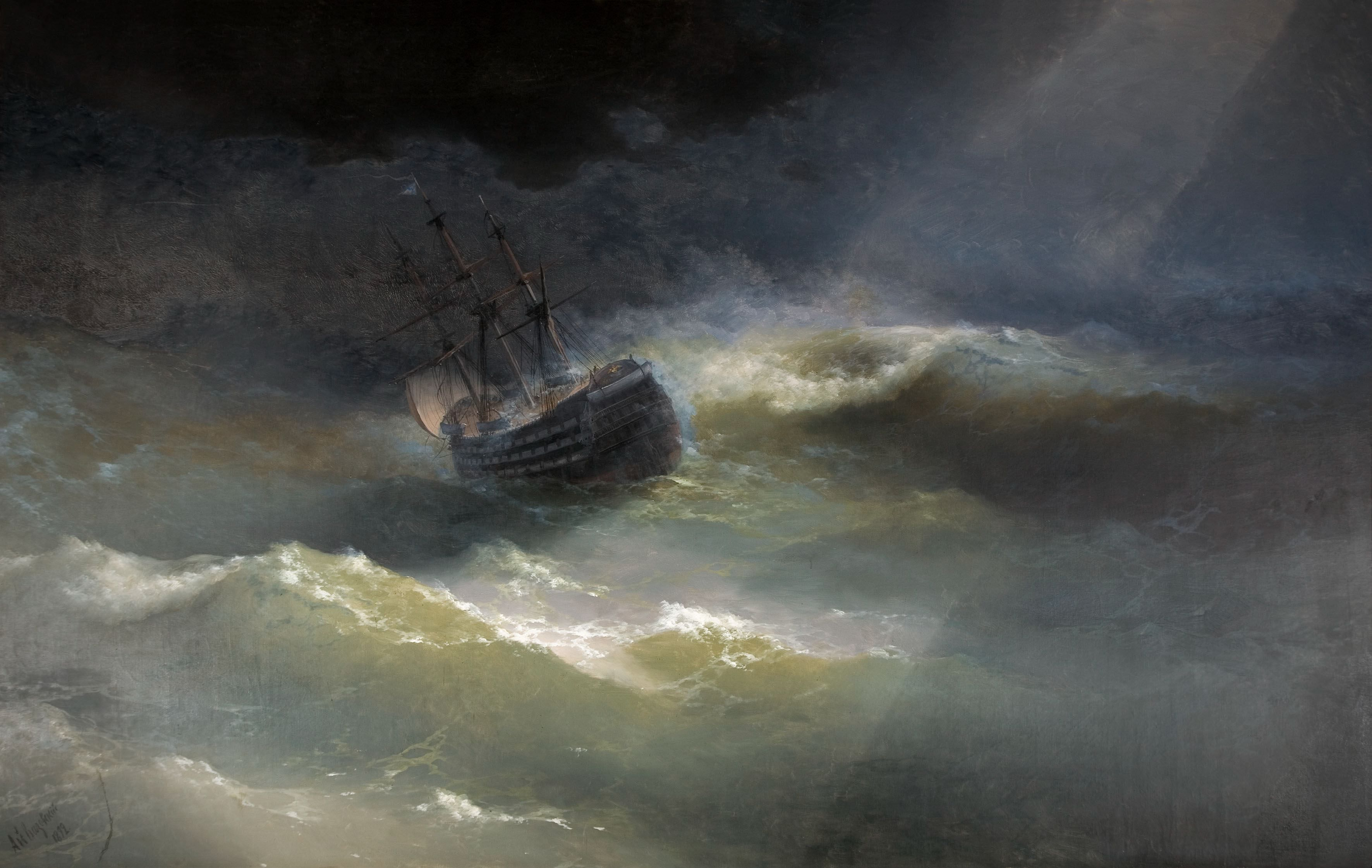
Imperatritsa Maria in a storm, by Ivan Aivazovsky

The keel for Imperatritsa Maria was laid down at the I. S. Dimitriev shipyard in Nikolaev on 23 April 1849. She was launched on 9 May 1853, and she sailed to Sevastopol later that year. She proved to be the last sail-powered ship of the line to be built for the Russian Navy. In October 1853, after the outbreak of the Crimean War between Russia and the Ottoman Empire that month, she carried a contingent of 939 soldiers to Sukhumi. With the mobilization of Russian forces for the conflict, Imperatritsa Maria served as the flagship of a squadron commanded by Vice Admiral Pavel Nakhimov.

Nakhimov took his ships—six ships of the line, two frigates, and three steam ships—to Sinop in late November to attack an Ottoman squadron of seven frigates, two corvettes, and two transports. Nakhimov initially steamed into the harbor on 30 November (N.S.; 18 November O.S.) with his ships in two columns to demand the Ottomans surrender, but the Ottomans rejected the ultimatum. The Russians then anchored some 900 m (3,000 ft) away and began bombarding the Ottoman ships in the harbor in the Battle of Sinop. The Ottomans returned fire, initially inflicting significant damage on the Russian vessels, but the devastating power of the Paixhans guns quickly destroyed the Ottoman fleet. Imperatritsa Maria was heavily engaged in the action, firing 2,128 rounds during the battle and sustaining 60 hits. Her crew suffered 16 killed and 39 wounded. The Ottoman fleet was completely destroyed, in large part due to the destructive power of the Russian shell-firing guns; only one Ottoman vessel escaped destruction: the steam frigate Taif, which had fled at high speed early in the action.

The Russian attack on Sinop was perceived in Britain and France as an attack on Ottoman territory, and thus provided the pro-war factions of their governments justification to intervene in the Crimean War. France and Britain issued an ultimatum to Russia to withdraw its forces from Rumelia, the Ottoman territories in the Balkans, which the Russians initially ignored, prompting Anglo-French declarations of war in March 1854. The Russians were surprised by the intervention and withdrew the fleet to Sevastopol, precluding any possibility of action with the British and French fleet that entered the Black Sea. After repairs, Imperatritsa Maria was stationed in the Sevastopol roadstead to guard the harbor and was later trapped there during the Siege of Sevastopol that lasted into early 1855. During the siege, Imperatritsa Maria and the rest of the Russian fleet were disarmed to strengthen the land defenses of the city and then scuttled them to block the harbor from the Anglo-French fleet. Imperatritsa Maria, though the most modern vessel of the Russian fleet at the time, was nevertheless scuttled on 28 August.
