= Russian ship Chesma (1849) =

Ship of the line of the Russian Imperial Navy

Class overview
- Preceded by: Khrabryi-class ship of the line
- Succeeded by: None
- Completed: 1
- Lost: 1

History

Russian Empire
- Name: Chesma
- Builder: I. S. Dimitriev
- Laid down: 26 July 1842
- Launched: 23 October 1849
- Fate: Scuttled at the Siege of Sevastopol, 28 August 1855

General characteristics
- Type: Ship of the line
- Displacement: 4,030 metric tons (3,970 long tons; 4,440 short tons)
- Length: 196 ft (60 m)
- Beam: 57 ft (17 m)
- Draft: 23 ft 8 in (7.21 m)
- Armament: 8 × 68-pound Paixhans guns; 28 × 36-pound long guns; 32 × 36-pound short guns; 8 × 18-pound long guns; 10 × 36-pound carronades; 2 × 24-pound carronades; 2 × 18-pound carronades; 2 × 8-pound carronades

Chesma was an 84-gun ship of the line built for the Black Sea Fleet of the Imperial Russian Navy in the 1840s. Chesma carried a battery primarily consisting of tradition shot-firing guns, but she also carried four new shell-firing guns. The ship saw combat during the Crimean War at the Battle of Sinop against an Ottoman squadron in 1853, where the Russian shell guns proved to be decisive. The battle prompted Britain and France to intervene to support the Ottomans, leading the Russian fleet to withdraw to Sevastopol to avoid a battle with an Anglo-French fleet. Chesma helped to defend Sevastopol, supporting Russian ground forces during a battle in February 1855 before being disarmed to strengthen the city's defenses and then scuttled to block the harbor entrance to the Anglo-French fleet in August.

== Design ==
Beginning in the 1820s, the Russian Empire embarked on a naval construction program to strengthen the Black Sea Fleet; during this period, the Ottoman Empire was becoming progressively weaker, particularly after a combined Russo-Franco-British fleet annihilated an Ottoman fleet at the Battle of Navarino in 1827. The power vacuum created increased the risk of future conflicts with Britain and France, so the Russian government ordered a series of 84-gun ships of the line to prepare the fleet.

=== Characteristics ===
Chesma was 196 feet (60 m) long, with a beam of 57 ft (17 m) and a draft of 23 ft 8 in (7.21 m). The ship was given a broad beam to allow her to carry a heavy battery of 68-pound guns on her lower deck. She displaced 4,030 metric tons (3,970 long tons; 4,440 short tons).

As originally armed, the ship carried a battery of four 68-pounder shell-firing Paixhans guns and twenty-eight 36-pounder long guns on the lower gun deck and another thirty-two 36-pound short-barreled guns on the upper gun deck. In her forecastle and quarterdeck, she mounted eight 18-pound guns, ten 36-pound carronades, two 24-pound carronades, two 18-pound carronades, and two 8-pound carronades.

In 1853, the armament carried in the forecastle and quarterdeck was considerably simplified; she now carried the ten 36-pound carronades and eight 18-pound carronades. The following year, those guns were replaced with twenty 24-pound gunnades and six of the 18-pound carronades.

== Service history ==
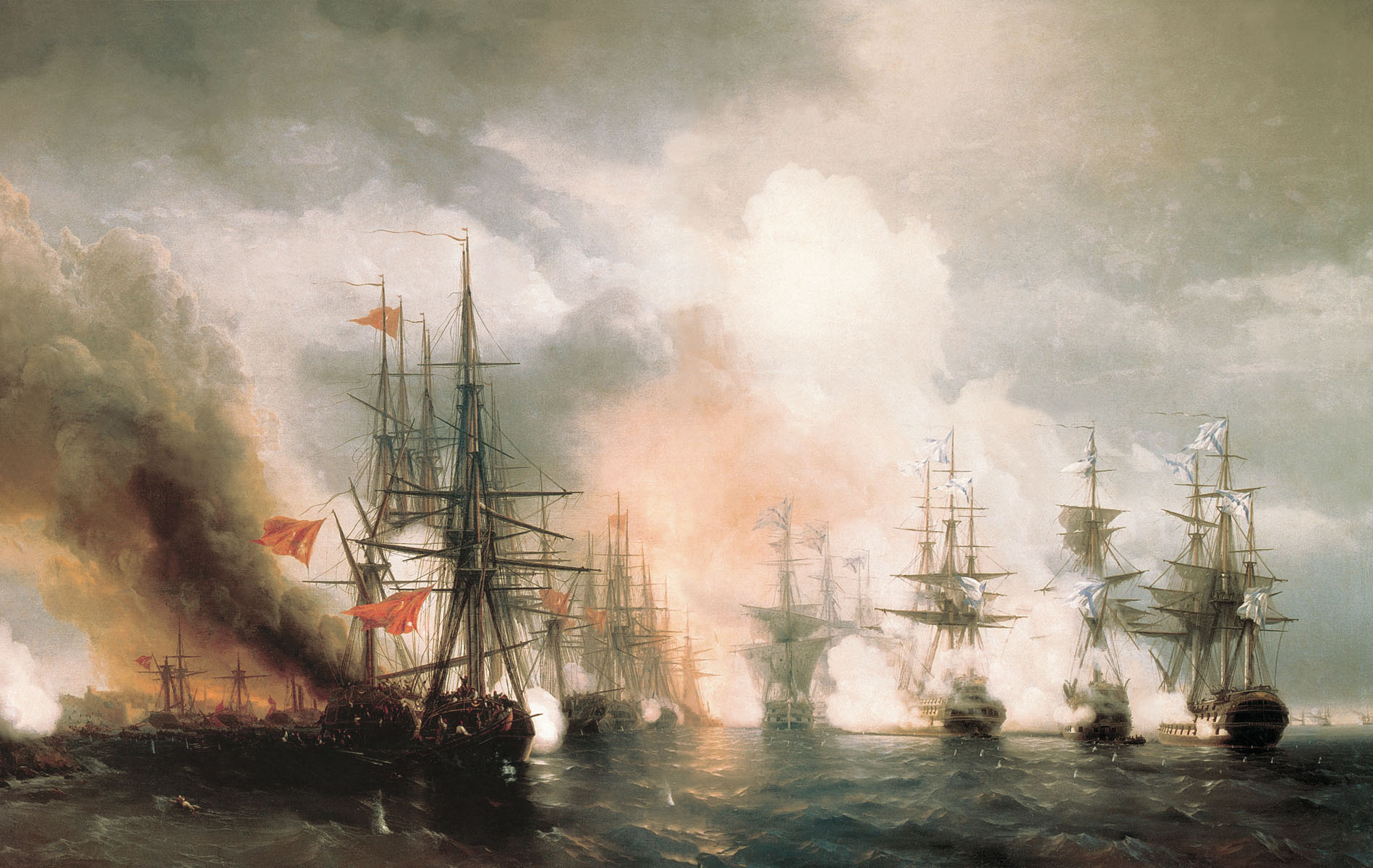
Russian ships at the Battle of Sinop, by Ivan Aivazovsky

Chesma was built by the I. S. Dimitriev shipyard in Nikolaev; she was laid down on 26 July 1842. Work proceeded very slowly, and she was launched on 23 October 1849. The following year, the ship sailed to Sevastopol, and she thereafter operated with the Black Sea Fleet, cruising in the Black Sea through 1853. Following the outbreak of the Crimean War with the Ottoman Empire in October 1853, Chesma was used as part of an effort to carry soldiers to Sukhumi to strengthen defenses in the Caucasus; Chesma carried a contingent of 935 to the port.

Chesma then re-joined a squadron commanded by Vice Admiral Pavel Nakhimov to take part in the Battle of Sinop on 30 November (N.S.; 18 November O.S.). The Russian squadron, which included five other ships of the line, two frigates, and three steam ships, attacked an Ottoman squadron that consisted of seven frigates, three corvettes, and two transports. Nakhimov initially steamed into the harbor with his ships in two columns to demand the Ottomans surrender, but the Ottomans rejected the ultimatum. The Russians then anchored some 900 m (3,000 ft) away and began bombarding the Ottoman ships in the harbor. The Ottomans returned fire, initially inflicting significant damage on the Russian vessels, but the devastating power of the Paixhans guns quickly destroyed the Ottoman fleet. Chesma was heavily engaged in the action, firing 1,539 rounds during the battle and sustaining 20 hits. Her crew suffered few casualties in the action, with only four men wounded. The Ottoman fleet was completely destroyed, in large part due to the destructive power of the Russian shell-firing guns; only one Ottoman vessel escaped destruction: the steam frigate Taif, which had fled at high speed early in the action.

The Russian attack on Sinop was perceived in Britain and France as an attack on Ottoman territory, and thus provided the pro-war factions of their governments justification to intervene in the Crimean War. France and Britain issued an ultimatum to Russia to withdraw its forces from Rumelia, the Ottoman territories in the Balkans, which the Russians initially ignored, prompting Anglo-French declarations of war in March 1854. The Russians were surprised by the intervention and withdrew the fleet to Sevastopol, precluding any possibility of action with the British and French fleet that entered the Black Sea. Chesma was stationed in the Sevastopol roadstead to guard the harbor and was later trapped there during the Siege of Sevastopol that lasted into early 1855. On 12 February 1855, she bombarded Anglo-French forces that attempted to storm the fortress protecting the city, helping to break up the attack. Later during the siege, Chesma and the rest of the Russian fleet were disarmed to strengthen the land defenses of the city and then scuttled them to block the harbor from the Anglo-French fleet. Chesma was sunk in the harbor mouth on 28 August 1855.
