= Russian ship Rostislav (1844) =

Ship of the line of the Russian Imperial Navy

Class overview
- Preceded by: Sultan Makhmud-class ship of the line
- Succeeded by: Khrabryi-class ship of the line
- Completed: 1
- Lost: 1

History

Russian Empire
- Name: Rostislav
- Builder: I. S. Dimitriev
- Laid down: 16 May 1843
- Launched: 1 November 1844
- Fate: Scuttled at the Siege of Sevastopol, 13 February 1855

General characteristics
- Type: Ship of the line
- Displacement: 3,890 metric tons (3,830 long tons; 4,290 short tons)
- Tons burthen: 2,590
- Length: 196 ft (60 m)
- Beam: 55 ft (17 m)
- Draft: 26 ft 7 in (8.10 m)
- Armament: 8 × 68-pound Paixhans guns; 24 × 36-pound long guns; 34 × 36-pound short guns; 20 × 24-pound gunnades; 2 × 24-pound carronades; 6 × 18-pound carronades; 1 × 12-pound carronade

Rostislav was an 84-gun third-rate ship of the line built for the Black Sea Fleet of the Imperial Russian Navy in the 1840s as part of a naval expansion program to strengthen the fleet during a period of increased tension with Britain and France. Rostislav carried a battery primarily consisting of traditional shot-firing guns, but she also carried eight new shell-firing guns. The ship saw combat during the Crimean War at the Battle of Sinop in 1853, where the Russian shell guns proved to be decisive. She repaired in Sevastopol in 1854 and was scuttled during the Siege of Sevastopol in 1855.

== Design ==
Beginning in the 1820s, the Russian Empire embarked on a naval construction program to strengthen the Black Sea Fleet; during this period, the Ottoman Empire was becoming progressively weaker, particularly after a combined Russo-Franco-British fleet annihilated an Ottoman fleet at the Battle of Navarino in 1827. The power vacuum created increased the risk of future conflicts with Britain and France, so the Russian government ordered a series of 84-gun ships of the line to prepare the fleet.

=== Characteristics ===
Rostislav was 196 feet (60 m) long, with a beam of 55 ft (17 m) and a draft of 26 ft 7 in (8.10 m). The ship was given a broad beam to allow her to carry a heavy battery of 68-pound guns on her lower deck. She displaced 3,890 metric tons (3,830 long tons; 4,290 short tons).

Rated as an 84-gun ship, she actually carried as many as 95 guns. As originally armed, the ship carried a battery of eight 68-pounder shell-firing Paixhans guns and twenty-four 36-pounder long guns on the lower gun deck and another thirty-four 36-pound short-barreled guns on the upper gun deck. In her forecastle and quarterdeck, she mounted twenty 24-pound gunnades, two 24-pound carronades, six 18-pound carronades, and one twelve-pound carronade.

In 1853, the armament was revised, with four of the 68-pounder shell guns being moved to the upper deck and their place on the lower deck being taken by four of the 36-pounder guns. The upper deck battery of 36-pounders was reduced to twenty-eight guns, and all of the carronades were removed from the forecastle and quarterdeck. The following year, six 18-pound guns were added to the forecastle and quarterdeck.

== Service history ==
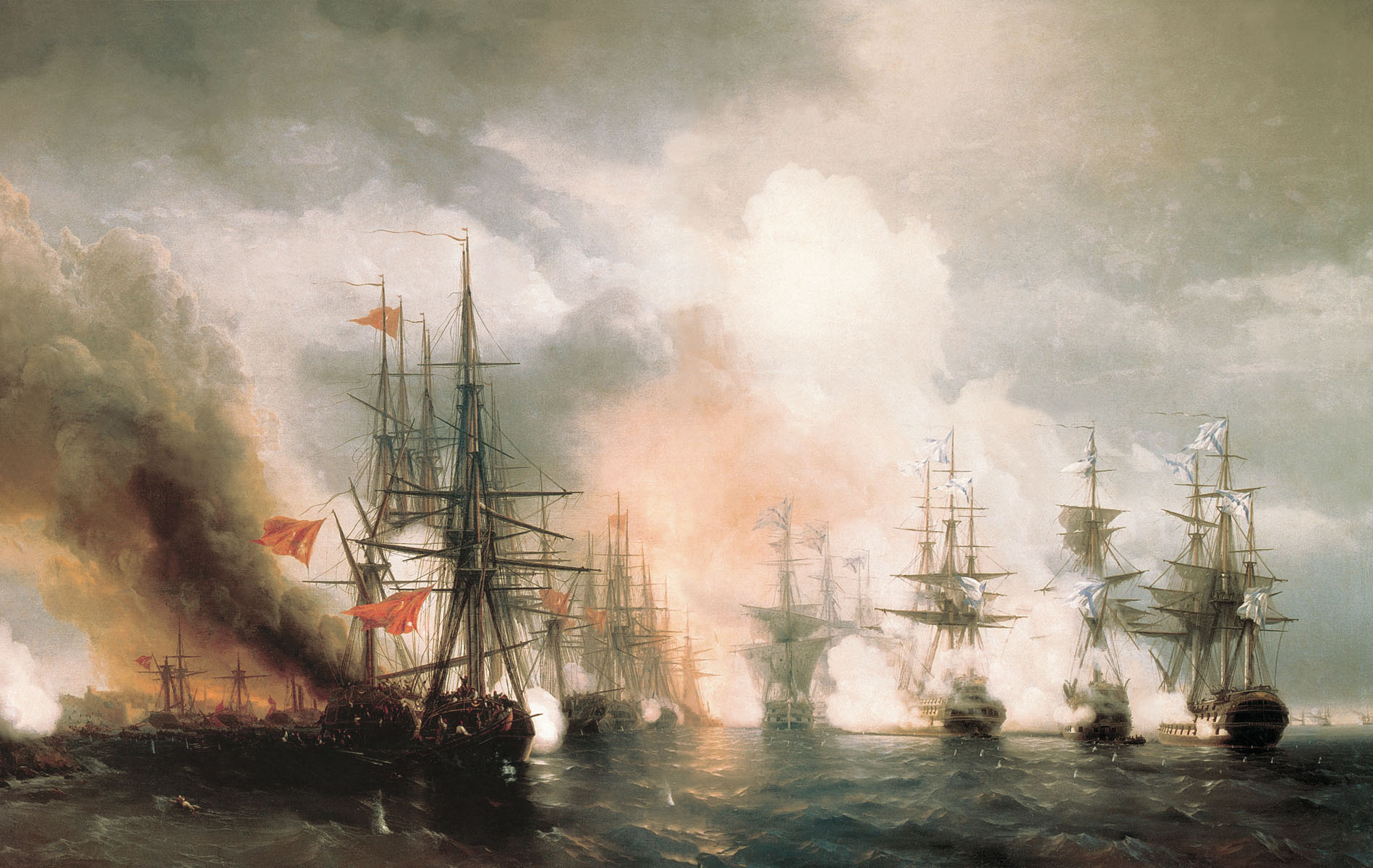
Russian ships at the Battle of Sinop, by Ivan Aivazovsky

Built by I. S. Dimitriev in Nikolaev for the Black Sea Fleet, Rostislav was laid down on 16 May 1843 and was launched on 1 November 1844. In 1846, she moved from Nikolaev to the naval base at Sevastopol. She saw periods of active service in 1847, 1849, and 1852–1853, during which she cruised in the Black Sea. Between these periods, she was laid up in reserve. In October 1853, after the outbreak of the Crimean War between Russia and the Ottoman Empire that month, she carried a contingent of 943 soldiers to Sukhumi.

Rostislav then re-joined a squadron commanded by Vice Admiral Pavel Nakhimov to take part in the Battle of Sinop on 30 November (N.S.; 18 November O.S.). The Russian squadron, which included five other ships of the line, two frigates, and three steam ships, attacked an Ottoman squadron that consisted of seven frigates, three corvettes, and two transports. Nakhimov initially steamed into the harbor with his ships in two columns to demand the Ottomans surrender, but the Ottomans rejected the ultimatum. The Russians then anchored some 900 m (3,000 ft) away and began bombarding the Ottoman ships in the harbor. The Ottomans returned fire, initially inflicting significant damage on the Russian vessels, but the devastating power of the Paixhans shell guns quickly destroyed the Ottoman fleet. Rostislav was heavily engaged in the action, firing 3,960 rounds during the battle and sustaining 25 hits. Her crew suffered 3 killed and 105 wounded. The Ottoman fleet was completely destroyed, in large part due to the destructive power of the Russian shell-firing guns; only one Ottoman vessel escaped destruction: the steam frigate Taif, which had fled at high speed early in the action.

The Russian attack on Sinop was perceived in Britain and France as an attack on Ottoman territory, and thus provided the pro-war factions of their governments justification to intervene in the Crimean War. France and Britain issued an ultimatum to Russia to withdraw its forces from Rumelia, the Ottoman territories in the Balkans, which the Russians initially ignored, prompting Anglo-French declarations of war in March 1854. The Russians were surprised by the intervention and withdrew the fleet to Sevastopol, precluding any possibility of action with the British and French fleet that entered the Black Sea. Rostislav was repaired in Sevastopol in 1854 but saw no further activity. She remained trapped there during the Siege of Sevastopol into early 1855; during this period, the Russians disarmed their ships to strengthen the land defenses of the city and then scuttled them to block the harbor from the Anglo-French fleet. Rostislav was scuttled on 13 February.
