= Grigory Butakov =

Russian admiral

Grigory Ivanovich Butakov
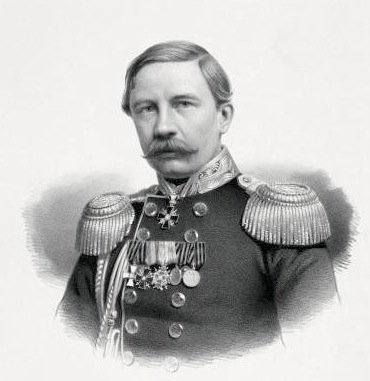
- Born: 9 October 1820; Riga
- Died: 9 May 1882 (aged 61); Saint Petersburg
- Burial place: Nikolskoe Cemetery, Alexander Nevsky Lavra, Saint Petersburg; 59°55′17.04″N 30°23′29.04″E
- Military career
- Allegiance: Russian Empire
- Branch: Imperial Russian Navy
- Service years: 1837–1881 (44 years)
- Rank: Admiral
- Commands: Black Sea Fleet (1856); Baltic Practical Propelled Ships Squadron (1860)
- Awards: Demidov Prize; Order of St. George IV Degree
- Other work: New Principles of Steamboat Tactics (1863); Rules of Boat Race (c. 1860–1881)

Grigory Ivanovich Butakov (Russian: Григорий Иванович Бутаков) (9 October 1820 – 31 May 1882) was a Russian admiral who fought in the Crimean War. Butakov is widely credited as being the father of steam-powered ship tactics during the 19th century. He was involved in the first battles of the Crimean War, which includes the first sea battles involving steam-powered ships. Butakov wrote of his experiences in his book: New Principles of Steamboat Tactics (1863), which won him the Demidov Prize. In 1881 Butakov assumed the role of Commander-in-Chief of the Port of St. Petersburg. He was also made a member of the State Council in March 1882. Shortly after gaining both titles however, Butakov fell seriously ill, and died on 31 May 1882, aged 62. The minor planet 4936 Butakov was named in his memory.

== Early life ==
Grigory Ivanovich Butakov was born 9 October 1820 in Riga; a large city in the Russian Empire (now in Latvia). Butakov's father was a distinguished naval officer who fought in the Russo-Turkish War of 1806. He captained the battleship Tsar Constantine, in which he commanded during several naval operations around Crete and in the Blockade of the Dardanelles. Butakov was inspired by his father's success as a naval officer, so in May 1831 at eleven years old, Butakov decided to join a Naval Academy in St. Petersburg. Butakov spent six years in the Naval Academy. He graduated in 1837 and was immediately assigned to serve as a flag officer aboard the Russian vessel Silistria. The Silistria was under the personal command of the then Chief Commander of the Black Sea Fleet: Admiral Mikhail Lazarev.

In May 1838, Butakov took part in a landing operation near Abkhazia against Turkish positions. Butakov was awarded several decorations for bravery during the operation. From September 1838 to August 1840, Butakov patrolled the Aegean Sea aboard the schooner Lastochka, and in 1844, he patrolled the Mediterranean Sea aboard the Vestnik. The following August, Butakov was promoted to the rank of lieutenant. Not long after his promotion, Butakov became interested in improvements to the Navy in the field of Naval Science. Butakov developed a completely new system of fog signals, and invented a new version of windlass. Butakov's Admiral, Mikhail Lazarev was pleased with Butakov's new technologies and had the inventions placed in the model room of the Admiralty. In the Autumn of 1846, Butakov was appointed Captain of the cutter Pospeshny and promoted to the rank of Lieutenant-Commander, and given a diamond ring. The Russian Empire was the first naval power to pioneer the construction of steam warships. On 3 December 1852, Lieutenant-Commander Grigory Butakov was made captain of the steam-ship Vladimir, considered the best steam-powered warship in the Black Sea Fleet.

== Crimean war ==
When the Crimean War began in October 1853, Grigory Butakov was sent with to the Black Sea aboard the steamship Vladimir. The battle in which Grigory Butakov aboard the steam-ship Vladimir, fought and captured the Turkish steam-ship Pervaz Bahri was historically important on two accounts: Firstly, it was the very first battle of the Crimean War, and secondly, it was the first battle involving only steam-ships, marking a new age of naval warfare. The battle occurred on 5 November 1853, on the Black Sea. Butakov sailed the Vladimir towards the region of Penderakli, on the way the crew of the Vladimir saw an unfamiliar vessel sailing towards them. As the Vladimir got closer to the unidentified ship, the crew realized the ship was Turkish. It was a 10-gun steam-ship called the Pervaz Bahri

=== Pervaz Bahri ===
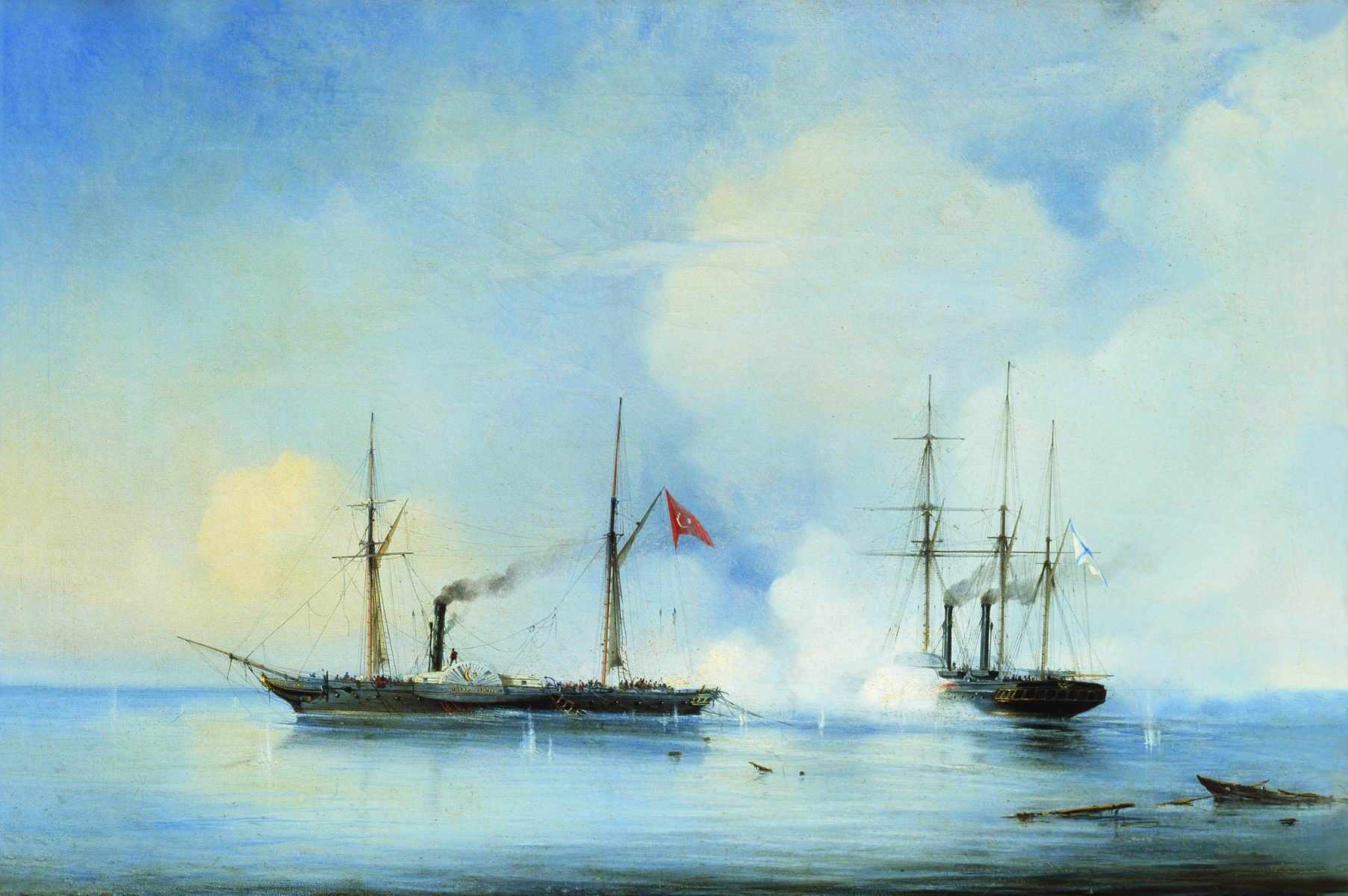
The Vladimir (right) battling the Pervaz Bahri (left) on 5 November 1853.

The 10-gun Turkish steamship that was steadily nearing the Vladimir had no bow or stern artillery. This made it an attractive target for any Russian war ship. Once the Ottoman ship was in range, Butakov maneuvered the Vladimir into advantageous positions for an attack. Butakov would take up a position from behind the Pervaz Bahri 's stern, and rake the ship with cannon fire. This maneuver was successful due to the Ottoman ship not having any stern artillery. Every time the Pervaz Bahri tried to employ side artillery upon the Vladimir, Butakov would repeatedly take up an advantageous position behind enemy stern, and bombard the ship with cannon shot.

Despite Butakov's successful tactics in attacking the Ottoman ship, the battle was taking more time than expected. Butakov's superiors then ordered him to speed up the sinking or capture of the Turkish vessel. Butakov then gave an order to pick up speed, and at a distance of 100 meters, he opened canister fire from all ship's the guns. The Pervaz Bahri then surrendered to the crew of the Vladimir, ending a three-hour-long battle which took many Turkish casualties. This was a major victory for Butakov because it was Russia's first steam-powered sea battle victory. On 7 November, the newly captured ship was brought to the port of Sevastopol, where it underwent major repairs. The ship was renamed: Kornilov, and was commissioned into the Russian navy.

Grigory Butakov's commanding officers thought very highly of him, particularly after the victory over the Pervas Bahri. The naval officer, Vladimir Alexeyevich Kornilov, whom the captured ship was renamed after, commented on Butakov's skill as a commander: "He behaves and gives commands as if it were just maneuvers or war games". After the battle, Butakov was promoted to Captain Second Rank, and was awarded the Order of St. George IV Degree. Kornilov, in particular valued Butakov's service greatly; when Kornilov wrote his name on a list of naval officers, he added the words: "Much respected and loved by the officers".

=== Sevastopol ===
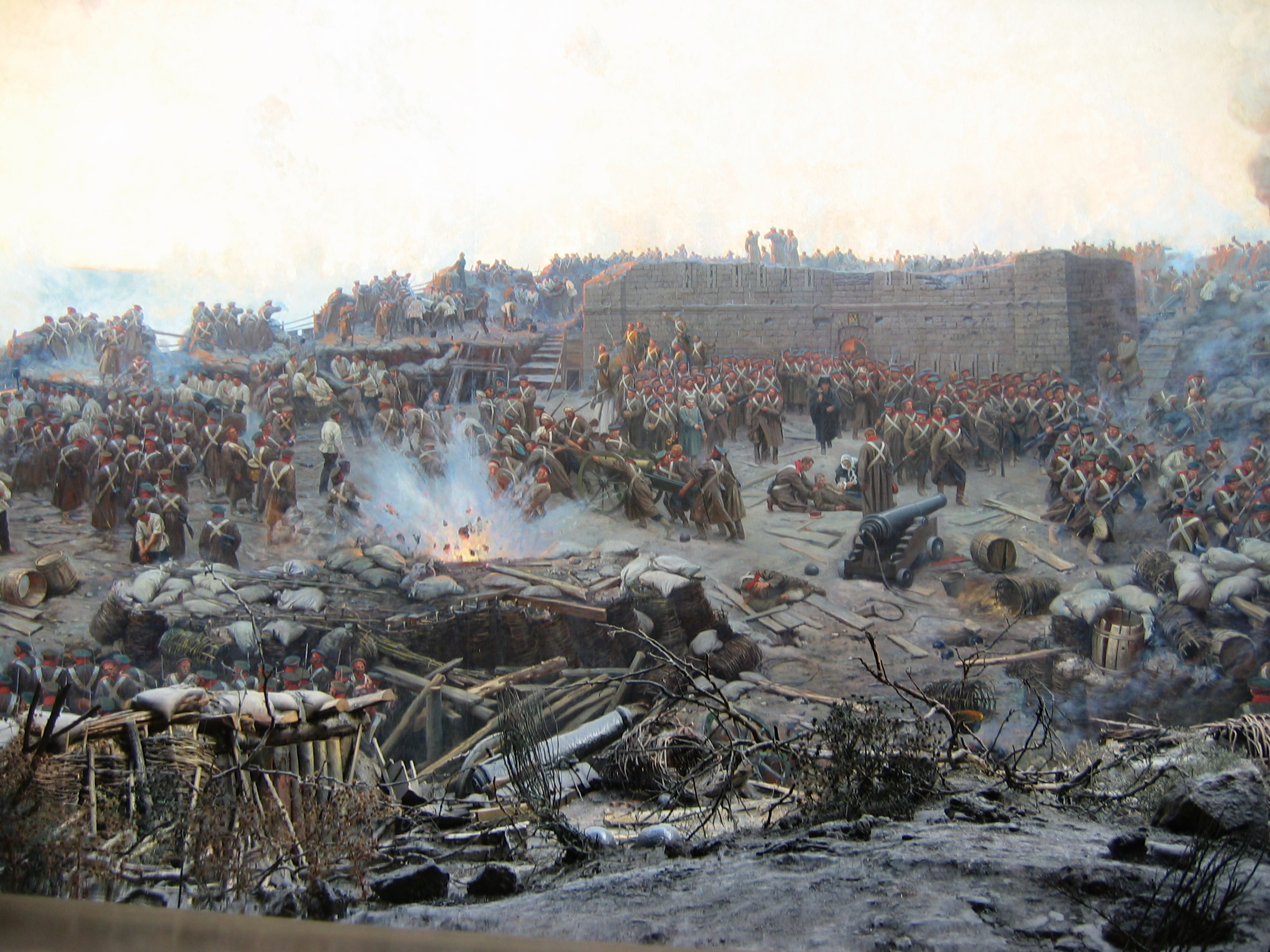
Siege of Sevastopol by Franz Roubaud (detail).

In September 1854, British, Ottoman and French forces laid siege to Sevastopol, the main base of the Black Sea Fleet. Grigory Butakov provided substantial cannon support during the siege by sailing into favorable positions and bombarding the British, French and Ottoman fortifications, which surrounded the port. The Russian garrison at Sevastopol was low during the siege; only 36,600 men were fit for action, while the number of Allied troops totaled 175,000 men. Because of the low amount of manpower, many sailors volunteered to leave their ships, and fight as infantry on the ground. Butakov also volunteered to leave the Vladimir, and fight as an infantryman. However, his offer was immediately refused by a senior naval officer; Pavel Nakhimov, he said to Butakov: "I can not do that, such people like you are to be preserved for the future of the fleet".

Throughout the Siege of Sevastopol, Butakov stayed aboard the Vladimir, repulsing enemy counterattacks and bombarding fortified positions. In August, Butakov was sent with several steamships to protect the left flank on eastern shore of Killen-balka from Allied attacks. Butakov sailed the Vladimir so close to the shore that he actually made his ship inaccessible to the French battery, while maintaining a clear line of sight of the enemy cannons, he then ordered his ships to fire upon the French battery, causing major damage. A sailor in the fleet commented on Butakov's calmness during the conflict: "[he] was the first to set his crew an example of remarkably cool behavior, self-control and fearlessness. Everyone would be just enraptured and stunned by his coolness and the way he gave orders; he did this as if there were no cannonballs and bullets flying around him, as if there were not any possibility for him to be killed any minute".

In August 1855, Admiral Novonilsky ordered 15 Russian ships to be scuttled, and their cannons be used to help defend the port. Butakov's flagship Vladimir was one of the 15 ships, Butakov and her crew were secreted back to Russia, and would be transferred to the Baltic Fleet. The scuttled ships were: Grand Duke Constantine, City of Paris (both with 120 guns), Brave, Empress Maria, Chesme, Yagondeid (84 guns), Kavarna (60 guns), Konlephy (54 guns), steam frigate Vladimir, steamboats Thunderer, Bessarabia, Danube, Odessa, Elbrose and Krein. The guns and several crew members from the ships were used to defend Sevastopol. On 9 September the port fell to allied forces, marking the beginning of the eventual defeat of Russia in the Crimean War. The siege of Sevastopol claimed many lives on both sides; the Russians lost 102,000 killed and wounded, while the number of British, French and Ottoman casualties numbered 128,387 deaths. Soon after the Siege, the Crimean War was over, ending in Russia's defeat.

== Naval science ==
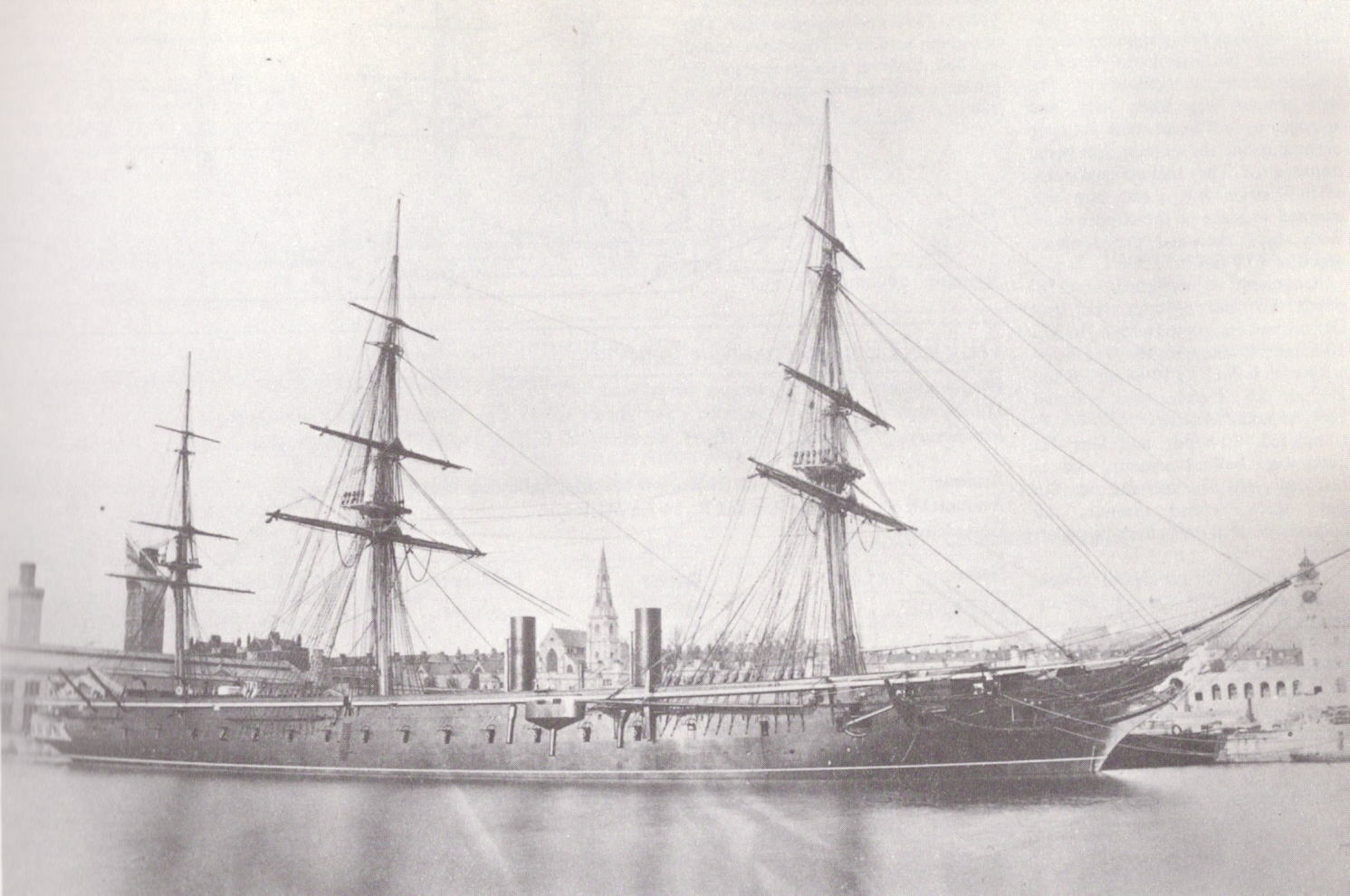
The British HMS Warrior, an early ironclad warship.

When the Crimean War ended in February 1856, Grigory Butakov was promoted to rear admiral. By this time he was 36 years old, and had spent 25 of those years in the Imperial Russian Navy. Butakov was also appointed High Chief of the naval unit in Nikolayev and also the Naval Governor of Nikolayev and Sevastopol. Throughout his time serving in these positions, Butakov kept studying the field of Naval Science. In early 1854, Butakov compiled descriptions of "evolutions" in steam warship design, such advantageous turns and maneuvering of the ships in line that would be necessary for taking up the most advantageous position during battle. Butakov wrote of his improvements: "I happened to develop a rather simple yet ingenious idea, namely, two simple geometric lines – a circle and a tangent to it – should be considered the basis for steamship evolutions". Butakov also found solutions to some tactical problems, drew up illustrative tables of courses and movements of ships in the fleet, and outlined three basic detachment formations. Butakov would compile his ideas in his book; New Principles of Steamboat Tactics. According to Butakov, he managed to solve the very essence of the problem of developing the steam-powered tactics in a more radical, fundamental way, not just superficially.

Grigory Butakov was transferred to the Baltic Fleet in 1860. In 1863, Butakov compiled all of his notes on tactical strategies of steamboats, and wrote about them in a book called: New principles of Steamboat Tactics. The book gained immense interest both in Russia, and many countries in Western Europe. The book was translated into English, French, Italian and Spanish. Recognizing Butakov's success as an accomplished naval scientist, the Chairman of the Naval Science Committee, Rear Admiral Zeleny, awarded Butakov with the Demidov Prize. On 28 October 1866, Butakov was promoted to the rank of vice admiral. By this time, Butakov was enjoying world-wide fame, both for his Naval Science knowledge, and his commanding abilities. His reputation as an Admiral at the time was considered to be the best in the Russian Navy. On 6 February 1867, he was appointed the Chief of the Baltic armored ships squadron.

=== Artillery improvements ===
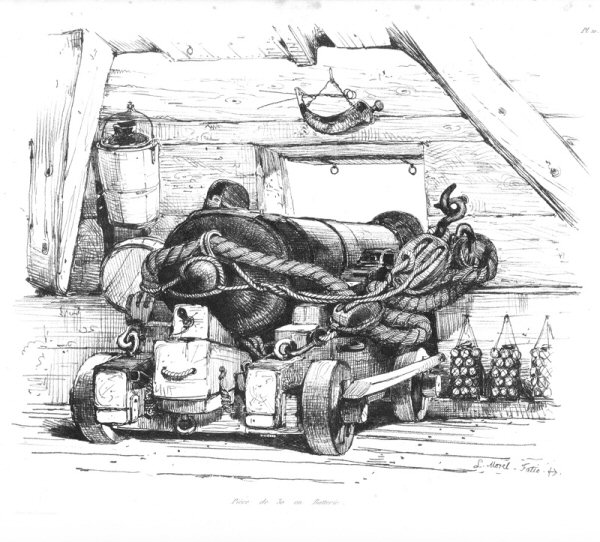
A typical smooth−bore cannon. Russian Navy smooth−bore cannons were replaced with rifled guns in c. late 1800s

Whilst serving in the Baltic Fleet, Grigory Butakov paid much attention to artillery preparation of his squadron, he knew that although the Russian navy excelled in steamboat warfare, the cannons aboard the ships were seriously outdated. Butakov also knew that recent advancements in the form of 'Ironclad' ship armor, would mean that cannons had to be improved in order to penetrate the armor. The problem was solved by replacing smooth-bore guns of a relatively small caliber, with rifled guns of bigger calibers which included 12-inch ones, the rifled guns were particularly successful because of their armor – penetrating qualities. Butakov also developed a system which included; first, firing from one ship at a fixed shield, then at a towed one, and finally, firing at a moving target. This system proved successful against armored ships.

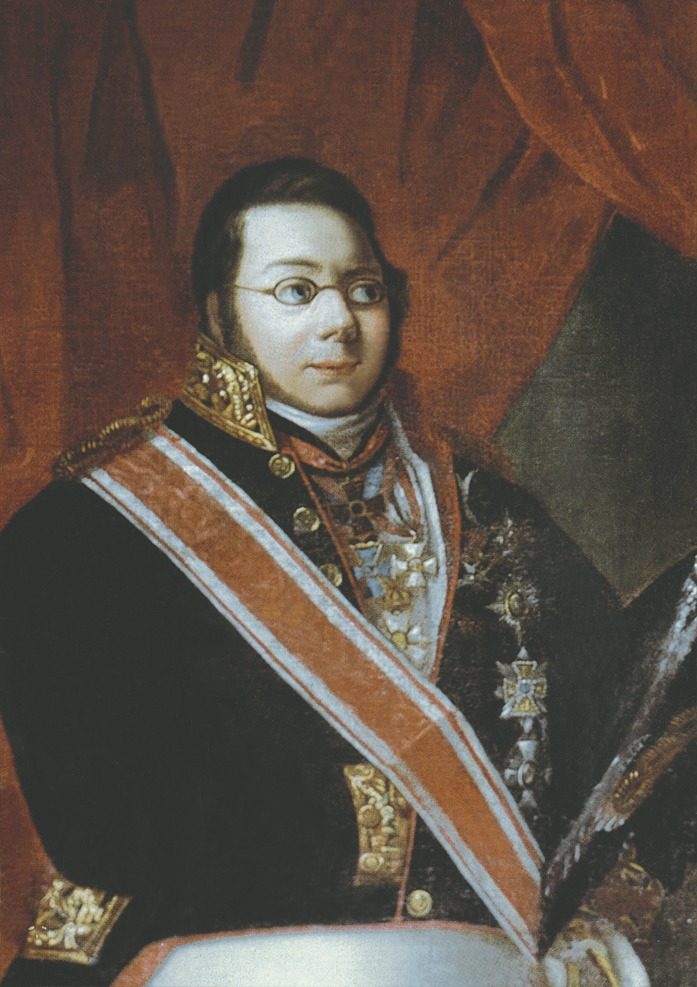
The founder of the Demidov Prize, which Grigory Butakov won.

=== Boat races ===
Throughout his naval career, Grigory Butakov extensively enjoyed boat racing, and adopted the sport as his chief pastime while on leave from the navy. Butakov enjoyed races involving both steamboats and sailboats. He believed that boat racing was not only a good pastime for sailors, it was also good for their training and military skill. He said: "I believe [boat racing] is by far one of the best and most appropriate means available for our young sailors to try their wings, start strengthening their will, nerves and stamina, train their faultless eye and prepare themselves to face any unforeseen circumstances which are so frequent throughout our service…Besides, the boat race is a wonderful and effective way to find out what metal each of us is made of".

Butakov was so passionate about boat racing, he secured annual allocations of 1500 rubles in prize money for young sailors in boat racing competitions. Butakov published a book on the subject called Rules of Boat Race. At the end of every race Butakov would analyze the mistakes made by his sailors while steering and praised those distinguished themselves in competitions. He once fired six – gun salute in honor of a midshipman's crew for their team – spirit and excellence in racing in a "steering without wheels" race.

=== Sea mines ===
From 1867 to 1877, Butakov served aboard an Armoured Ship Squadron in the service of the Baltic Fleet. While in the squadron, Butakov paid much attention to the improvement of sea – mine weaponry. In 1867, Butakov conducted the first experiments of sea – mines, which were engaged in experiments on laying galvanised mines under old ships and testing mine fields. In 1874, the armored frigate Petropavlovsk was first equipped with anti-torpedo artillery. During the Russian-Turkish war of 1877–1878 Butakov developed the guidelines and maps for laying mines on the fairways, which he put into practice while organizing the mine defense of Kronstadt. Following Butakov's experiments, the Officers Mine Class and Mining School for the Lower Ranks was opened.

== Last years ==
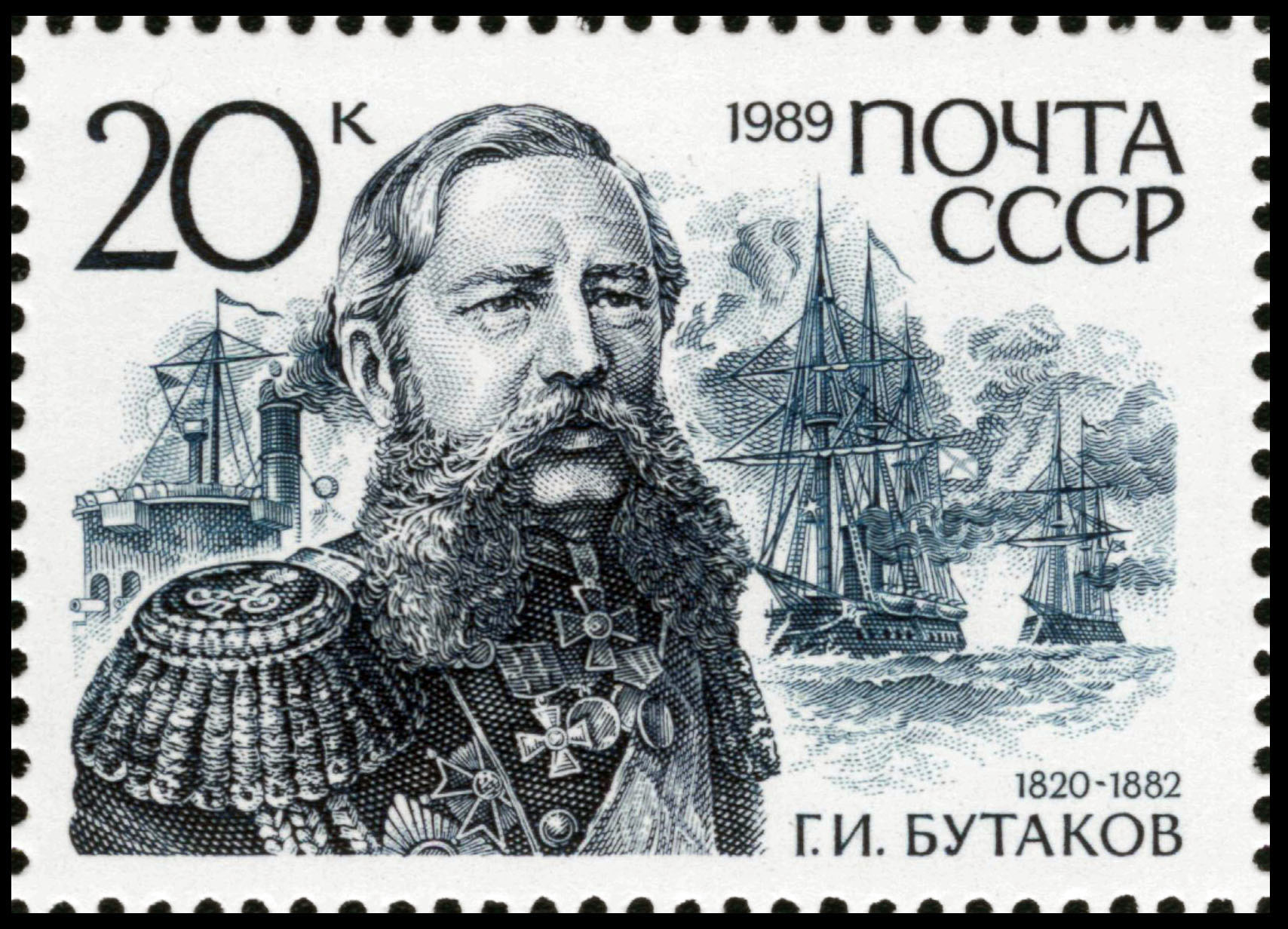
A Soviet post stamp from 1989 depicting Butakov

On 16 October 1878, Grigory Butakov was promoted from Vice-Admiral to Admiral, and was appointed Chief Commander of the Sveaborg coastal fortifications. At the beginning of 1881, he was appointed the Chief Commander of the St. Petersburg port. In March 1882, Grigory Butakov was elected a member of the National State Council: He took this assignment at the end of his life's work. Soon after that he fell seriously ill and died of apoplexy on 31 May 1882, while crossing the River Neva in a skiff, returning from a meeting of the State Council. He was widely mourned throughout Russia and he was buried in the Nikolskoe Cemetery of the Alexander Nevsky Lavra, Saint Petersburg.
