= 4936 Butakov =

Main-belt asteroid

Discovery
- Discovered by: L. V. Zhuravleva
- Discovery site: Crimean Astrophysical Obs.
- Discovery date: 22 October 1985

Designations
- Named after: Grigory Butakov (Russian admiral)
- Alternative designations: 1985 UY_{4} · 1978 TK_{4} 1978 VH_{12}
- Minor planet category: main-belt · Flora

Orbital characteristics
- Epoch 4 September 2017 (JD 2458000.5)
- Uncertainty parameter 0
- Observation arc: 66.70 yr (24,364 days)
- Aphelion: 2.5617 AU
- Perihelion: 1.9909 AU
- Semi-major axis: 2.2763 AU
- Eccentricity: 0.1254
- Orbital period (sidereal): 3.43 yr (1,254 days)
- Mean anomaly: 70.538°
- Mean motion: 0° 17^{m} 13.2^{s} / day
- Inclination: 5.9129°
- Longitude of ascending node: 155.77°
- Argument of perihelion: 283.92°

Physical characteristics
- Dimensions: 4.465±0.051; 4.867±0.025 km 5.41 km (calculated)
- Synodic rotation period: 13.828±0.001 h 13.9078±0.3029 h 19.200±0.380 h
- Geometric albedo: 0.24 (assumed); 0.3589±0.0587; 0.428±0.076
- Spectral type: S
- Absolute magnitude (H): 13.5 · 13.3 · 13.400±0.080 (R) · 13.418±0.001 (R)

4936 Butakov, provisional designation 1985 UY_{4}, is a stony Florian asteroid from the inner regions of the asteroid belt, approximately 5 kilometers in diameter. The asteroid was discovered on 22 October 1985, by Soviet–Ukrainian astronomer Lyudmila Zhuravleva at the Crimean Astrophysical Observatory in Nauchnyj, on the Crimean peninsula. It was named after Russian admiral Grigory Butakov.

== Orbit and classification ==
The S-type asteroid is a member of the Flora family, one of the largest groups of stony asteroids in the main-belt. It orbits the Sun in the inner main-belt at a distance of 2.0–2.6 AU once every 3 years and 5 months (1,254 days). Its orbit has an eccentricity of 0.13 and an inclination of 6° with respect to the ecliptic. The first precovery was obtained at the U.S. Goethe Link Observatory in 1950, extending the asteroid's observation arc by 35 years prior to its discovery.

== Physical characteristics ==
=== Rotation period ===
According to the survey carried out by NEOWISE mission of NASA's space-based Wide-field Infrared Survey Explorer, Butakov measures 4.5 and 4.9 kilometers in diameter and its surface has a high albedo of 0.36 and 0.43, respectively, while the Collaborative Asteroid Lightcurve Link assumes an intermediate albedo of 0.24 – which derives from 8 Flora, the largest member and namesake of this orbital family – and calculates a somewhat larger diameter of 5.4 kilometers.

=== Diameter and albedo ===
In 2007, a rotational lightcurves of Butakov was obtained at the Carbuncle Hill Observatory which gave a rotation period of 13.828±0.001 hours with a brightness amplitude of 0.14 in magnitude (U=2). Two more lightcurves were obtained from photometric observations made at the U.S. Palomar Transient Factory in January and February 2014. They showed a rotation period of 19.200±0.380 and 13.9078±0.3029 hours, respectively, with a corresponding brightness variation of 0.11 and 0.08 in magnitude (U=2/2).

== Naming ==
This minor planet was named in memory of Russian admiral Grigory Butakov (1820–1882), who fought in the Crimean War. In 1856, when the war ended, he became Rear admiral of the Black Sea Fleet and Naval Governor of Nikolaev and Sevastopol. The minor planet 2121 Sevastopol is named after the city on the Crimean peninsula. Butakov is widely credited as being the father of steam-powered ship tactics during the 19th century. The official naming citation was published by the Minor Planet Center on 4 May 1999 (M.P.C. 34620).
