= Dasha from Sevastopol =

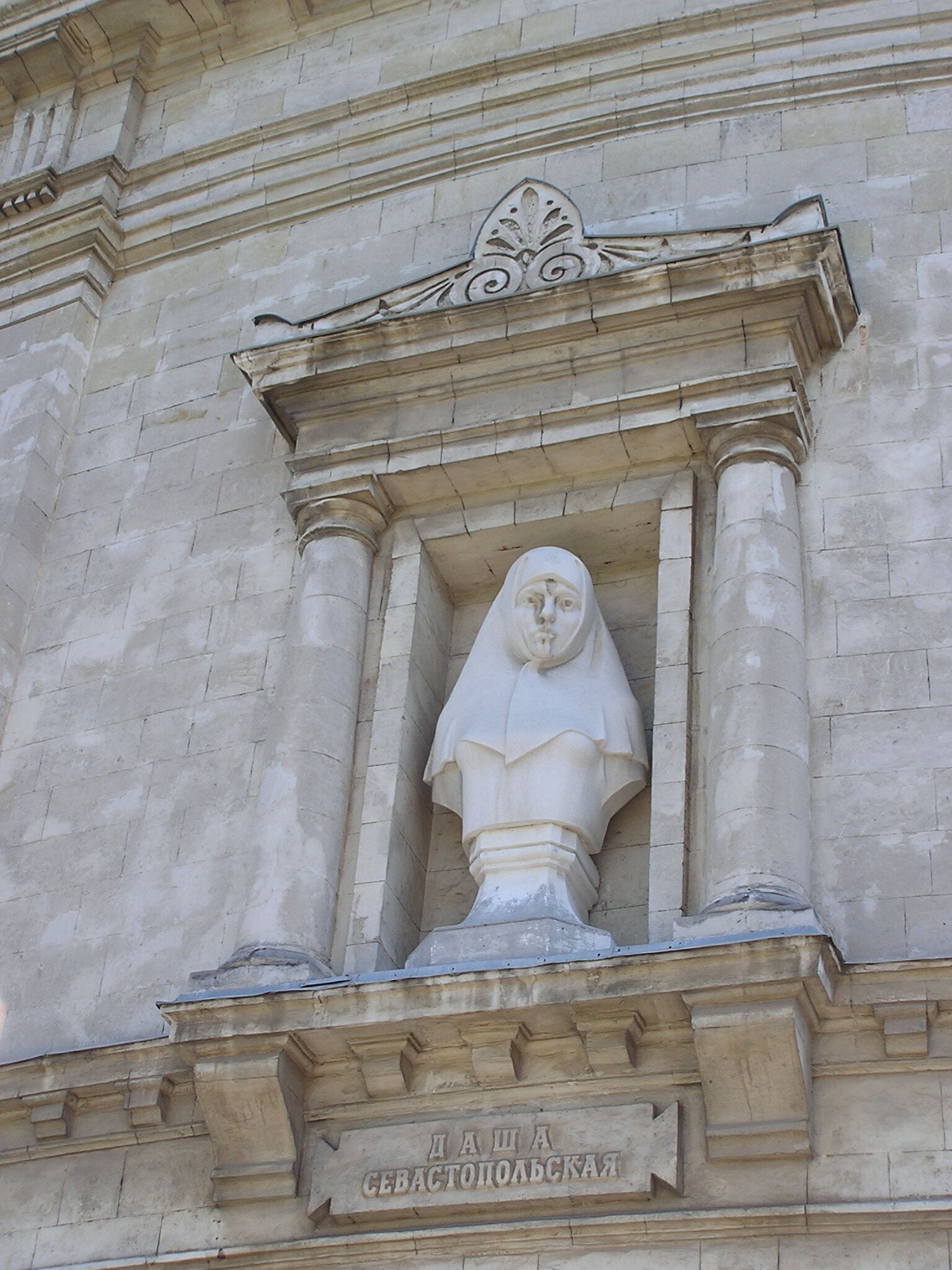
A bust of Dasha from Sevastopol adorns the building of Franz Roubaud's panorama in Sevastopol.

Darya Lavrentyevna Mikhailova (Russian: Дарья Лаврентьевна Михайлова) (November 1836 – 1892) was a Russian nurse during the siege of Sevastopol in the 1853-1856 Crimean War, from which she became better known by the name Dasha of Sevastopol (Russian: Даша Севастопольская). She became one of the founders of modern nursing - in parallel to the work of Florence Nightingale.

Mikhailova was born in a village near Klyuchischi in the Kazan Governorate. Her father, a sailor in the Imperial Russian Navy, was killed in the Battle of Sinope in 1853. She was a 17-year-old orphan when the Crimean War broke out in 1853.

Before the war, she worked as a laundress and needlewoman for the personnel of the Russian navy in the Karabelnaya district of Sevastopol, near Sevastopol Shipyard. She left her home when the war broke out to help take care of wounded Russian soldiers on the battlefield during the Battle of Alma (September 1854). She set up a nursing station, using vinegar and strips of her clothing to clean and dress the soldiers' wounds. She was the first Imperial Russian Army sister of charity (Russian: сестра милосердия) during the Crimean War.

The Emperor Nicholas I (died 1855) awarded her the Order of St. Vladimir with a gold medal "for diligence". She was the only non-noble Russian woman to receive this award. She was also given a reward of 1500 silver rubles.

She married Private Maksim Khvorostov in 1855. The couple ran an inn in a village, then moved to Nikolaev, but Dasha eventually returned to Sevastopol where she ran a tavern and worked in a hospital. When she retired, she was presented with an icon of Christ bought with donations from her patients. She died in Shelanga, near her home village, in 1892.

Asteroid 3321 is named in her memory (3321 Dasha 1975 TZ2 Darya Lavrentyevna Mikhailova).

== See also ==
- Holy Cross Society of Sisters of Mercy (ru) - a precursor to the Red Cross active during the Crimean War
