= Siege of Sevastopol (panorama) =

Painting by Franz Roubaud

The Siege of Sevastopol is a painted panorama by the Russian artist Franz Roubaud.

It shows the Allied assault on the Malakhov Battery on 6 (18) June 1855 during the Siege of Sevastopol during the Crimean War, in which 173,000 British and French troops were repulsed by 75,000 Russians. It features portraits of Pavel Nakhimov, the Russian nurse Dasha and Nikolay Pirogov. He painted it between 1902 and 1904. It was unveiled in a specially designed building in 1905, the fiftieth anniversary of the siege. It was damaged during the German-Romanian siege of Sevastopol in 1942 and restored in the 1950s.

== History ==
=== Creation ===
Roubaud began work on the panorama in 1901. Arriving in Sevastopol, he studied the site of the battle and historical documents, talked to participants and eyewitnesses and produced an initial drawing in Saint Petersburg. Shenhena Merten, Frosch and 20 students of the Bavarian Academy of Fine Arts then created the full-size painting which is 115 metres (377 ft) in length and 14 metres (46 ft) high. The finished painting was delivered to Sevastopol in summer 1904 and unveiled to the public on 14 May 1905, the fiftieth anniversary of the defence of the city. The first visitors included Russian veterans of the siege.

=== 1942 ===
The building housing the panorama was badly damaged during the 1942 Siege of Sevastopol, its cupola was shattered and the Panorama itself was partly burnt. At the end of the siege, both the Nazi German war flag and the Romanian national flag were hoisted on the building's shattered cupola.

The evacuation of the painting was carried out on the last ship which left Sevastopol, the destroyer leader Tashkent. The ship withstood all the attacks of enemy aircraft, shot down 2 German aircraft and reached the base of Novorossiysk. The whole team for this unprecedented campaign was awarded with orders and medals.

=== Restoration ===
In the years 1951 - 1954 a team of Soviet artists under Vasily Nikolaevich Yakovlev recreated the panorama on a new canvas, adding several scenes to the original idea.

=== Damage ===
The restored canvas was damaged in a fire at the Museum of Defence of Sebastopol on June 10, 2026, though the original fragments of Roubaud's work, stored separately, escaped harm. Russian authorities alleged a strike by the Ukrainian Armed Forces started the fire.

== Image ==
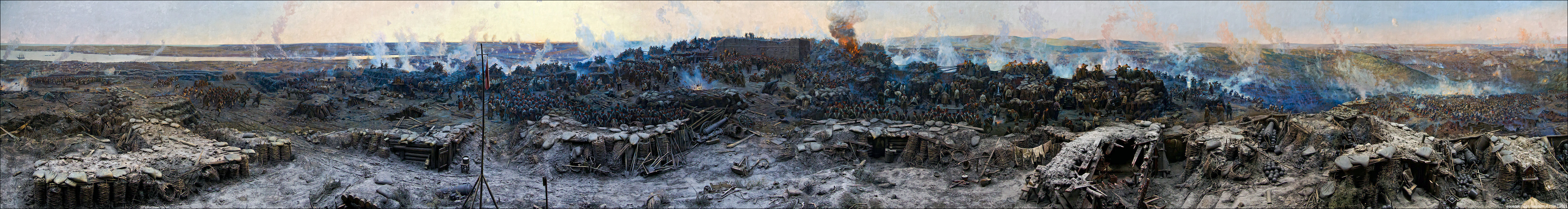
Siege of Sevastopol (1854–1855) by Franz Roubaud

== Gallery ==
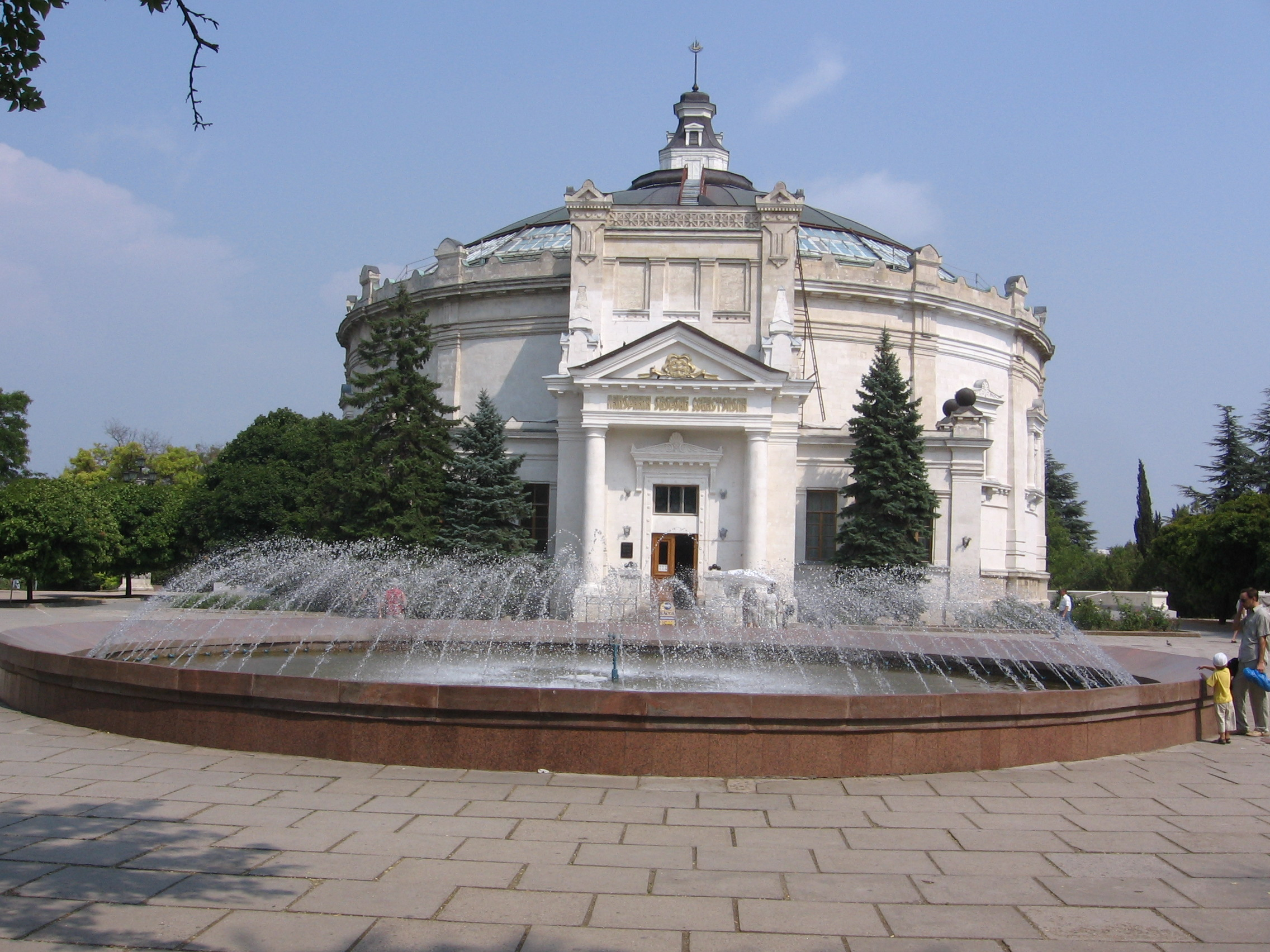
The Defence of Sevastopol Museum, which houses the panorama

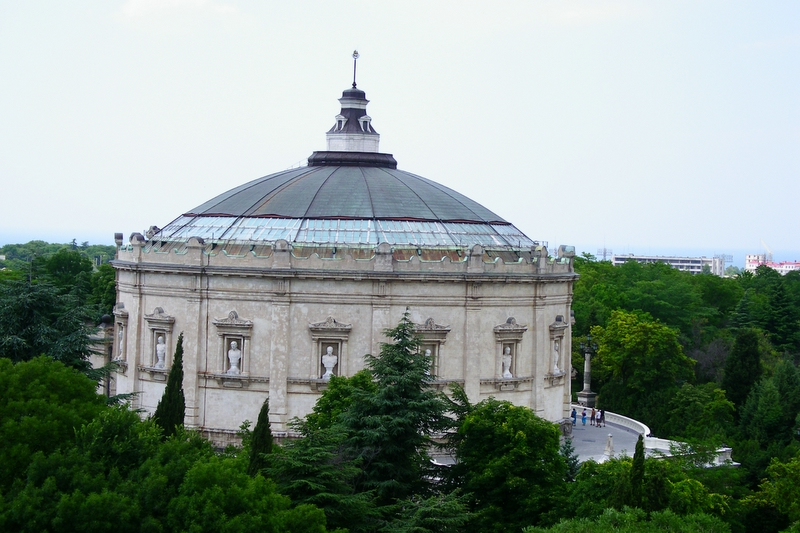
Building "Defense of Sevastopol 1854-1855"

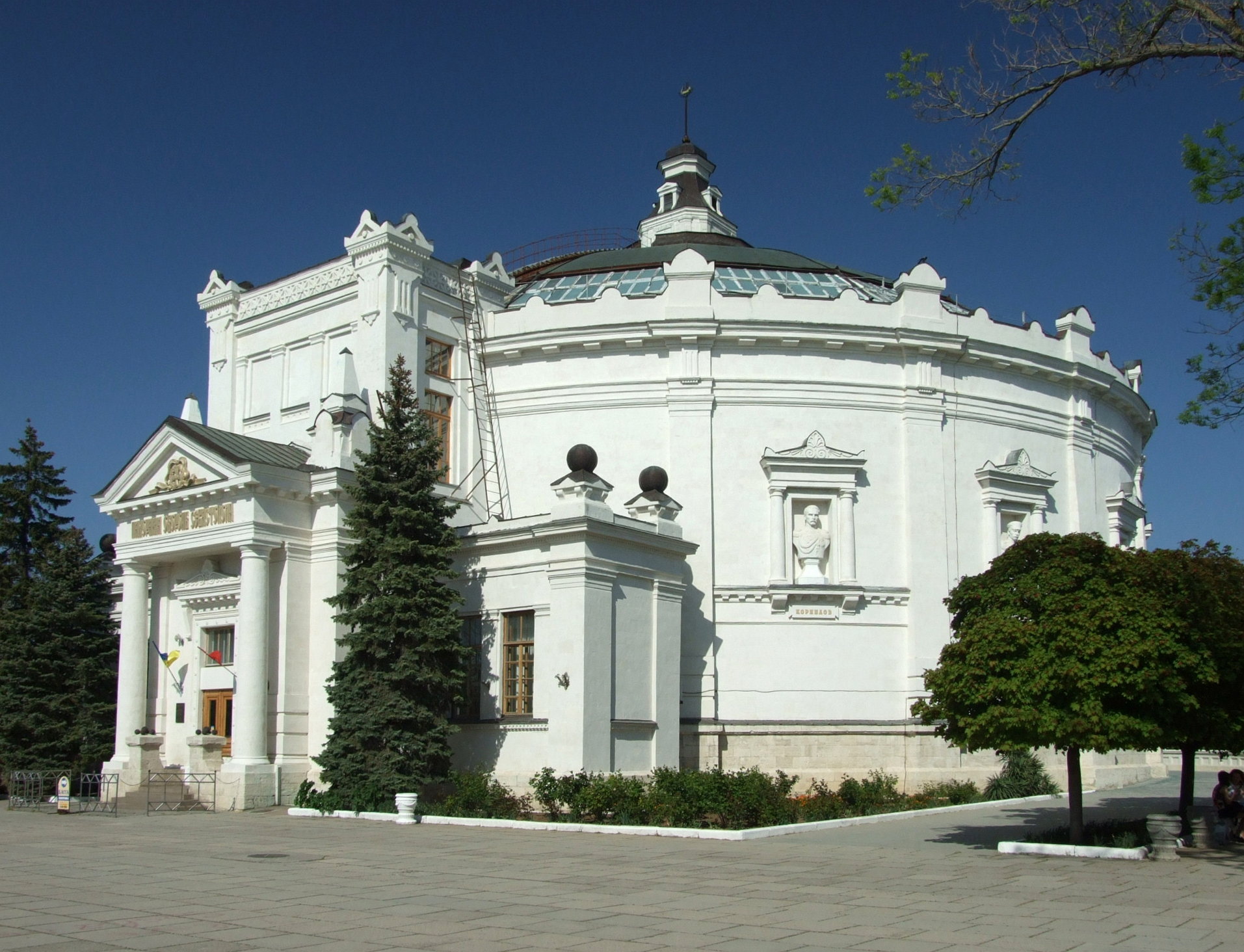
Panorama Museum in 2010

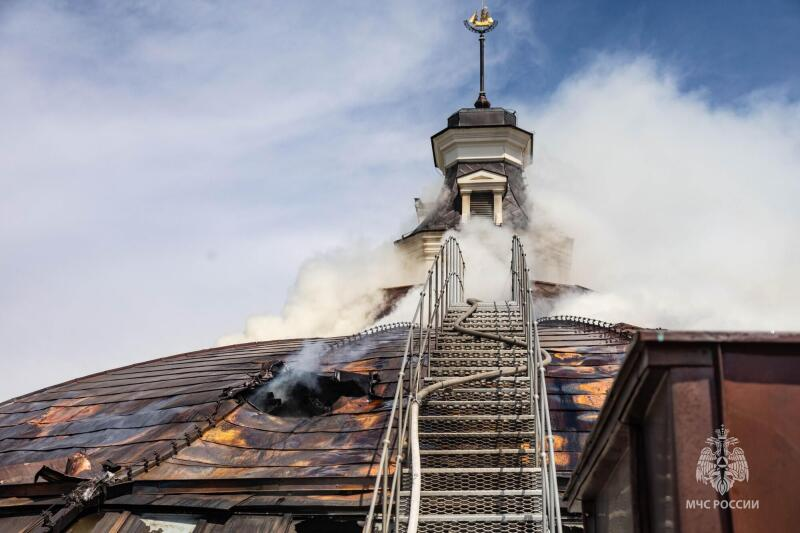
Fire

== Sources ==
- (in Russian) B M Rosseykin, Panorama "Defense of Sevastopol". Guide. Ed. Third, Add. - Simferopol, Krymizdat, 1960. 96.
