= Franz Roubaud =

Russian painter (1856–1928)

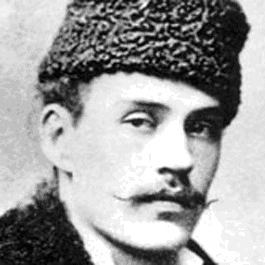
- Born: François Jean Roubaud; 15 June 1856; Odessa, Russian Empire
- Died: 13 March 1928 (aged 71); Munich, Germany
- Education: Member Academy of Arts (1908); Full Member Academy of Arts (1910)
- Notable work: Panoramic painting

Franz Roubaud (Russian: Франц Алексеевич Рубо, romanized: Frants Alekseyevich Rubo; French: François Iwan Roubaud; 15 June 1856 – 13 March 1928) was a Russian painter of French origin who created some of the largest and best known panoramic paintings. He created circular paintings, exposed on a cylindrical surface and viewed from the inside at a lookout point. His paintings were often believed to reproduce the original scene with high fidelity.

== Biography ==
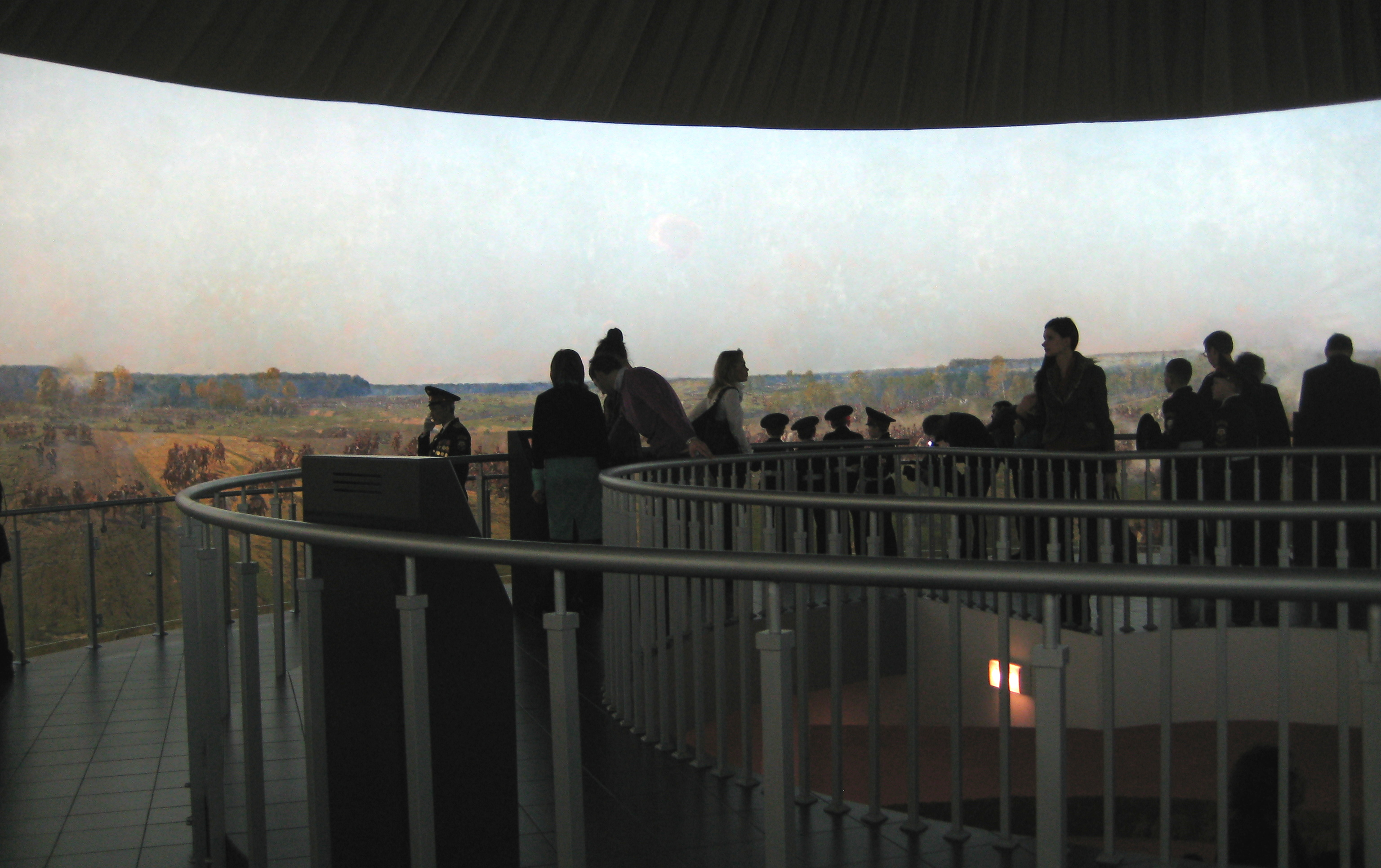
Viewing the panorama painting

Franz (François) Roubaud was born on 15 June 1856 in Odessa to Honoré Fortuné Alexis Roubaud, and his wife Magdeleine (née Sénèque). Franz was the fourth of five children in a Catholic family; his father was a French bookseller and stationer, originally from Marseille, and his mother was a seamstress from Clermont-Ferrand. He began his studies in Odessa; the Odessa Drawing School was his first institution. In 1877, Roubaud went to Munich and studied at the Munich Academy of Fine Arts.

He then settled in Saint Petersburg, working in the Imperial Academy of Arts and painting huge panoramas of historical battles. In 1904–1912 Roubaud taught at the St. Petersburg Academy of Arts as a professor. During this time he painted the Siege of Sevastopol, a panoramic painting. In the mid-19th century, the various panoramic paintings became a fashionable way to depict landscapes and historical events. The panorama was a 360-degree visual medium patented by the artist Robert Barker in 1787. This was a new thing for the time and for the audiences in Europe of this period these paintings were a sensation. The paintings created a new illusion, transporting the viewer into a virtual reality, creating the perception of being physically present in the middle of the events. When standing in the middle of the 360 degree panorama this created the impression of standing in a new environment.

He became renowned thanks to the giant panoramic paintings he executed during his lifetime. Roubaud's works were so large that they required specially built pavilions to exhibit them. These paintings are one of the few panoramas still extant of a popular 19th-century genre. The viewer stands in the centre of the circular panorama, and observes the various scenes whilst walking around and observing the panorama from different viewing angles.

In 1913, Roubaud left Russia for Germany, settling in Munich. After the outbreak of World War I, the German authorities recognized him as a French citizen, but did not intern him, and on 19 December 1914, they granted him German citizenship. He lived in Munich for the rest of his life and died on 13 March 1928.

== Works ==
=== List of works ===
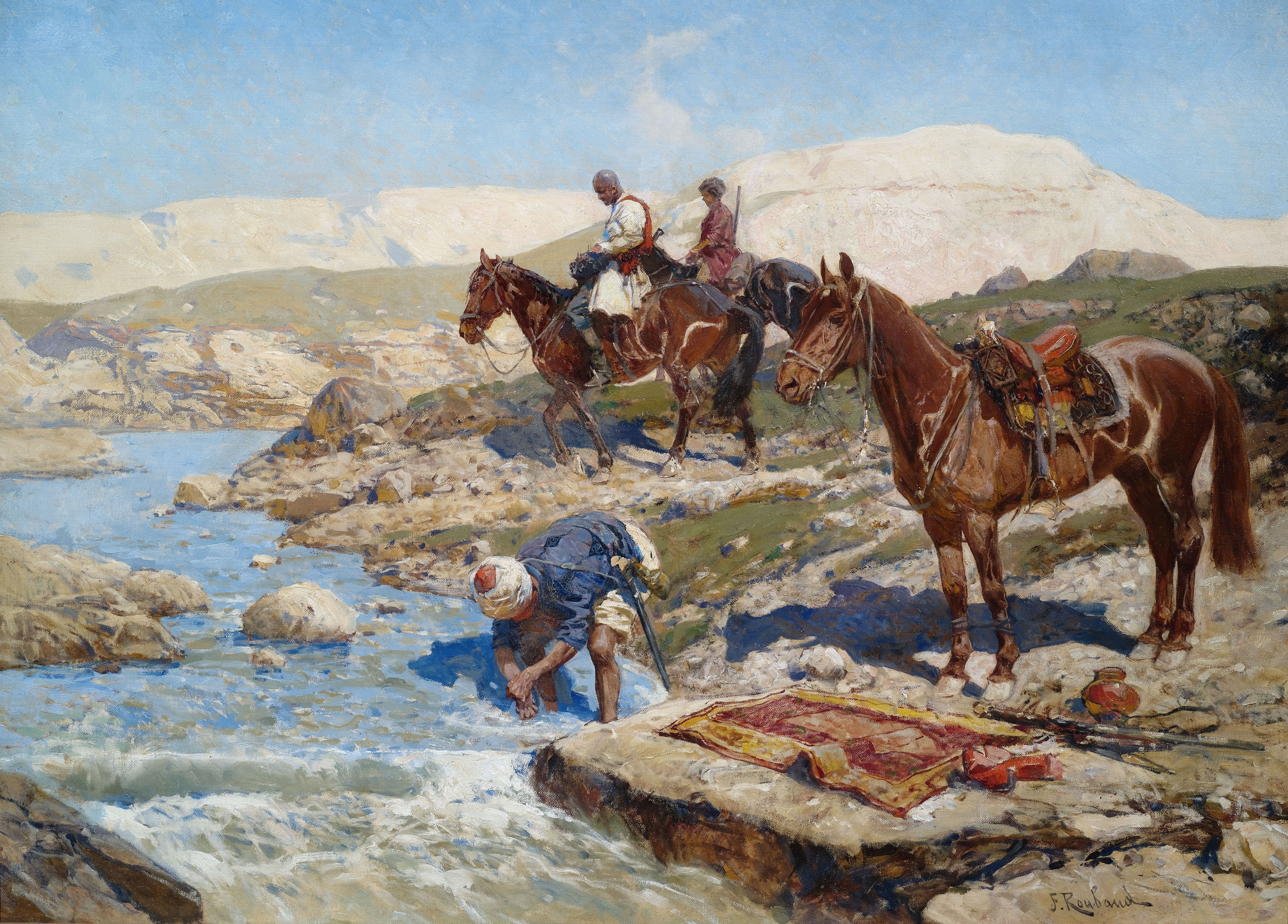
Circassian Horsemen at a River

- Russo-Persian War (1804–1813) – unveiled 1892
- Storm of Achulgo – unveiled 1896, 3 fragments remain in the Dagestan museum of fine arts in Makhachkala, Daghestan
- Siege of Sevastopol (1854) – unveiled in 1905, damaged during the Siege of Sevastopol (1942), restored 1950s
- Battle of Borodino (1812) – unveiled 1911, moved to Poklonnaya Hill in Moscow in 1962

=== Sevastopol Panorama ===
The Sevastopol Panorama is a giant painting depicting the siege of Sevastopol of 1854–55. The painting was exhibited in a rotunda, a special building constructed in a circular shape. The size of the painting is enormous, but it was a necessity for the realistic depiction of military scenes because of the huge number of participants and the wide sweep of the scenery. Roubaud worked on this painting for almost three years, starting in 1901. He researched the historical events by traveling to Sevastopol, reading about the battle itself as well as by reading historical documents that described the different scenes and incidents during the war. He also talked to surviving participants. Roubaud made his first sketches in Saint Petersburg. He kept working on the painting later at the Bavarian Academy of Fine Arts where he decided to use a canvas 14 m high by 115 m long. When he finished the painting, it was displayed in Sevastopol in the summer of 1904, on the fiftieth anniversary of the defence of the city.

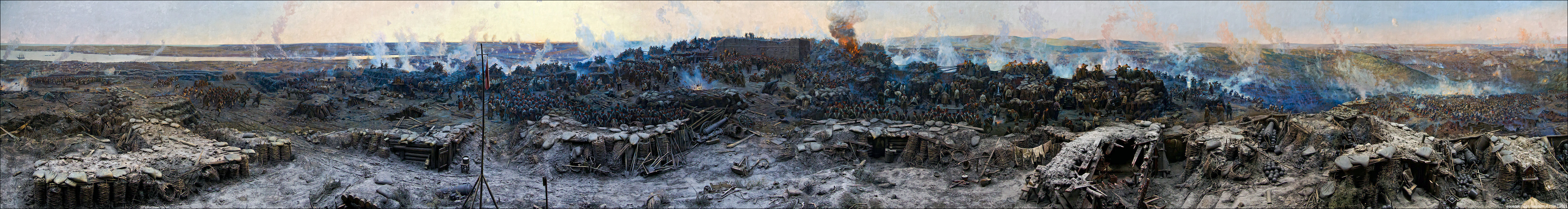
Franz Roubaud Panorama «Siege of Sevastopol (1854–1855)»

=== Battle of Borodino Panorama ===
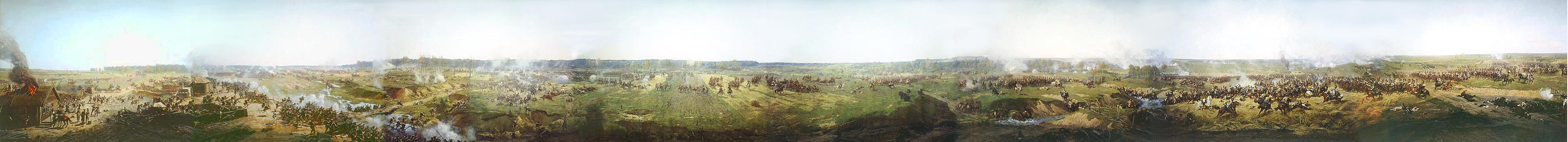
Franz Roubaud Panorama «Battle of Borodino»

=== Other works ===
Selected works

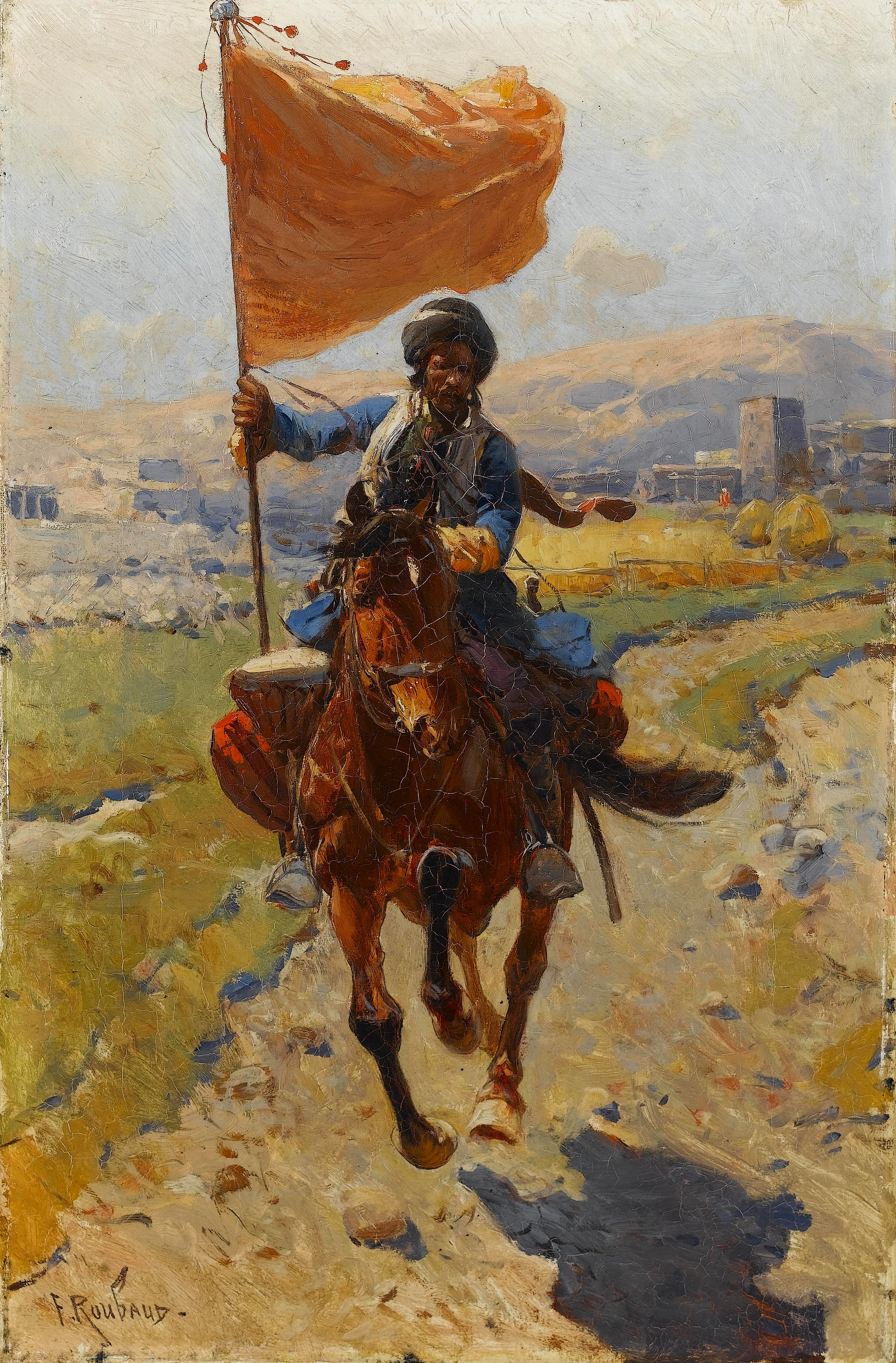
Kirghyz horseman with a red flag

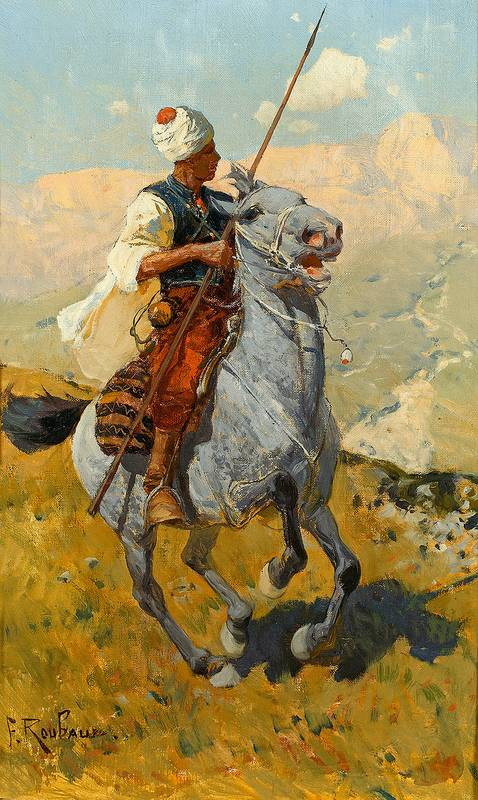
Rider with weapon

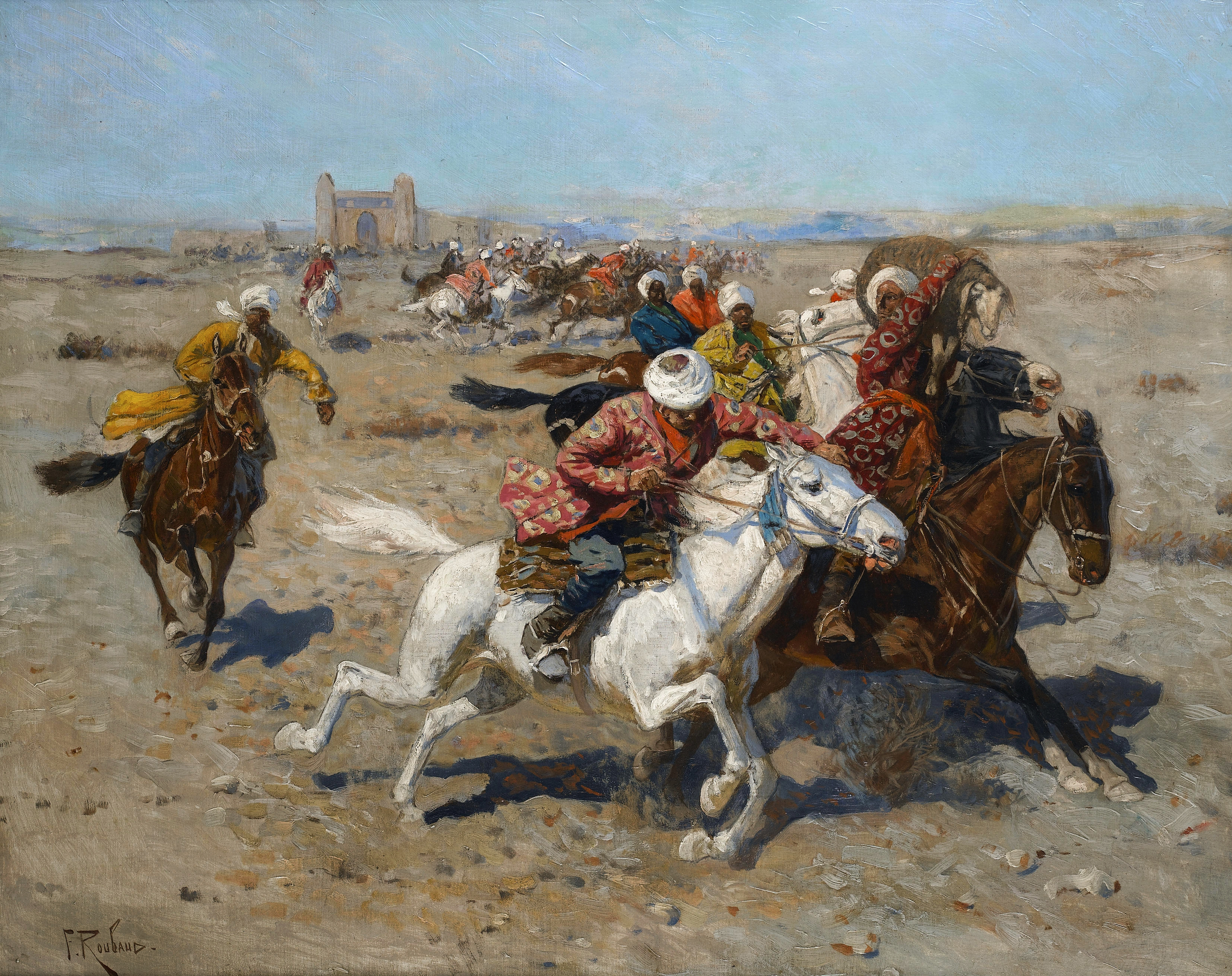
Playing Kokpar

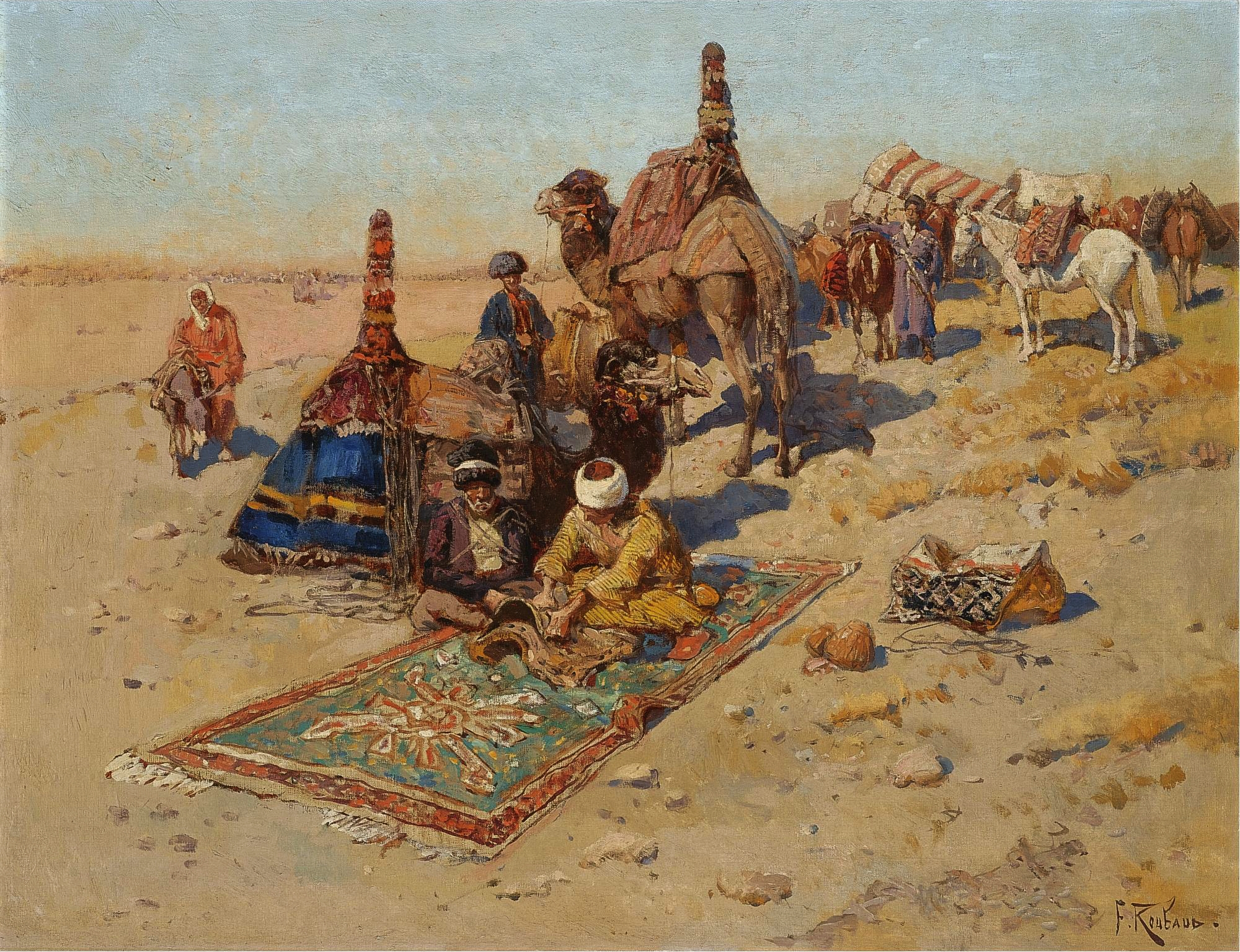
Caucasian scene

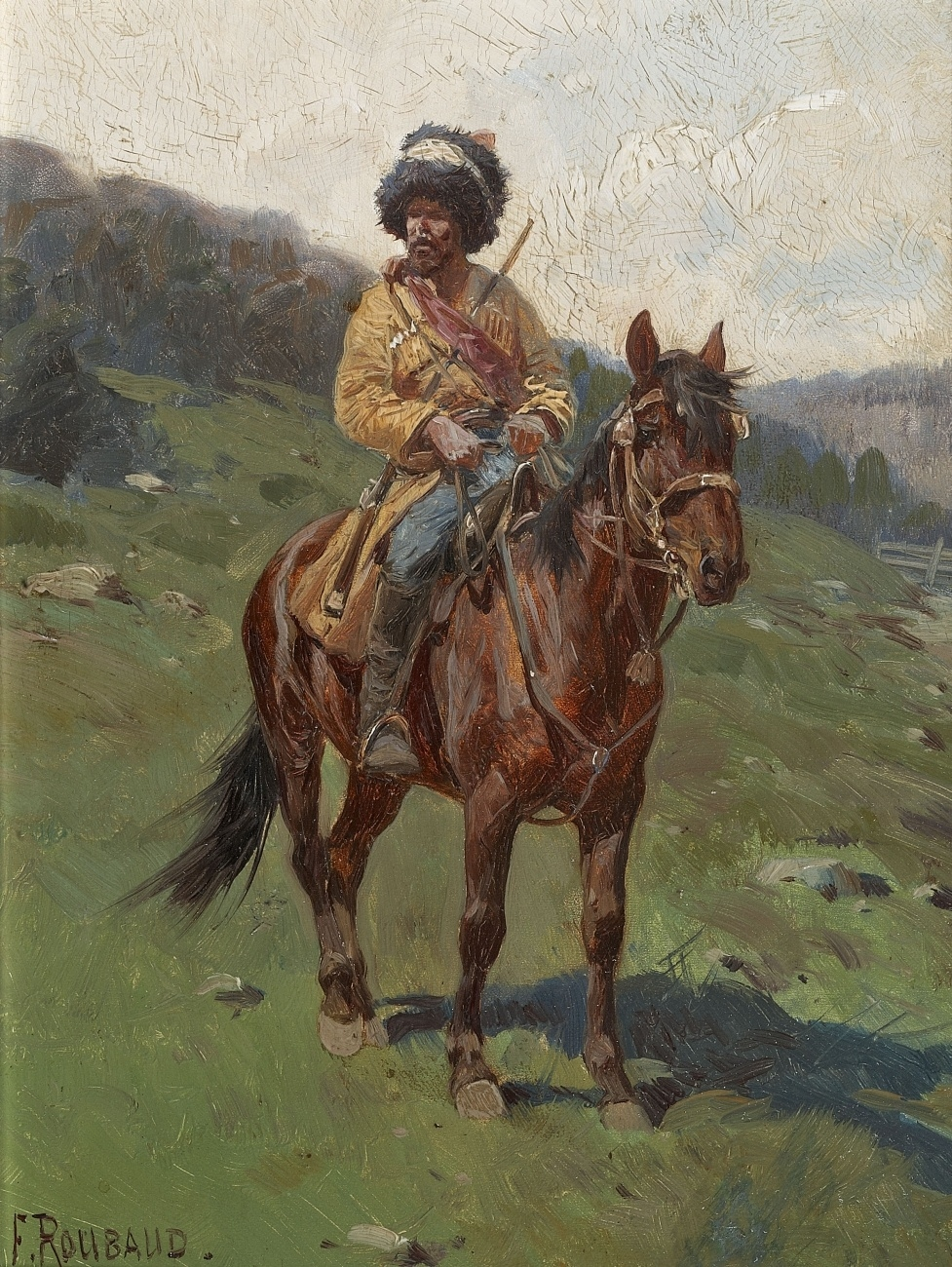
Circassian Horsemen

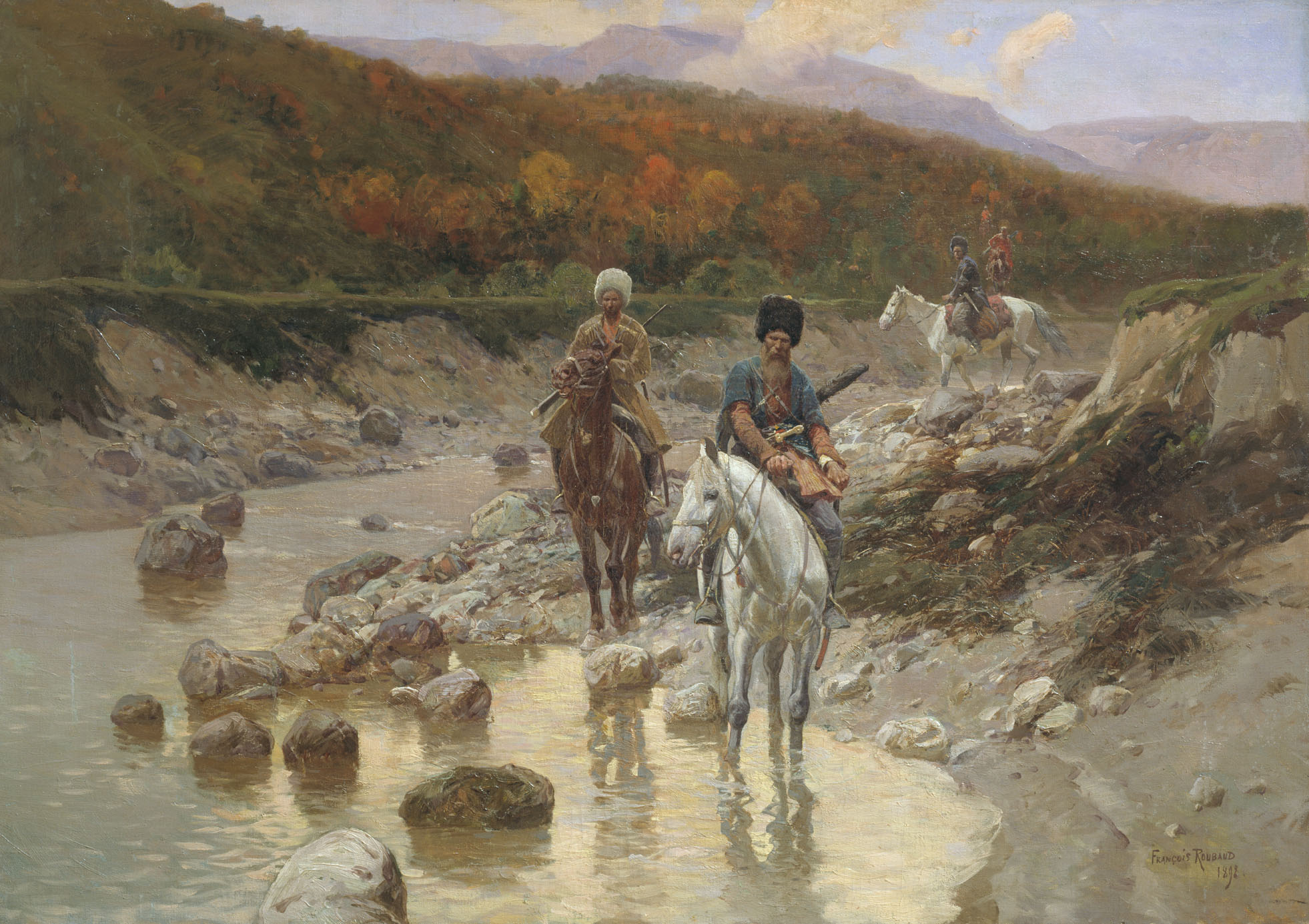
Cossacks near a mountain river

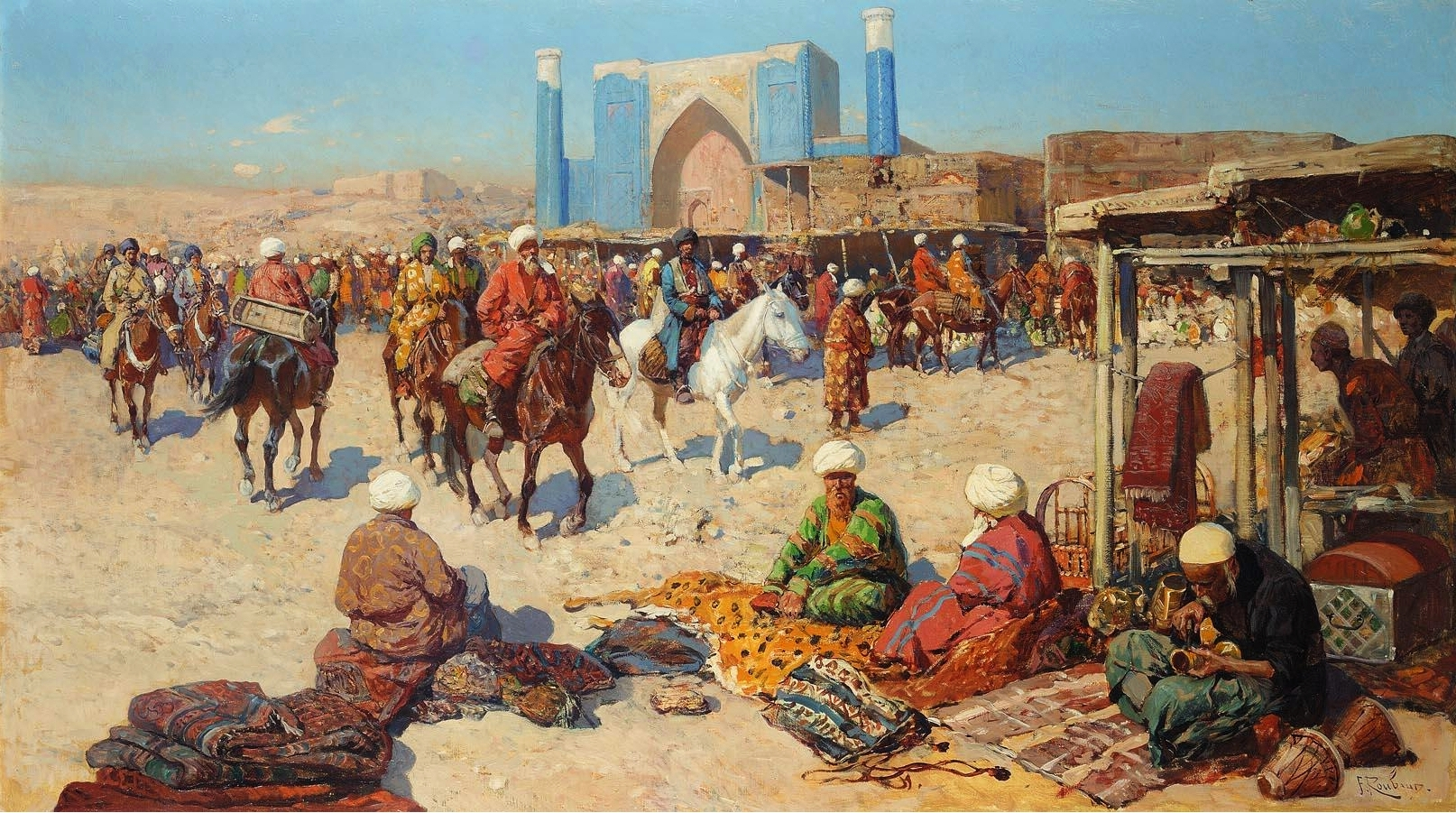
Market day

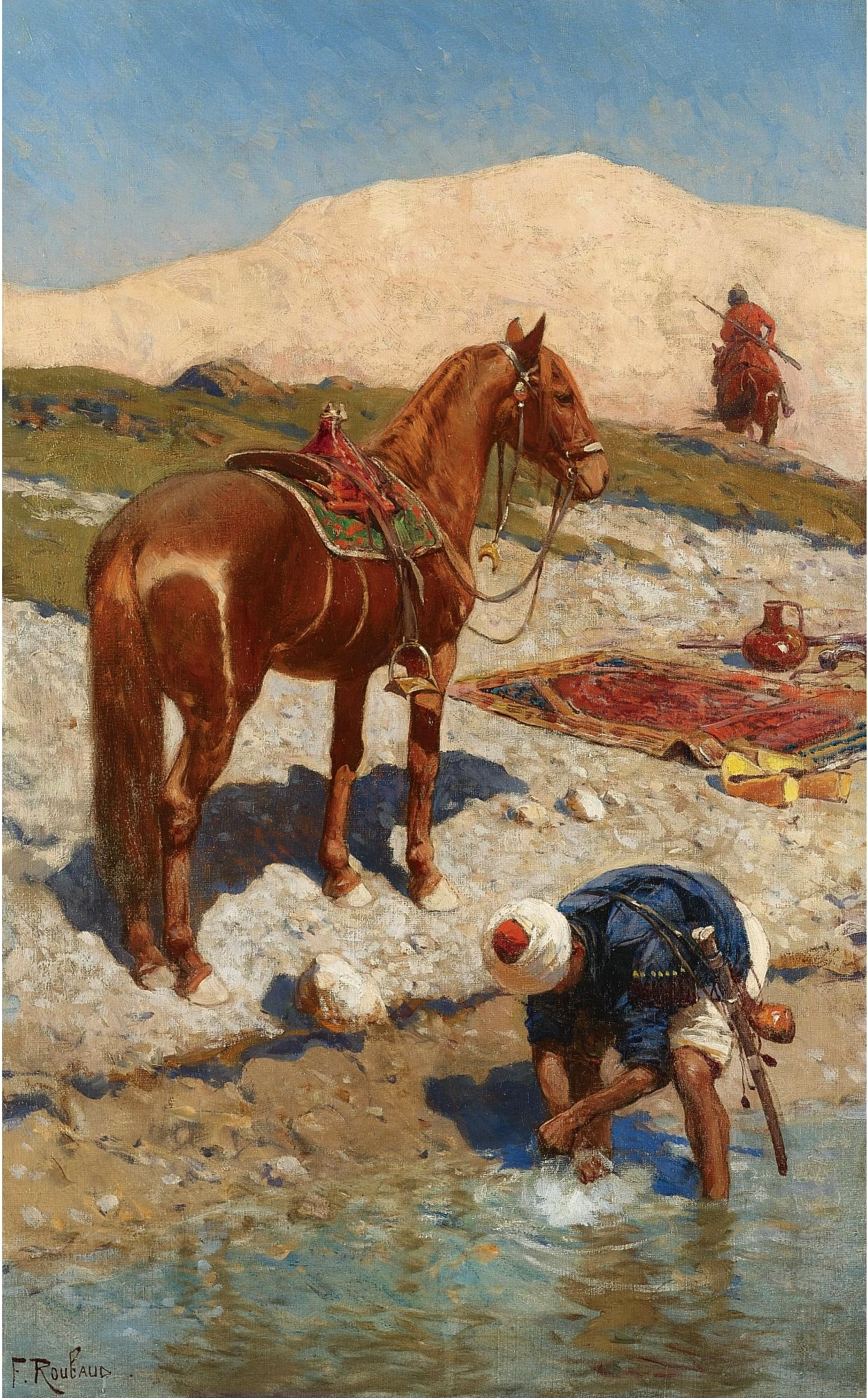
Riverside camp

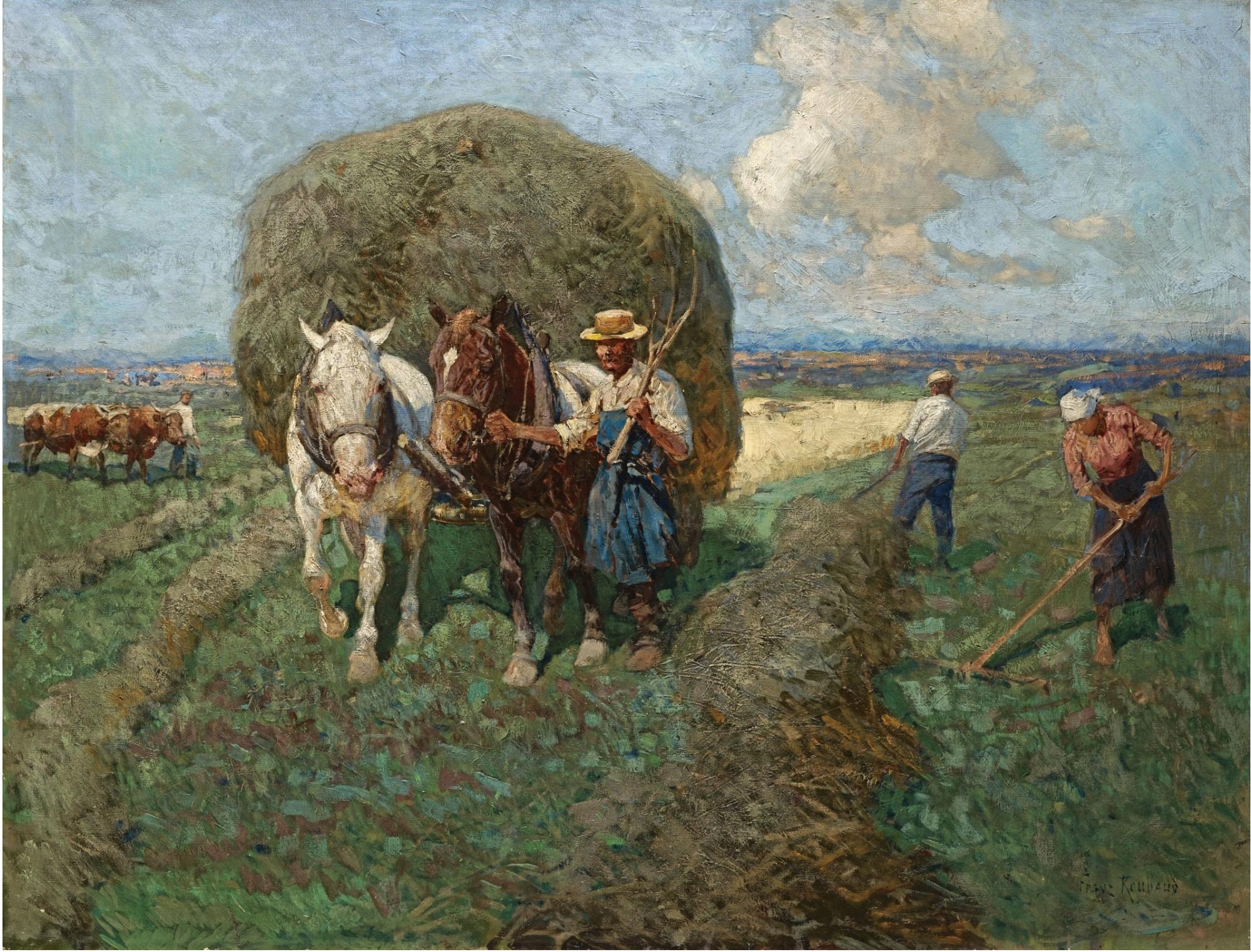
The hay cart

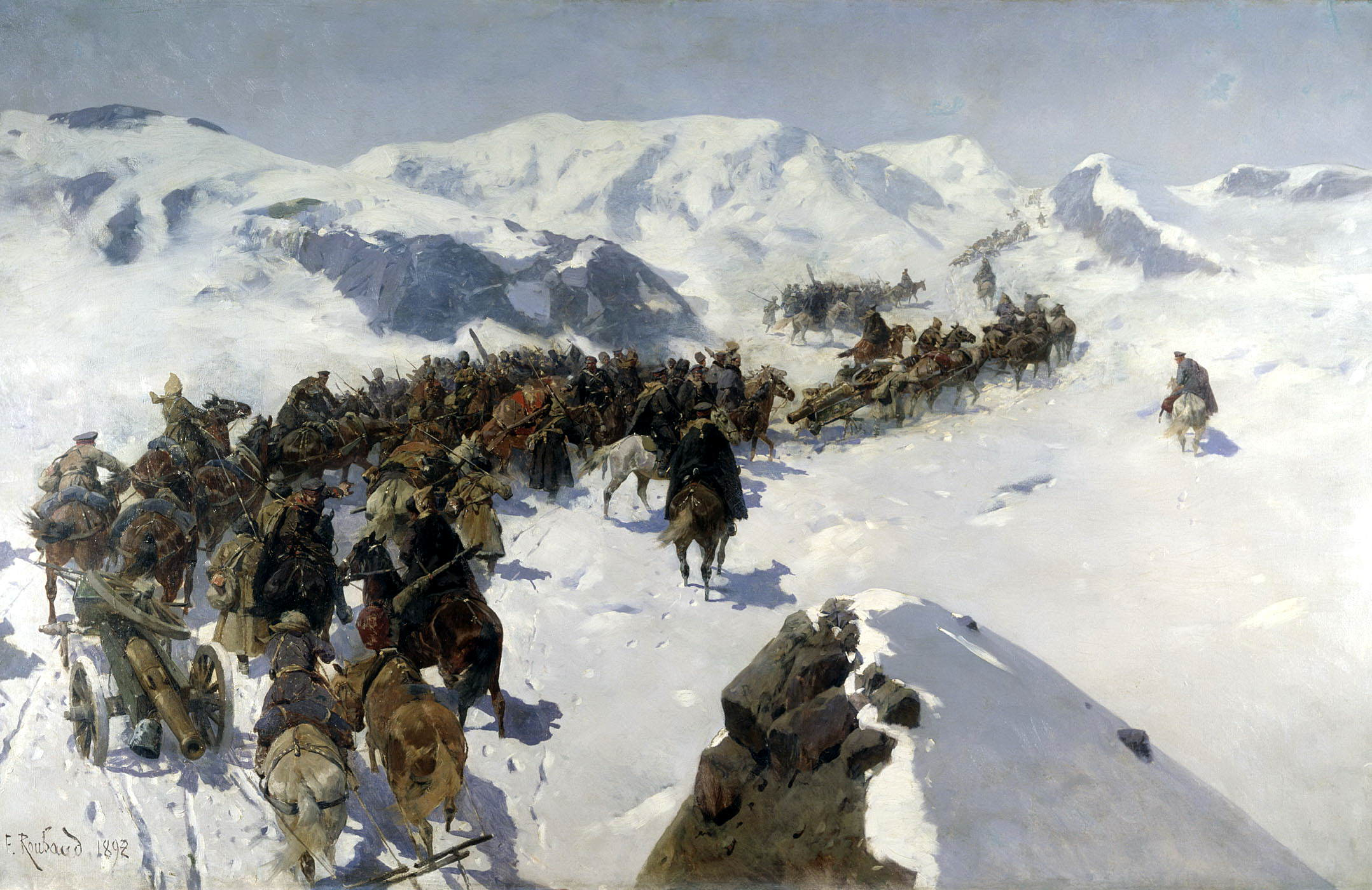
Count Argutinsky crossing the Caucasian range. 1892

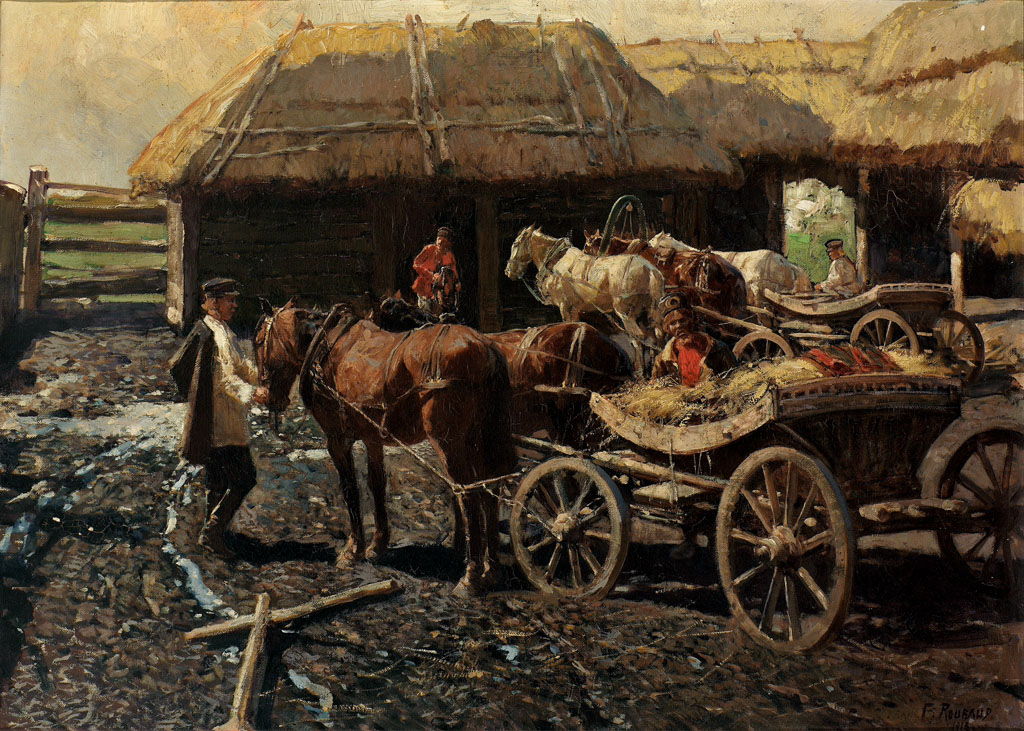
Post station in the Caucasus 1913
