= Russian ship of the line Azov (1826) =

1826 Russian ship of the line

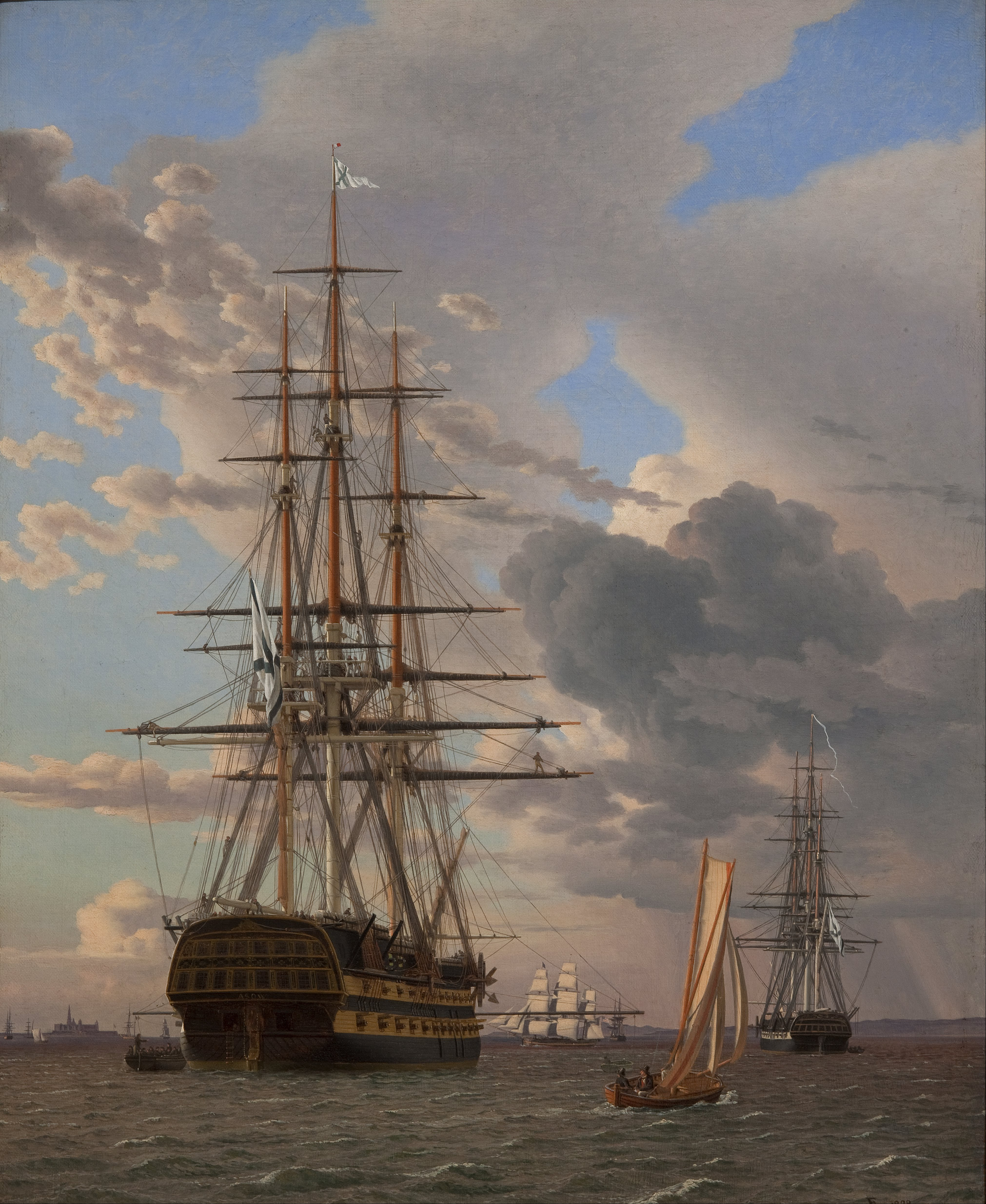
- Azov (left) is depicted in the painting The Russian Ship of the Line "Asow" and a Frigate at Anchor in the Roads of Elsinore by C. W. Eckersberg; oil on canvas, 1828

History

Russian Empire
- Name: Azov
- Namesake: Capture of Azov (1696)
- Builder: Solombala Shipyard (A. M. Kurochkin, V. A. Yershov), Arkhangelsk
- Laid down: November 6 [O.S. October 25] 1825
- Launched: June 7 [O.S. May 26] 1826
- Maiden voyage: 1826
- Fate: Broken up in 1831

General characteristics
- Class & type: 74-gun ship of the line
- Displacement: 3,000 tonnes (2,950 long tons; 3,310 short tons)
- Length: 54.5 m (178 ft 10 in) (upper deck)
- Beam: 14.7 m (48 ft 3 in)
- Depth of hold: 5.86 m (19 ft 3 in)
- Propulsion: Sails (three masts, ship rig)
- Complement: 600
- Armament: 4 × 40-pounder licornes; 24 × 36-pounder long guns; 30 × 24-pounder long guns; 22 × 24-pounder carronades

Azov (Russian: Азов; Russian pre-reform: Азовъ) was a 74-gun ship of the line of the Imperial Russian Navy. Azov was built in 1826 to compensate the losses of the disastrous 1824 Saint Petersburg flood. In the same year Azov, commanded by Mikhail Lazarev, became the flagship of Admiral Login Geiden's First Mediterranean Squadron and sailed to the Aegean on a joint English-French-Russian peacekeeping mission. On October 20 [O.S. October 8] 1827 Azov spearheaded the Russian squadron in the Battle of Navarino. She engaged numerous enemy ships and sustained heavy damage.

After refit at Malta Azov continued her service as Geiden's flagship and enforced naval blockade of Greece and the Dardanelles. In the beginning of 1830 Azov returned to Kronstadt. By this time the ship was literally rotten owing to poor workmanship and combat damage. She was retired in the same year and broken up in 1831 after only four years in service.

Five officers of Azov who fought at Navarino became admirals in the Russian Navy: Captain 1st Rank Mikhail Lazarev, Lieutenant Pavel Nakhimov, Michmans Vladimir Kornilov and Yevfimy Putyatin, and Gardemarin Vladimir Istomin.

== Construction ==
November 19 [O.S. November 7] 1824 Kronstadt, the main base of the Russian Baltic Fleet was swept by the disastrous flood of 1824. Of 28 capital ships moored in the inner harbours of Kotlin Island, only five were spared by the flood, and only three of them were deemed safe for the open seas. Twenty-two capital ships were written off and broken up. Most of them remained afloat when the flood recessed, but were too rotten to be worth salvaging. Alexander I saw no need to resurrect the fleet to its past strength, and in 1825 the shipyards of Arkhangelsk laid down only two new ships: Azov and Ezekiel.

Azov was laid down in November by master shipwright Andrey Kurochkin (1770–1842). By 1825 Kurochkin has practically retired from active work, and construction was managed by his associate Vasily Yershov (1781–1860). Mikhail Lazarev, the Azov's commander, supervised construction on site since February 1826. Lazarev brought forward numerous amendments to the original design; 22 of them materialized in Azov. Azov was launched in June 1826 and in the autumn sailed to its base in Kronstadt. The ship was hailed as the best in Russian Navy and served as a class model for eleven ships built in 1826–1826. Its inner plan was improved compared to previous ships, and its exterior was fitted out to a flagship standard. Azov's brief career proved that all these improvements could not compensate for the lack of quality timber and poor workmanship: the former flagship completely rotted in four years of active service.

== Service ==
=== Kronstadt to Navarino ===
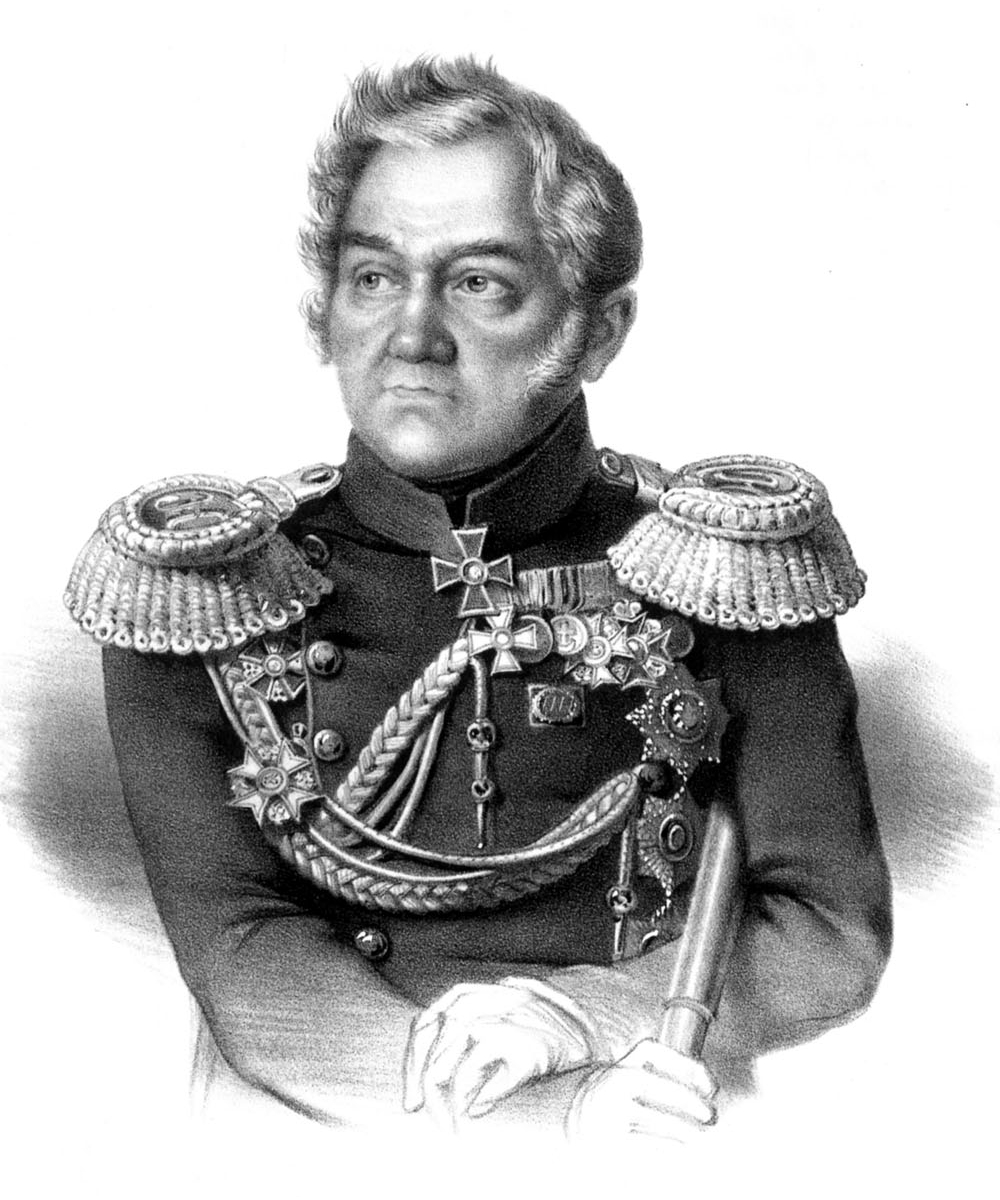
The Adjutant General, Vice Admiral Mikhail Lazarev, in 1834; the Azov's commander in 1826–1827

In the spring of 1827 Nicholas I authorized a brief full-scale exercise of the Baltic Fleet, a last-minute review of available forces before committing them to his Greek project. The fleet consisted of nine ships of the line, eight frigates and four lesser ships. Admiral Dmitry Senyavin raised his flag on the Azov and sailed out to the Baltic on May 23 [O.S. June 4] 1827. Five days later the fleet returned to Kronstadt. May 30 [O.S. June 11] 1827 Senyavin received a top secret order: he had to lead the whole fleet to Portsmouth, England. Upon receiving further heads-up from the Russian ambassador in London Senyavin had to split his fleet in two squadrons. Four ships of the line, four frigates and two brigs of Senyavin's choice would form the new First Mediterranean Squadron, with Login Geiden in command, and proceed to the Mediterranean immediately.

In the evening of June 9 [O.S. June 21], when the fleet was still in Kronstadt, Nicholas I personally visited Azov and literally pushed the fleet into the sea. Azov left Kronstadt with the tsar on board at around 5 a.m.; in the afternoon he boarded his yacht and returned to Saint Petersburg. The fleet sailed forward, reaching Reval on June 13 [O.S. June 25], Bornholm on July 4 [O.S. July 16], Copenhagen on July 7 [O.S. July 19]. Azov and older Gangut proved themselves good seagoers as opposed to heavy and slow Alexander Nevsky and Emmanuel. Winds in the Danish Straits delayed the voyage, and the fleet arrived in Portsmouth only on July 27 [O.S. August 9]. As soon as his ships lined up in the Solent, Senyavin received the news that England, France and Russia have just signed the Treaty of London. On August 6 [O.S. August 17] Senyavin boarded Tsar Constantine and Geiden raised his flag on Azov. The First Mediterranean Squadron, led by Azov, became operational.

Sailing south-west to Cape St. Vincent was quick, but then the squadron ran into strong headwinds. It reached Sicily on September 21 [O.S. September 9]. On the same day Azov suffered its first two casualties: a sailor fell overboard, Michman Domashnenko jumped down to rescue him, both drowned. Geiden lost two more weeks in sailing to Messina to meet with Russian diplomats. At last on October 13 [O.S. October 1] the Russian squadron met the British force of Admiral Edward Codrington south of Zakynthos. On the same day the combined fleet was joined by the French squadron of Admiral Henri de Rigny. According to Geiden's reports, the unusually smooth rendezvous was purely accidental. On the next day the French left for refit; the English and Russian ships sailed south to Methoni and blocked the entrance into the Navarino harbor, the anchorage of the combined Turkish-Egyptian fleet.

Azov and the British flagship HMS Asia took their stations side by side, and the two admirals regularly spoke to each other. De Rigny returned on October 17 [O.S. October 5], which brought the strength of allied fleet to ten ships of the line, nine frigates and four lesser ships. The three admirals decided to enter the harbor in strength and force the Turks and the Egyptians to accept the terms of the Treaty of London. De Rigny and Geiden agreed to obey Codrington, as senior in command, for the whole period of the standoff.

=== Battle of Navarino ===
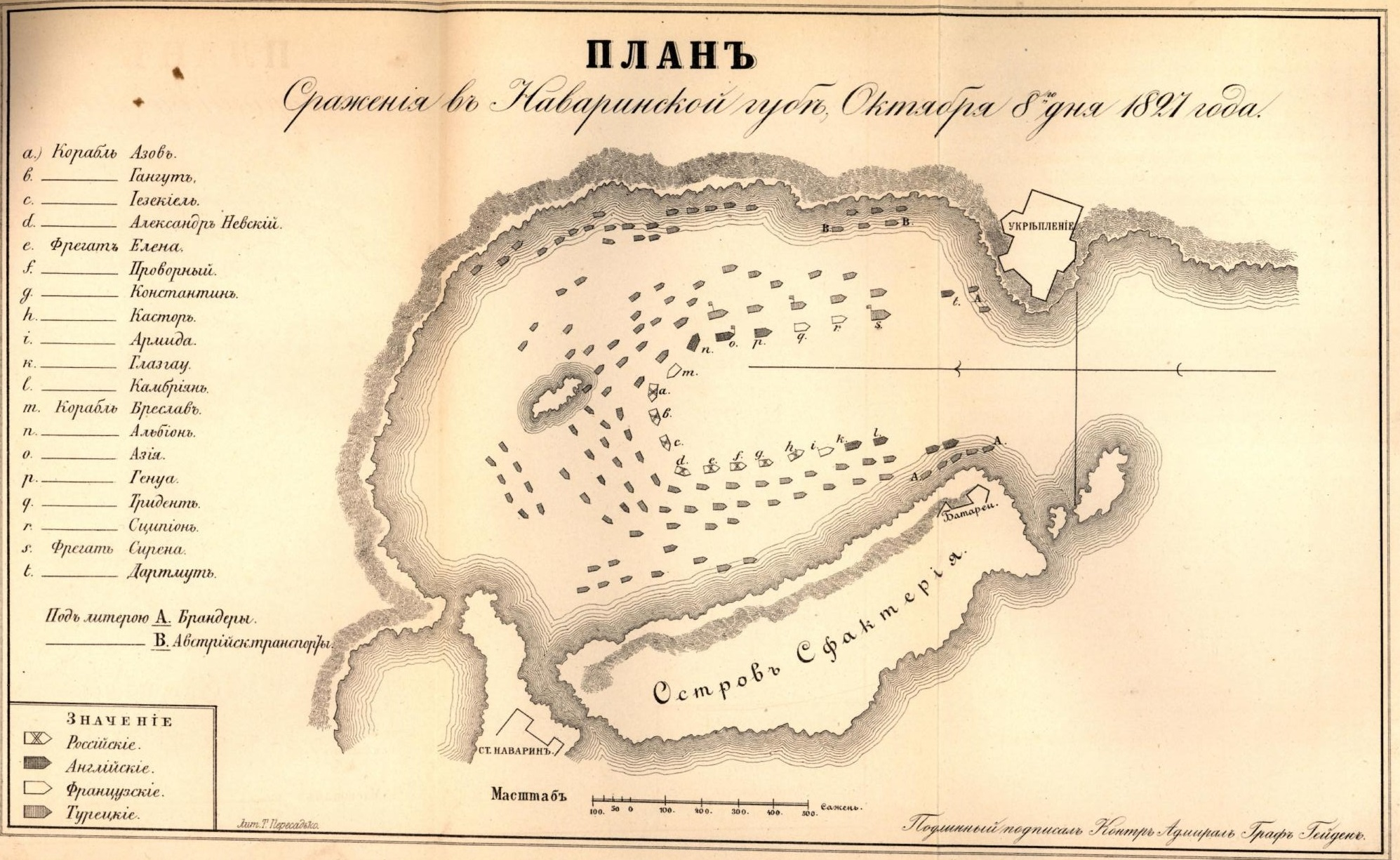
Order of battle, according to Russian sources; Azov (marked a) is in the center of the allied arc of ships

At about 11 a.m. of October 20 [O.S. October 8] a change of wind allowed Codrington to order the move into the harbor. It was agreed that the English and Russian squadrons enter the harbor in parallel lines, followed by the French. At about 1 p.m. Codrington, cautious about the narrow entrance into the harbor, changed the plan and signaled orders to take formation in a single line. The allied fleet took position in an arc side by side with the Turkish fleet. Azov headed to its planned position at the very center of the allied arc, with the rest of the Russian fleet to its port, the English and French battleships to its starboard, and the English frigates in the rear. Soon the Turks fired at a British cutter, killing Lieutenant Fitzroy and igniting an all-out naval battle. Sources disagree on exact timing of events owing to different timekeeping practices and the confusion of the battle; the first shots were marked at either 2:00, 2:20 or even 2:45 p.m.; ship log of Azov recorded them at 2:30. At this moment Azov was still on the move to its planned station and had just escaped the firing range of Turkish coastal artillery. The smoke of English-Turkish shootout obstructed their view to starboard; Azov fired its first shots to port at 2:45.

At 3 p.m. Azov reached its destination, folded her sails and dropped her anchors. Lazarev intended to fight next to HMS Albion, the leftmost ship of the British squadron. To evade heavy smoke that completely blocked the view, Azov dropped anchor to the port of its place in the line. The maneuver created a gap between Azov and Albion, wide enough to fit four Turkish frigates. Eventually they encircled Azov and Albion and both ships suffered abnormally high damage. Geiden noted that for a certain 22-minute interval Azov was engaged by eight enemy ships.

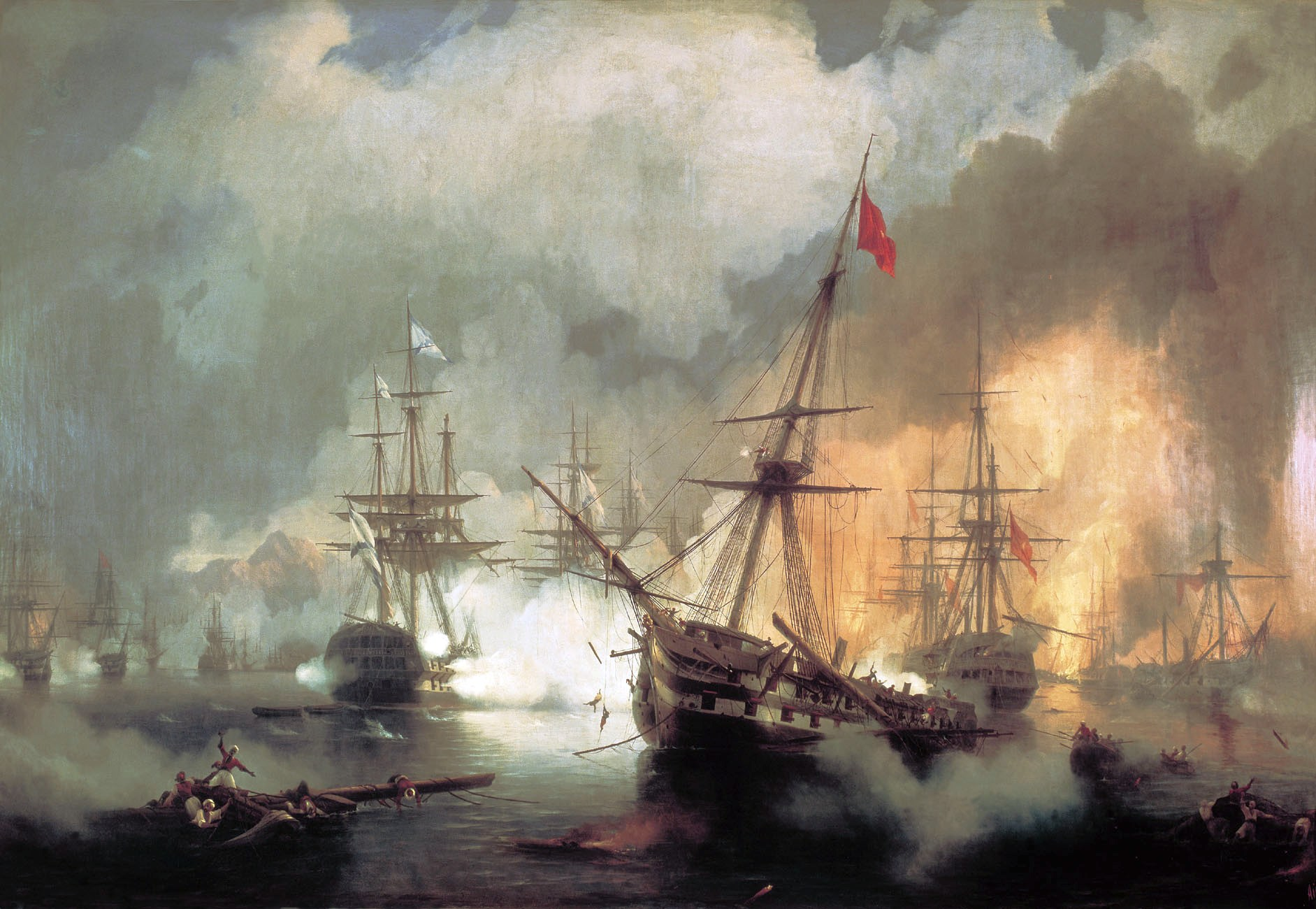
Azov is a large ship on the left in the painting Battle of Navarino by Ivan Aivazovsky

Although Azov was taking hits from different enemy ships, Lazarev concentrated his gunfire on a single target, a 76-gun ship of the line that had earlier engaged Albion. By 3:30 p.m. the enemy ship lost all masts and dropped out of the line. The gap was filled by a two-deck frigate under the flag of Tahir Pasha. At about 4:00 p.m. another frigate, moored next to Tahir's flagship, exploded and disrupted the enemy line of battle. A sudden opportunity allowed Azov to fire both broadsides at point-blank range, and in a short time she sank two frigates and a corvette. Still, Azov remained in an extremely dangerous position. At 4:30 it was relieved by the arrival of the French Breslau, which filled the gap between Azov and Albion and whose first salvo destroyed an Egyptian frigate that fired at Azov. For the remainder of the battle Azov and Breslau fought together, engaging enemy ships one by one. Tahir's frigate returned fire until at least 5:30 p.m. and managed to knock down Azov's third mast; it lost five out of six hundred men and was abandoned. Shortly before 6 p.m. Azov ceased fire: all enemy ships within its reach were destroyed or forced to beach.

Azov's own losses (24 sailors killed, 6 officers and 61 sailors wounded) were the highest among the Russian ships. Likewise, the English and French flagships suffered the highest casualties of their squadrons.

=== Damage and repairs ===
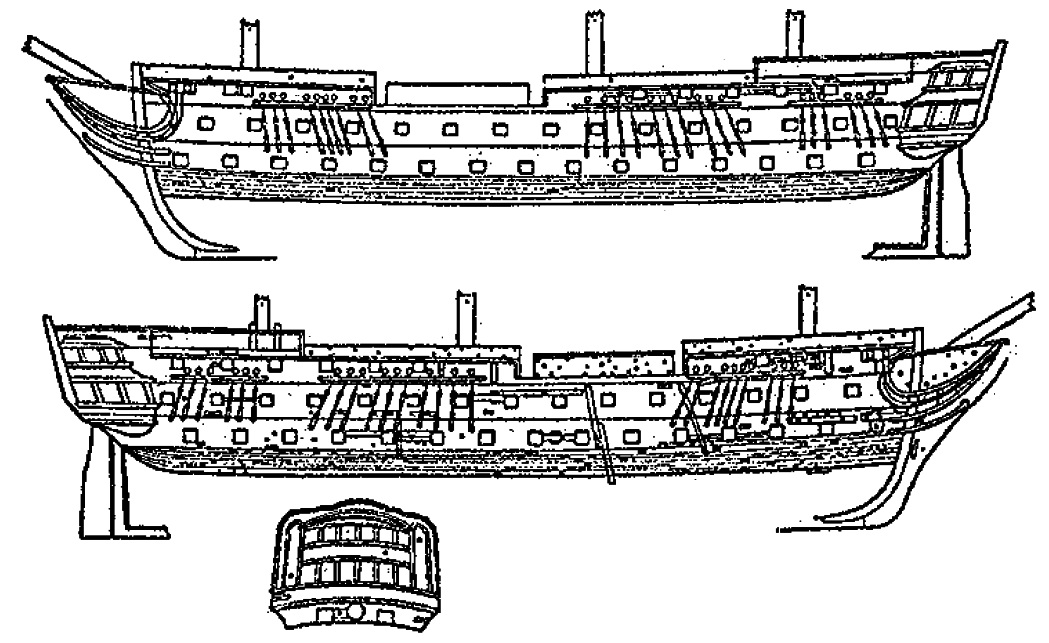
Damage sustained at Navarino

Physical damage to Azov was also the highest: 153 penetrating cannonball hits, seven of them below the water line, and practically destroyed rigging. Geiden mobilized 176 carpenters from other ships to assist repairs of Azov, which took three days. By the end of October 24 [O.S. October 12] it was deemed safe for short sea travel. On the next day the Russian and English ships left the harbor for Malta. The battered Russian fleet, unable to keep pace with Codrington, proceeded with utmost caution and entered the harbor of Valletta on November 9 [O.S. October 27].

It turned out that practically all masts on the Russian ships needed replacement. Azov, as a flagship, received the replacement masts right from the Admiralty of Valletta but the other ships had to order masts from England, which took months. Azov was slowly repaired by its own crew in the harbor; on January 13 [O.S. January 1] 1828 it was towed into the Admiralty dockyards, had its masts replaced, and returned to harbor on February 4 [O.S. January 23]. The Russians were more than satisfied with the workmanship of local repair crews, but the rigging supplied from the Admiralty was too old and dry, prone to unexpected snapping, and had to be replaced at first opportunity.

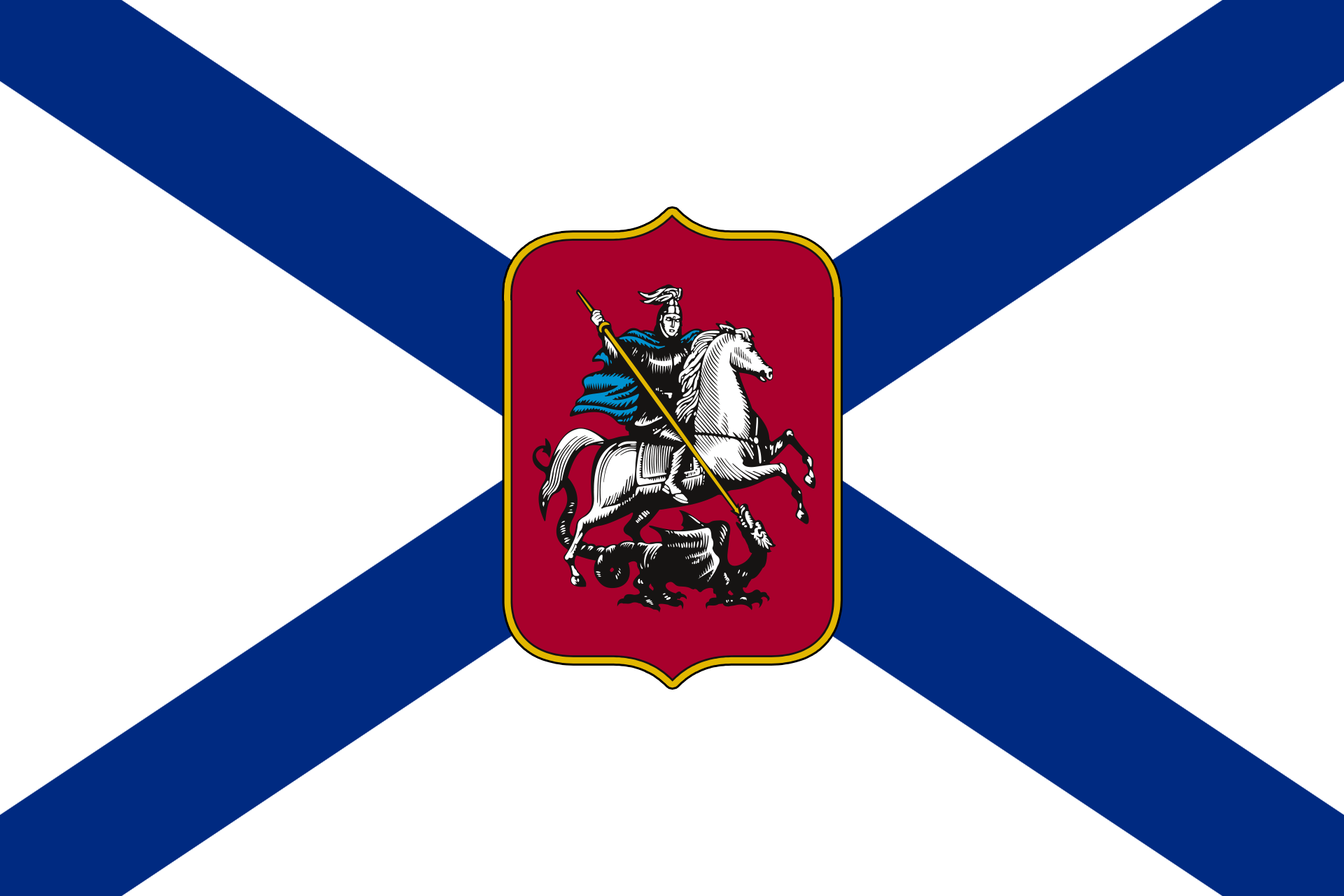
St. George's ensign of the Imperial Russian Navy

At about the same time a courier from Saint Petersburg delivered awards for the Battle of Navarino. The Azov's commander, Mikhail Lazarev, was promoted to counter admiral; Lieutenants Pavel Nakhimov (the future admiral) and Ivan Butenev (who lost his arm in the battle) were awarded the Order of St. George, 4th Class. In March 1828 Azov was awarded a special St. George's ensign. Nicholas I decreed that after Azov's retirement the Russian Navy must perpetually have a ship named Pamiat Azova (Russian: Память Азова, lit. 'In Memory of Azov'), thus the name Azov was effectively retired.

Anchorage at Valletta was a boon for career officers, but the conditions for conscripted sailors, locked in the holds or engaged in hard work, were atrocious. The crew of Alexander Nevsky openly revolted and was promptly suppressed by Geiden. He court-martialled sixteen men for hard work in Siberia; in January–March 1828 they were locked on board the Azov and then sent back to Russia. Azov's own records bear only a slight hint of sailors' discontentment.

=== Naval blockade ===
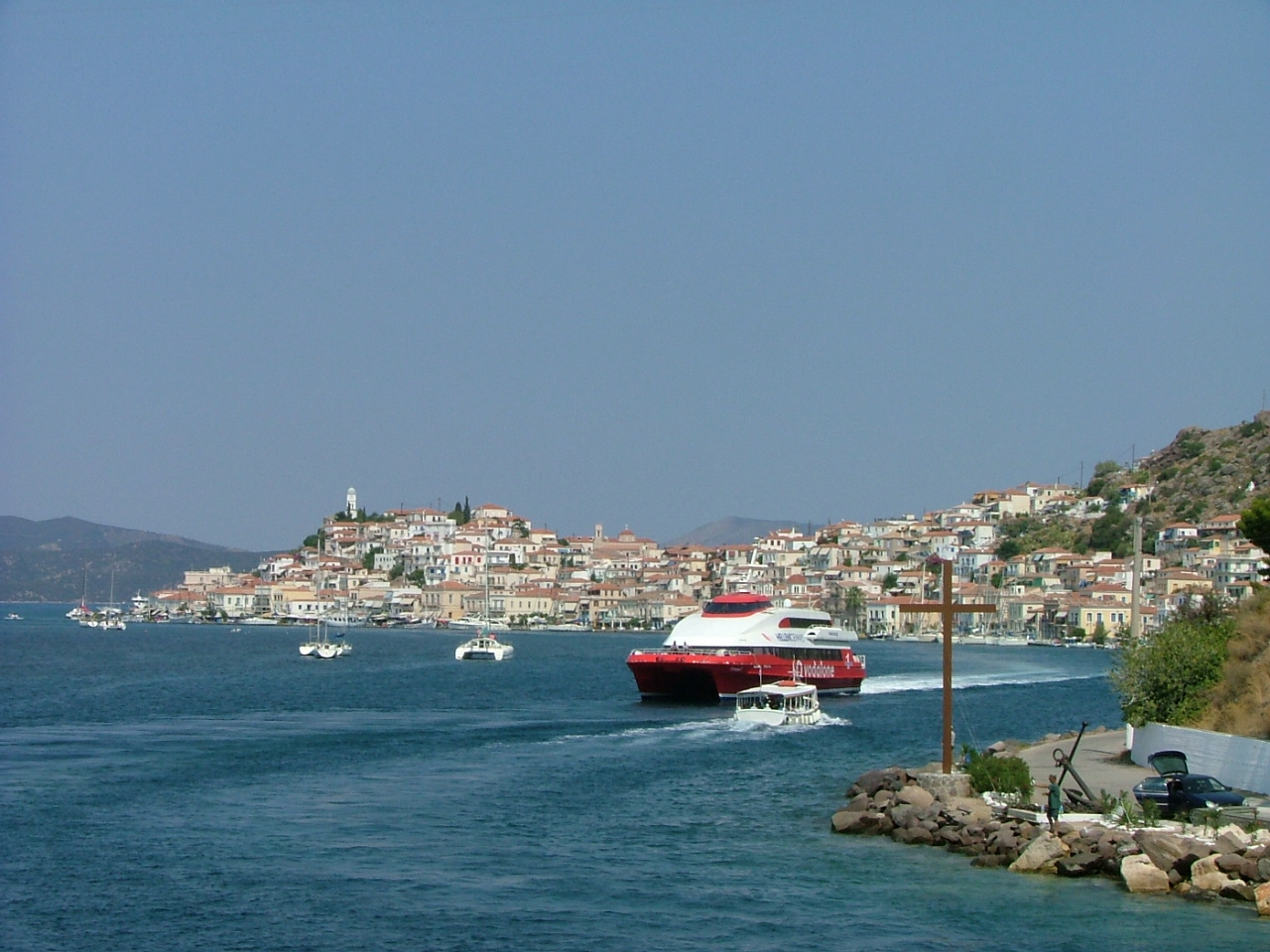
Present-day photo of Poros harbor, the Russian base in 1828–1829

Instructions received by Geiden advised him to continued physical separation of the Turkish-Egyptian ships from Greek mainland. However, the conclusion of the Treaty of Turkmenchay clearly indicated that the Russian Empire prepared for an open war with Turkey. On April 17 [O.S. April 5] 1828 Azov and the rest of the Russian squadron pulled out of Valletta harbor and headed back to Navarino. Geiden left a small force of frigates there and took Azov and Constantine into the Archipelago (his two other capital ships were damaged in a freak collision and retired to Zakynthos for repairs). (Note: This was the only recorded collision of the Mediterranean campaign.) On May 1 [O.S. April 20] Azov rendezvoused with the French squadron at Milo; De Rigny politely visited Azov. Four days later Azov rendezvoused with Ioannis Kapodistrias near Hydra island. (Note: Kapodistrias traveled on board the Russian frigate Yelena. Geiden and Kapodistrias planned to meet at Nafplion but an outbreak of plague compelled them to meet at sea.) In May Geiden moved the fleet to its new base at Poros. The Turks rushed their diplomats and Orthodox bishops to Azov with assurances of peace and compliance, all in vain: on May 27 [O.S. May 15] Geiden received the news that Nicholas I had declared war with Turkey.

For the next two months Azov engaged mostly in diplomacy, carrying Geiden and the Greek officials to meet with De Rigny at Zakynthos and with the new British commander Sir Pulteney Malcolm at Sapientza. In the end of August the allied fleet sailed for a joint blockade of Greece; the English and French blocked Methoni and Koroni, the Russians closed the entrance to Navarino harbor. The blockade compelled Ibrahim Pasha of Egypt to evacuate his troops from Greece. The officers of Azov supervised loading of Egyptian transports and found a large number of Greek women boarding along with their Arab masters; when questioned, the majority of these women indeed preferred to go to Egypt. According to Andrienko, Geiden deliberately stayed aside from any decisive action and left the land phase of the operation to the French. Geiden was obsessed with the upcoming blockade of the Dardanelles and rushed to Malta as soon as was possible (October 10 [O.S. September 29] 1828) to refit Azov and the rest of his squadron and to rendezvous with the Second Mediterranean Squadron of Admiral Pyotr Rikord. Indeed, Rikord (but not the whole of his squadron) was there, and on October 14 [O.S. October 2] the two admirals convened a large War Council on board of Azov. Rikord's force sailed out to the Dardanelles; Azov began the long overdue repairs.

On November 30 [O.S. November 18] Azov and Alexandra sailed out into the Aegean and were caught in a disastrous storm that destroyed many ships all over Europe but spared the Russians. Azov anchored at Poros, then hosting a multilateral diplomatic convention, and continued its repairs. She stayed in Poros until April 1829, when Geiden received intelligence that the Turks planned to break the blockade of the Dardanelles in strength. On April 26 [O.S. April 14] 1829 Azov and the rest of Geiden's ships joined Rikord at Tenedos. The British, French, Dutch and Austrian forces were already there, but the Turks did not show up. (Note: All of Pulteney Malcolm's fleet, four French ships of the line, two Dutch ships, one Austrian frigate.) In June 1829 another rumor, that of Egyptian forces assembling in Alexandria, caused another all-out movement of the international fleet, again with no result. In July Azov represented the Russian Empire at the Greek National Assembly in Nafplion. In September it again sailed to Tenedos, only to learn that the Russian and Ottoman Empires had signed an armistice.

=== Demise and legacy ===
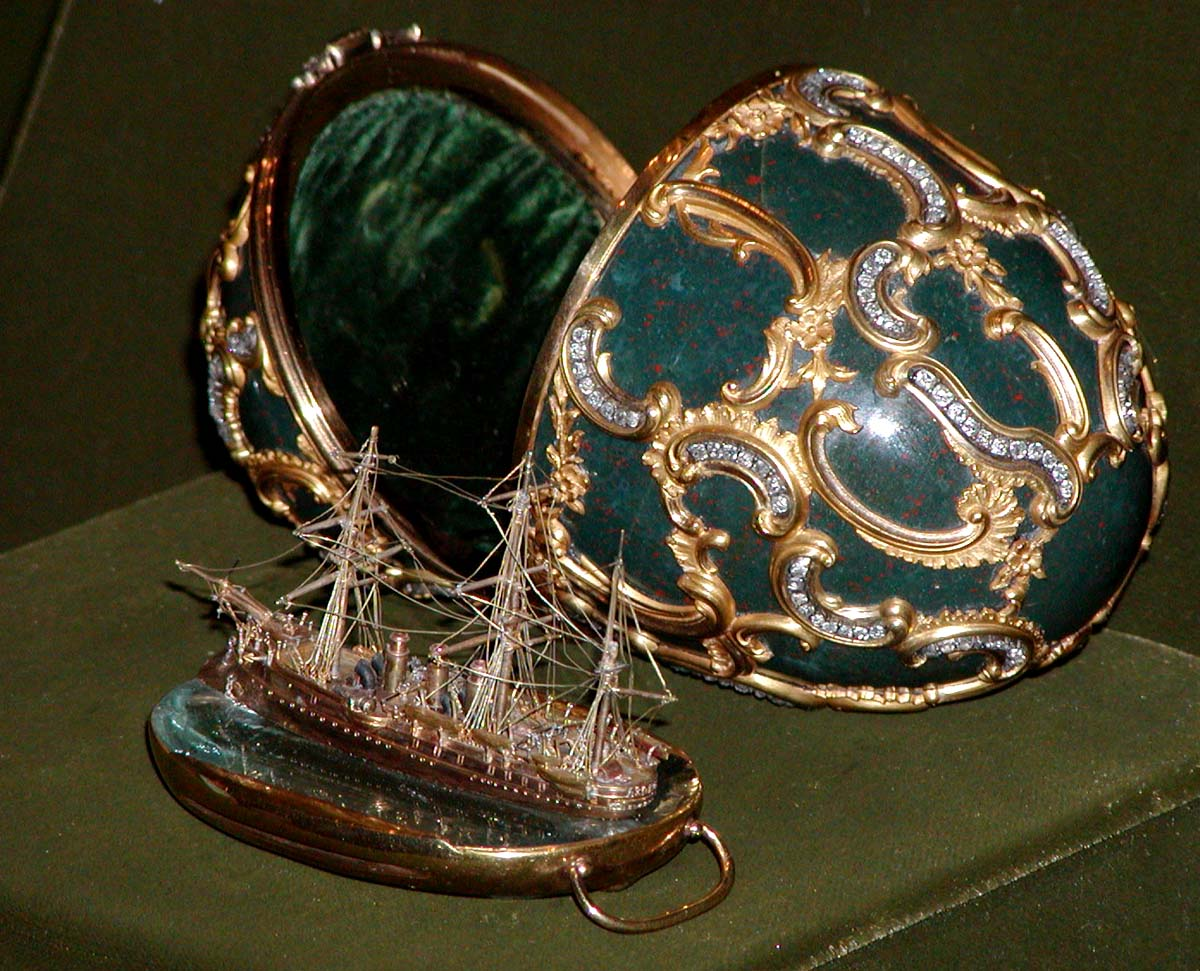
Memory of Azov Egg by jeweller Peter Carl Fabergé, with a miniature replica of the cruiser Pamiat Azova, named so after original Azov

On October 1 [O.S. September 19] 1829 Geiden split his force. Lazarev assumed command over Azov, Ezekiel, Constantine, Alexander Nevsky, four frigates, one corvette and two brigs. One month later the fleet received orders to return to Kronstadt, leaving a small observation force behind. Lazarev sailed out of Poros to Malta on January 29 [O.S. January 17] 1830. The voyage from Malta to Kronstadt took 59 days and could be perfectly uninspiring had it not been for the order to reach Kronstadt on May 1. The urgency forced Lazarev to cross the Baltic when it was still icy, and Azov lost around 200 copper lining sheets in collisions with ice.

Azov reached Kronstadt on May 26 [O.S. May 13] 1830. After less than four years at sea she was rotten beyond salvage. Constantine and Vladimir were just as bad. Lazarev complained that "our ships are not worth the paint [wasted on them]." (Note: Russian: "Cто́ят ли наши корабли хоть краски?") Later historians argued that Azov was written off for its combat damage, but Lazarev himself did not mention it at all. Azov was examined in drydock and condemned in the autumn of 1830 and broken up in 1831. Her twin Ezekiel, built in the same year by the same yard, sailed for ten more years. The older Gangut, converted into a steamer, served until 1891; the small 16-gun brig Akhilles, built in Sveaborg in 1819, served until 1857.

The Imperial Navy had three ships named after Azov – the 86-gun Pamiat Azova (1831, broken up in 1854); the 74-gun Pamiat Azova (1848, broken up in 1863); and the protected cruiser Pamiat Azova (1890, sunk in 1919). Modern Russian Navy has a Ropucha-class landing ship named Azov (built in 1990).
