= The Russian Ship of the Line "Asow" and a Frigate at Anchor in the Roads of Elsinore =

Painting by Christoffer Wilhelm Eckersberg

The Russian Ship of the line "Asow" and a Frigate at Anchor in the roads of Elsinore
- Det russiske linieskib "Asow" og en fregat til ankers på Helsingørs red (Danish)
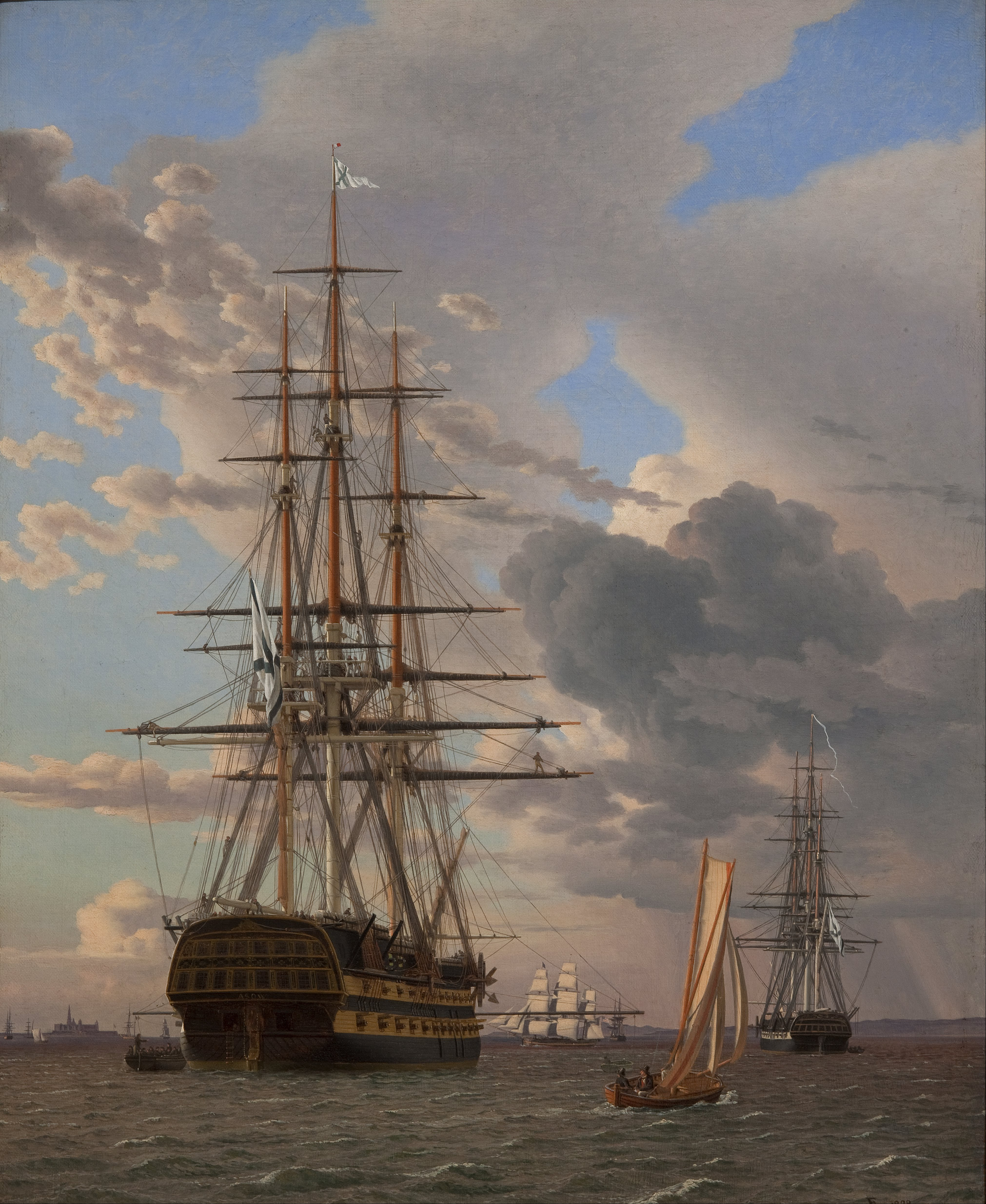
- Artist: C. W. Eckersberg
- Year: 1828
- Medium: Oil on canvas
- Dimensions: 63 cm × 51 cm (25 in × 20 in)
- Location: National Gallery of Denmark, Copenhagen

The Russian Ship of the line "Asow" and a Frigate at Anchor in the roads of Elsinore is an oil-on-canvas painting by the Danish painter C. W. Eckersberg. It was painted in 1828.

The work is not an accurate rendition of the scene but a construction, using more than one event as the basis for the painting. For instance, Eckersberg moved the scene from Copenhagen where he had inspected such ships to Elsinore as is evident in the picture as Kronborg is seen in the background.

Eckersberg was very meticulous in preparing the painting, however. He studied these ship types beforehand, borrowing technical drawings from the naval dockyard. The process is documented in Eckersberg's diary.

== See also ==
- Russian ship of the line Azov (1826)
