= List of Russian people =

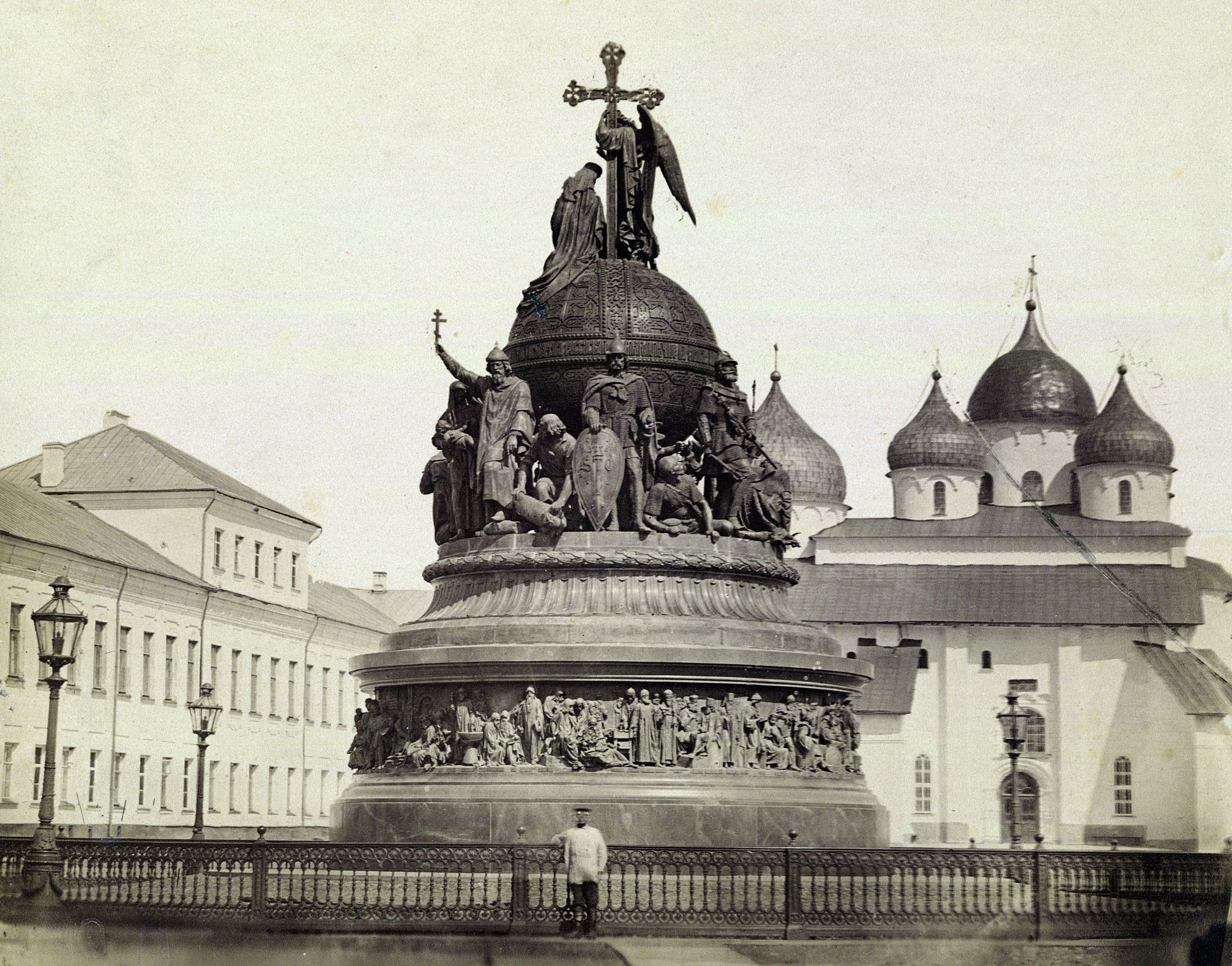
The Millennium of Russia monument in Veliky Novgorod, featuring the statues and reliefs of the most celebrated people in the first 1000 years of Russian history

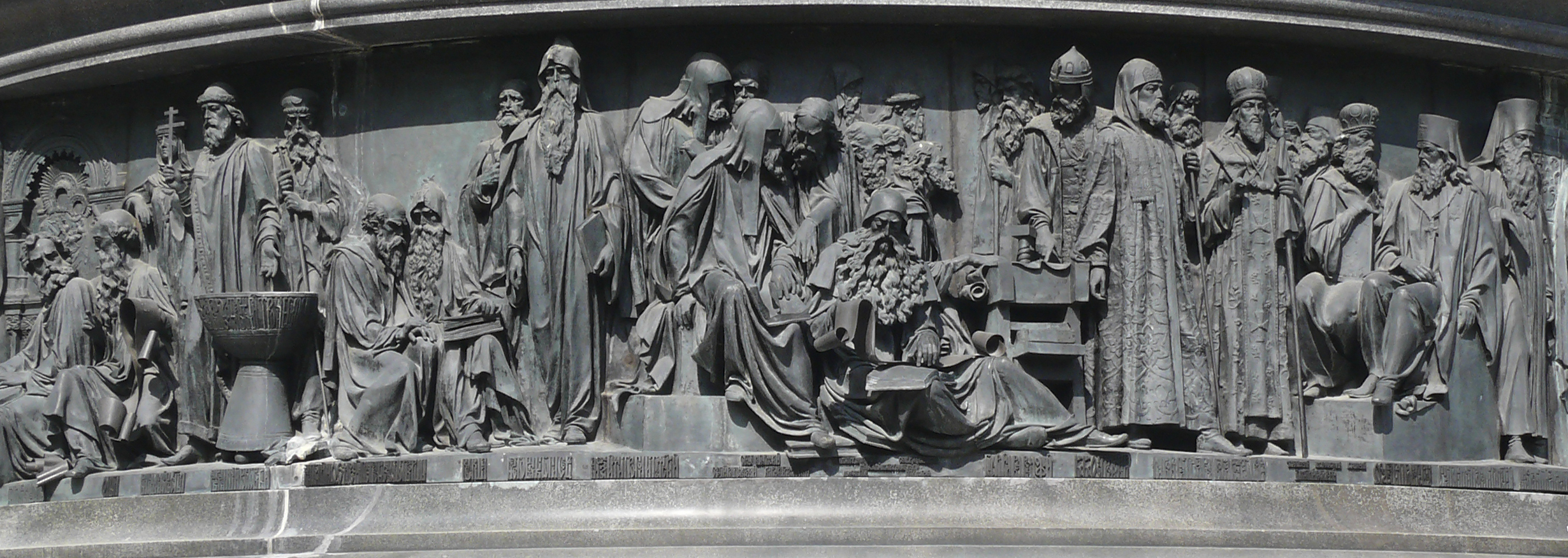
Men of enlightenment at the Millennium of Russia

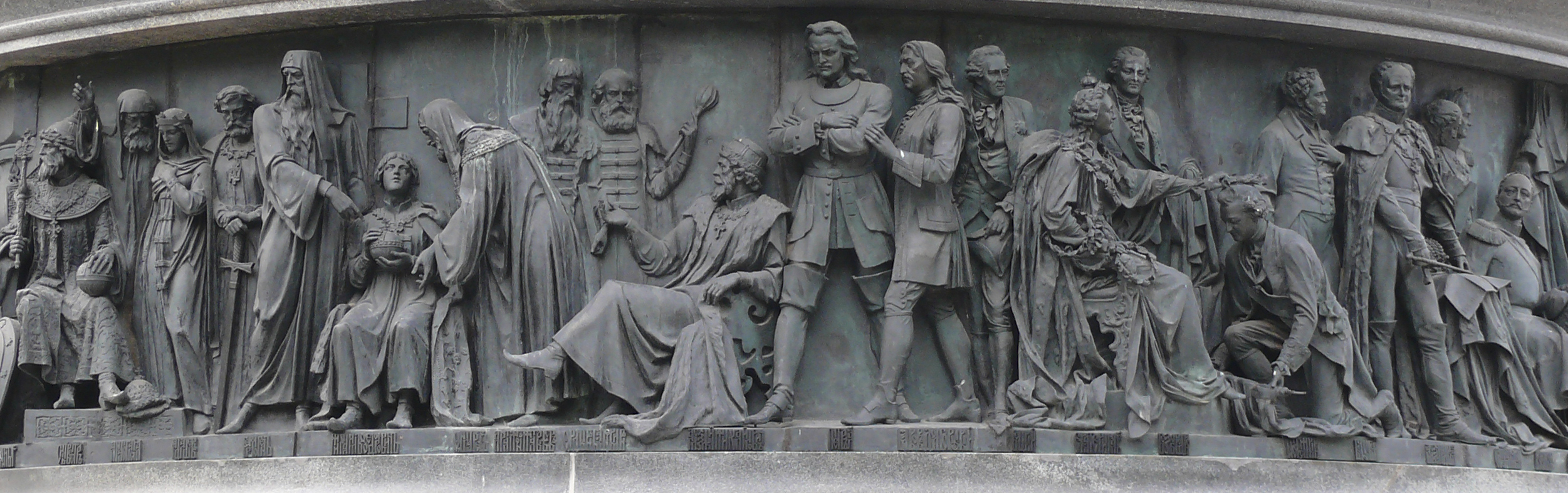
Statesmen at the Millennium of Russia

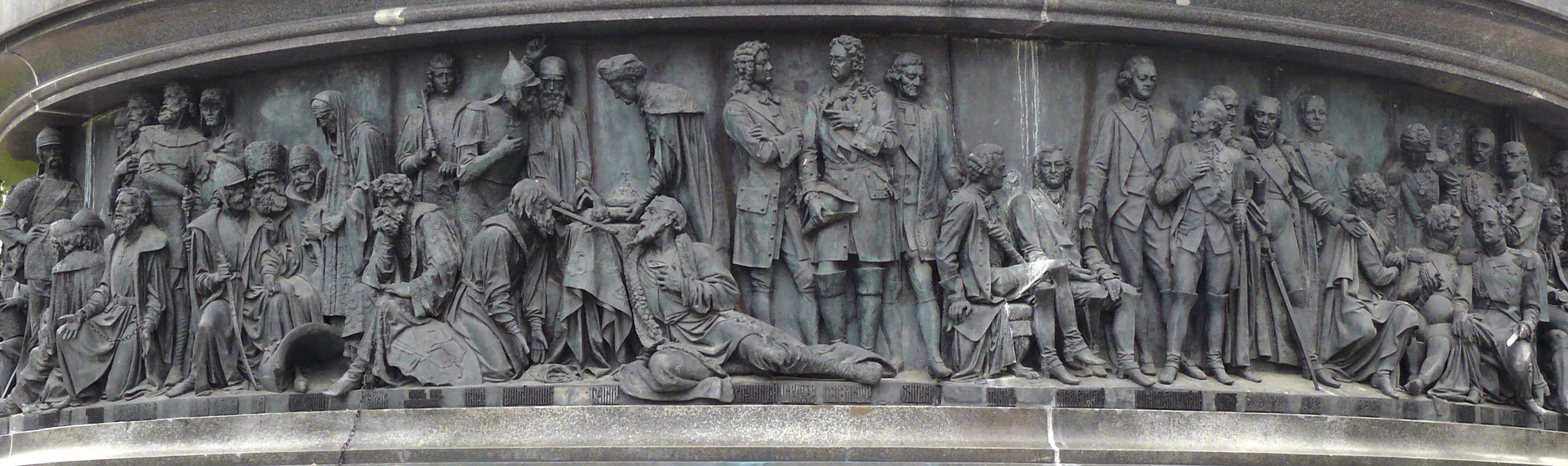
Military men and heroes at the Millennium of Russia

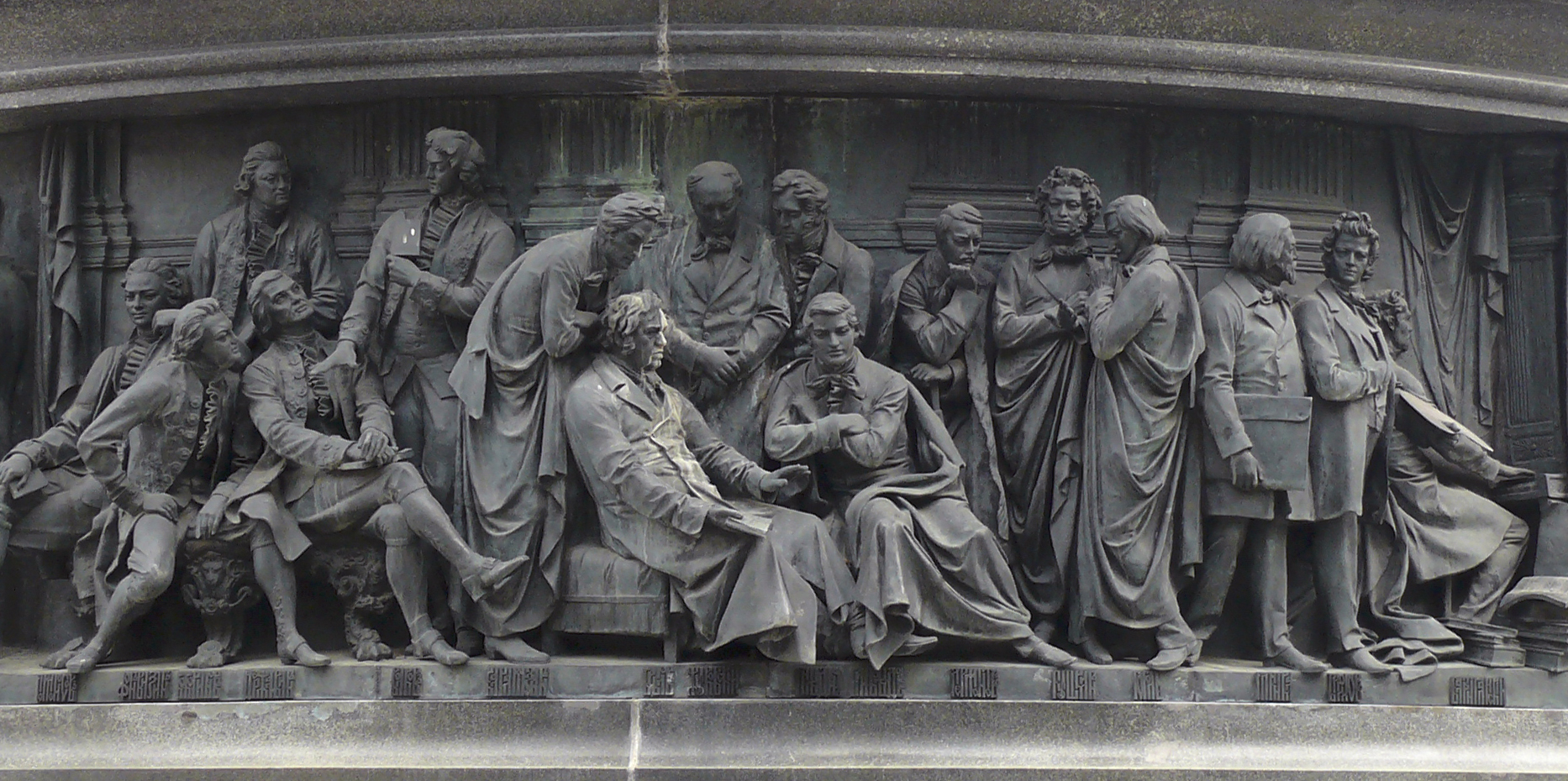
Writers and artists at the Millennium of Russia

This is a list of people associated with the modern Russian Federation, the Soviet Union, Imperial Russia, Russian Tsardom, the Grand Duchy of Moscow, Kievan Rus', and other predecessor states of Russia.

Regardless of ethnicity or emigration, the list includes famous natives of Russia and its predecessor states, as well as people who were born elsewhere but spent most of their active life in Russia. For more information, see the articles Russian citizens (Russian: россияне, romanized: rossiyane), Russians (Russian: русские, romanized: russkiye) and Demographics of Russia. For specific lists of Russians, see Category:Lists of Russian people and Category:Russian people.

== Statesmen ==
=== Monarchs ===
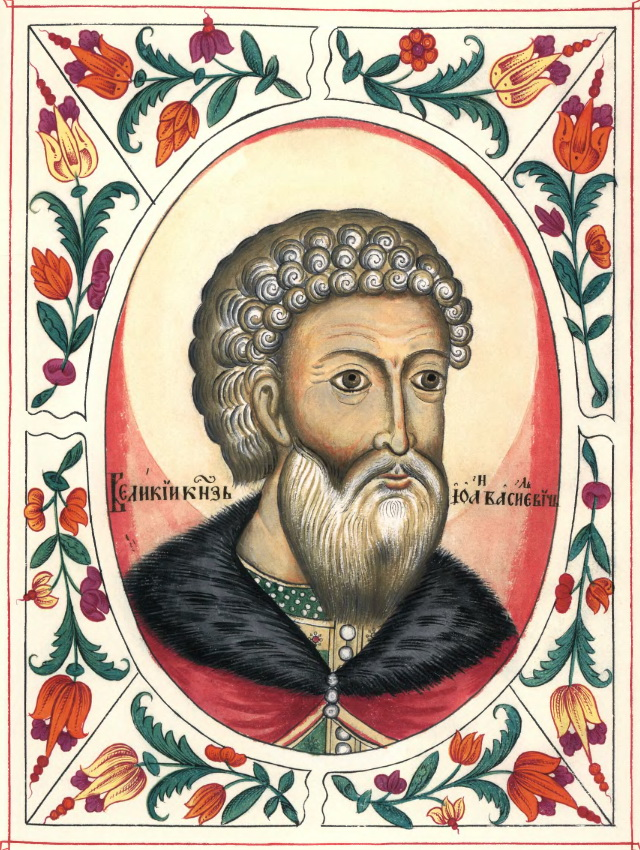
Ivan the Great

- Rurik, ruler of Novgorod, progenitor of the Rurikid Dynasty, traditionally the first ruler of Russia
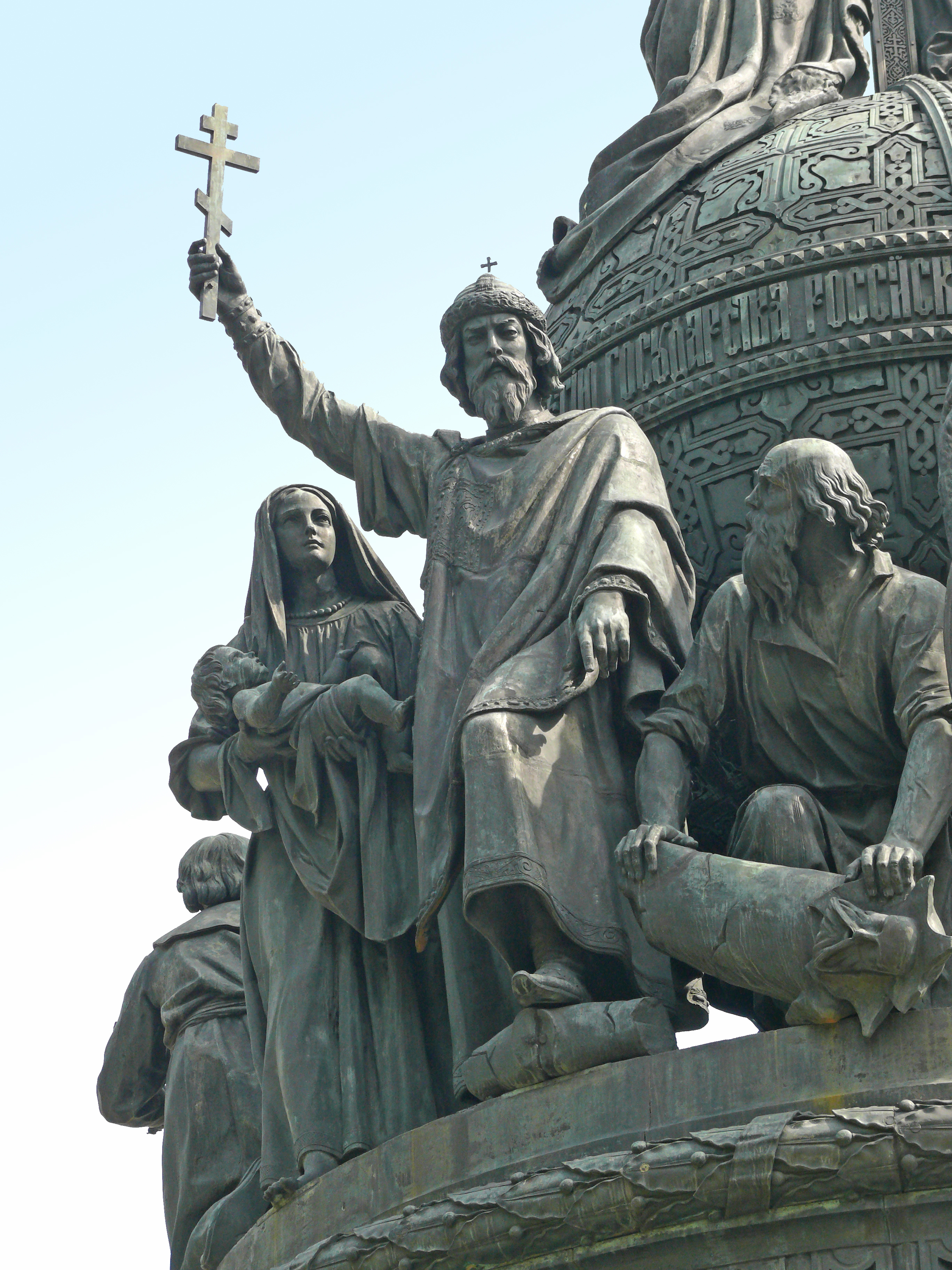
  Vladimir the Great
- Oleg "the Seer", conqueror of Kiev and founder of Kievan Rus', famous for his wars with the Byzantium
- Igor "the Old", first historically well-attested Rurikid ruler
- Olga, first female ruler of Rus' (regent), the first Christian among Russian rulers
- Vladimir I "the Great", turned saint from pagan and enacted the Christianization of Kievan Rus'
- Yaroslav I "the Wise", reigned in the period when Kievan Rus' reached the zenith of its cultural flowering and military power, founder of Yaroslavl
- Vladimir II Monomakh, defender of Rus' from Cuman nomads, presided over the end of the Golden Age of Kiev
- Yury I "the Long-Handed", founder of Moscow
- Andrey I, "Bogolyubsky" (the God-Loving), key figure in transition of political power from Kiev to Vladimir-Suzdal

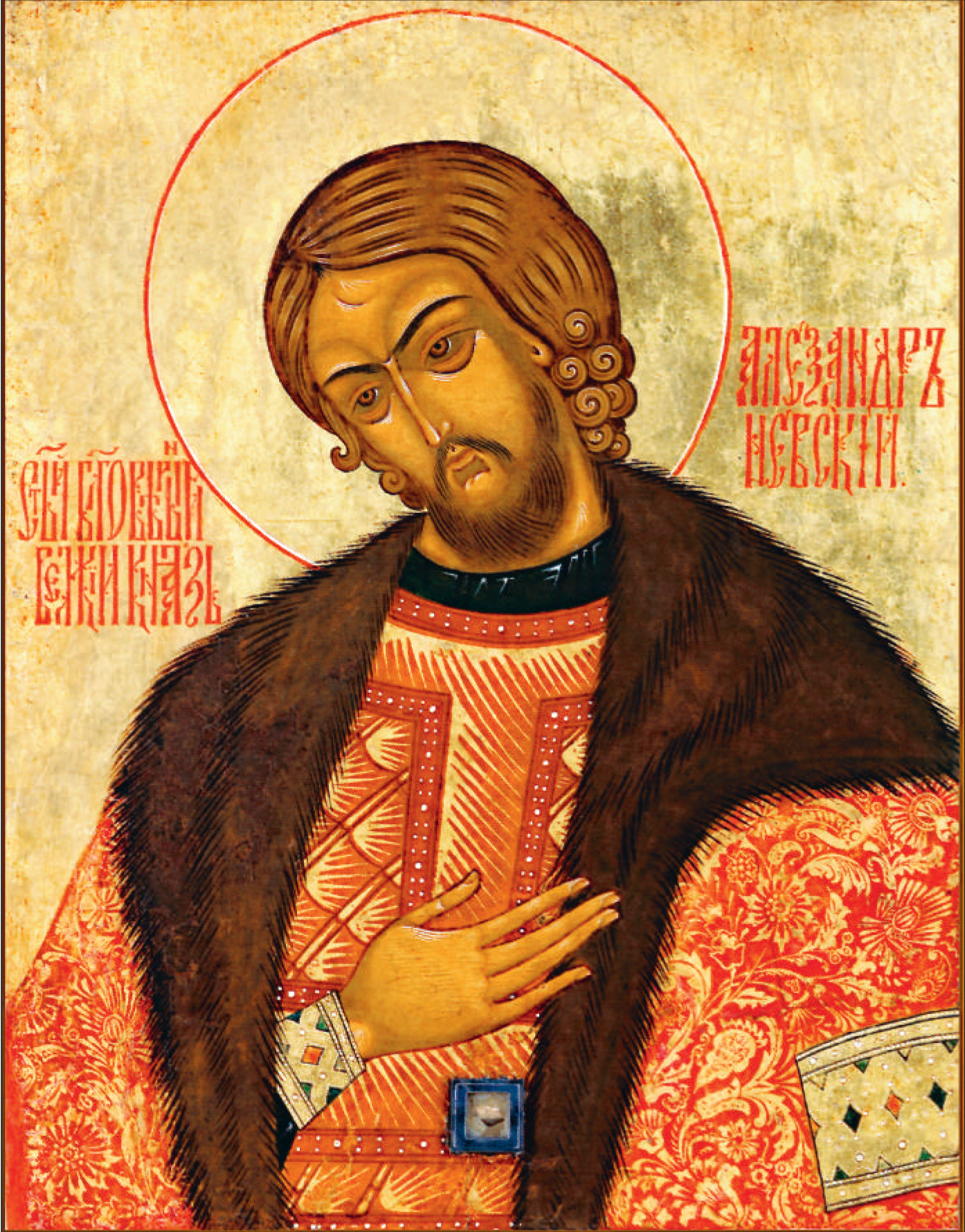
Alexander Nevsky

- Vsevolod "the Big Nest", the Grand Prince of Vladimir during its Golden Age, had 14 children
- Alexander Nevsky, Prince of Novgorod and Grand Prince of Vladimir, military hero famous for the Battle of Neva and the Battle of the Ice, patron saint and the Name of Russia
- Ivan I "the Moneybag", brought wealth and power to Moscow by maintaining his loyalty to the Golden Horde and acting as its chief tax collector in Russia
- Simeon "the Proud", continued the policies of his father Ivan I, died of the Black Death
- Dmitry Donskoy, saint and war hero, the first Prince of Moscow to openly challenge Mongol authority in Russia, famous for the Battle of Kulikovo
- Ivan III "the Great", reunited the Central and Northern Rus', put an end to the Mongol yoke, brought Renaissance architecture to Russia
- Ivan IV, the first Tsar of Russia, called "the Terrible" in the West; transformed Russia into a multiethnic, multiconfessional, and transcontinental state
- Boris Godunov, the first non-Rurikid monarch
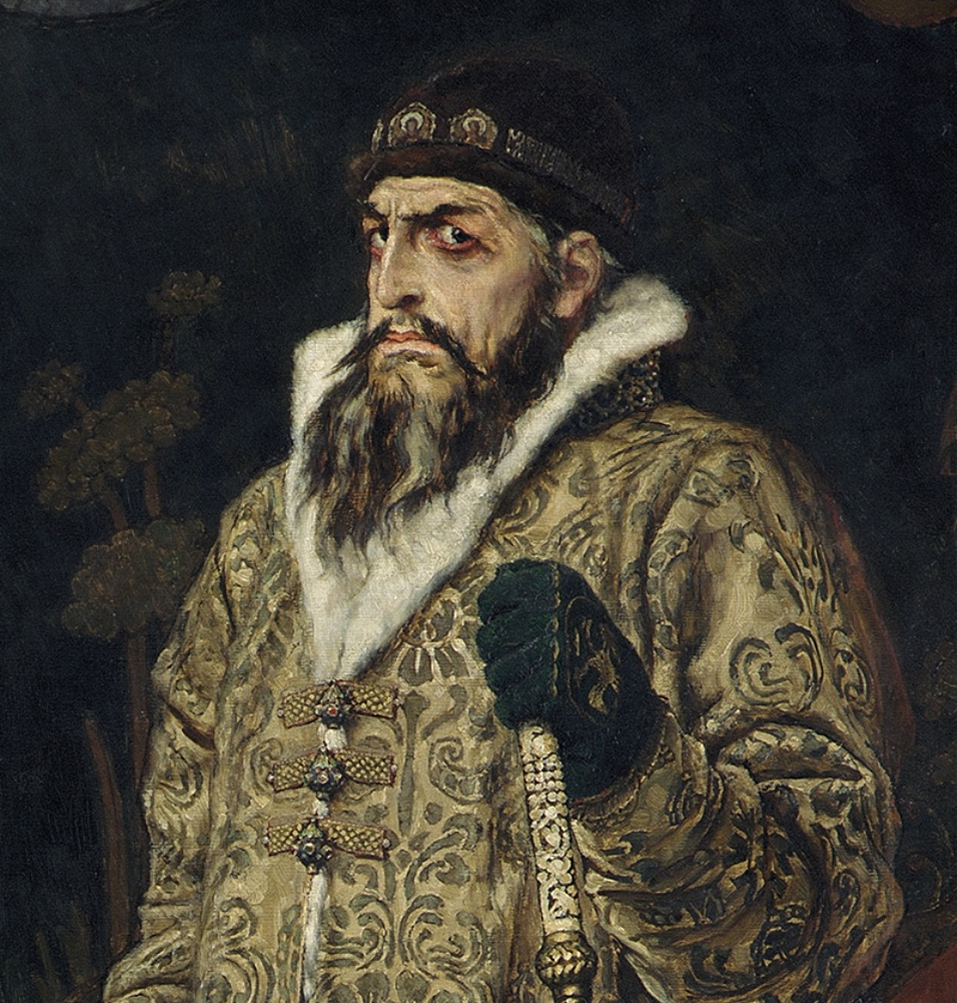
  Ivan the Terrible
- False Dmitriy I, the first impostor during the Time of Troubles
- Vasili IV Shuisky, Tsar elected during the Time of Troubles
- False Dmitry II, the second impostor during the Time of Troubles
- Mikhail, first Romanov monarch, oversaw the largest ever expansion of Russia's territory, reaching the Pacific

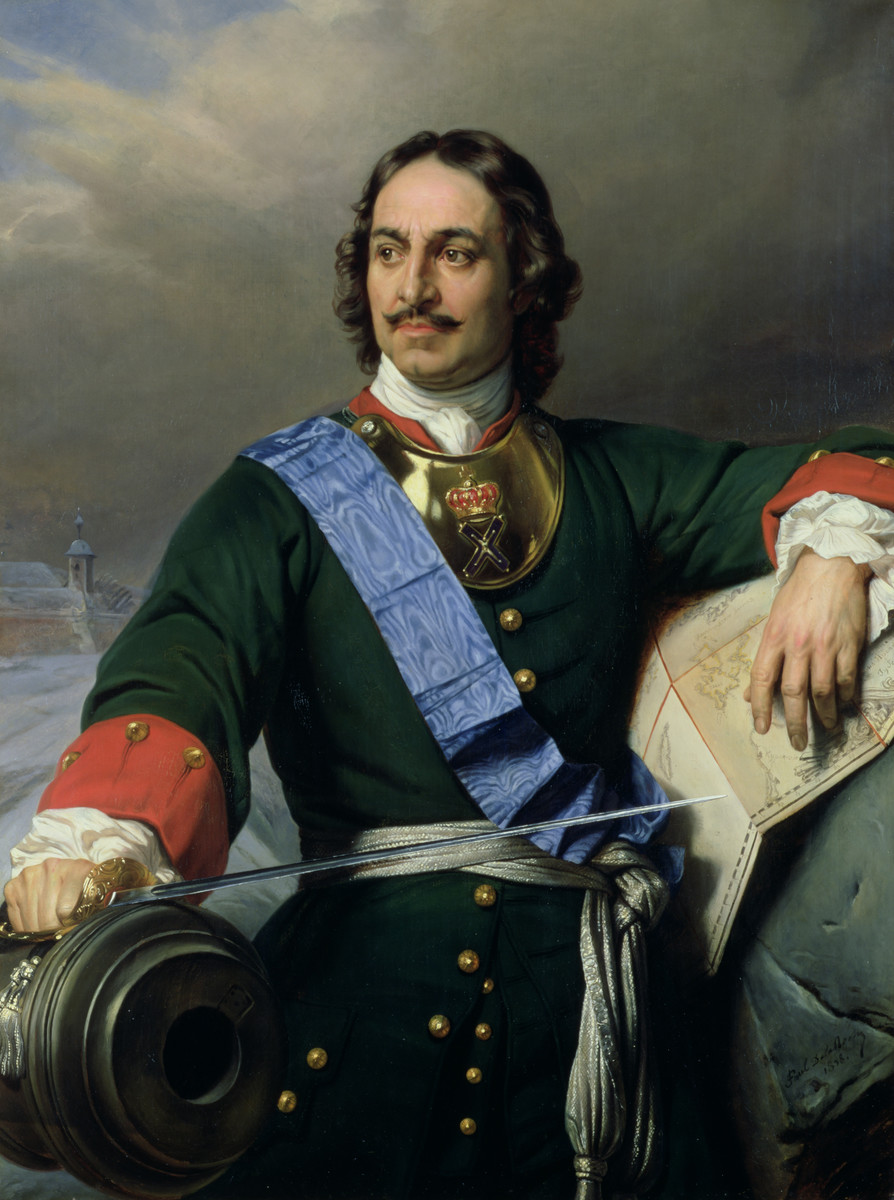
Peter the Great

- Peter I "the Great", first Russian emperor, polymath craftsman and inventor, modernized Russian Army and westernized culture, won the Great Northern War, founded the Russian Navy and the new capital Saint Petersburg
- Catherine I, first Russian empress
- Elizabeth, "the Merry Empress" during the era of high Baroque
- Catherine II "the Great", German-born Russian Empress during the Age of Enlightenment, significantly expanded Russia's territory

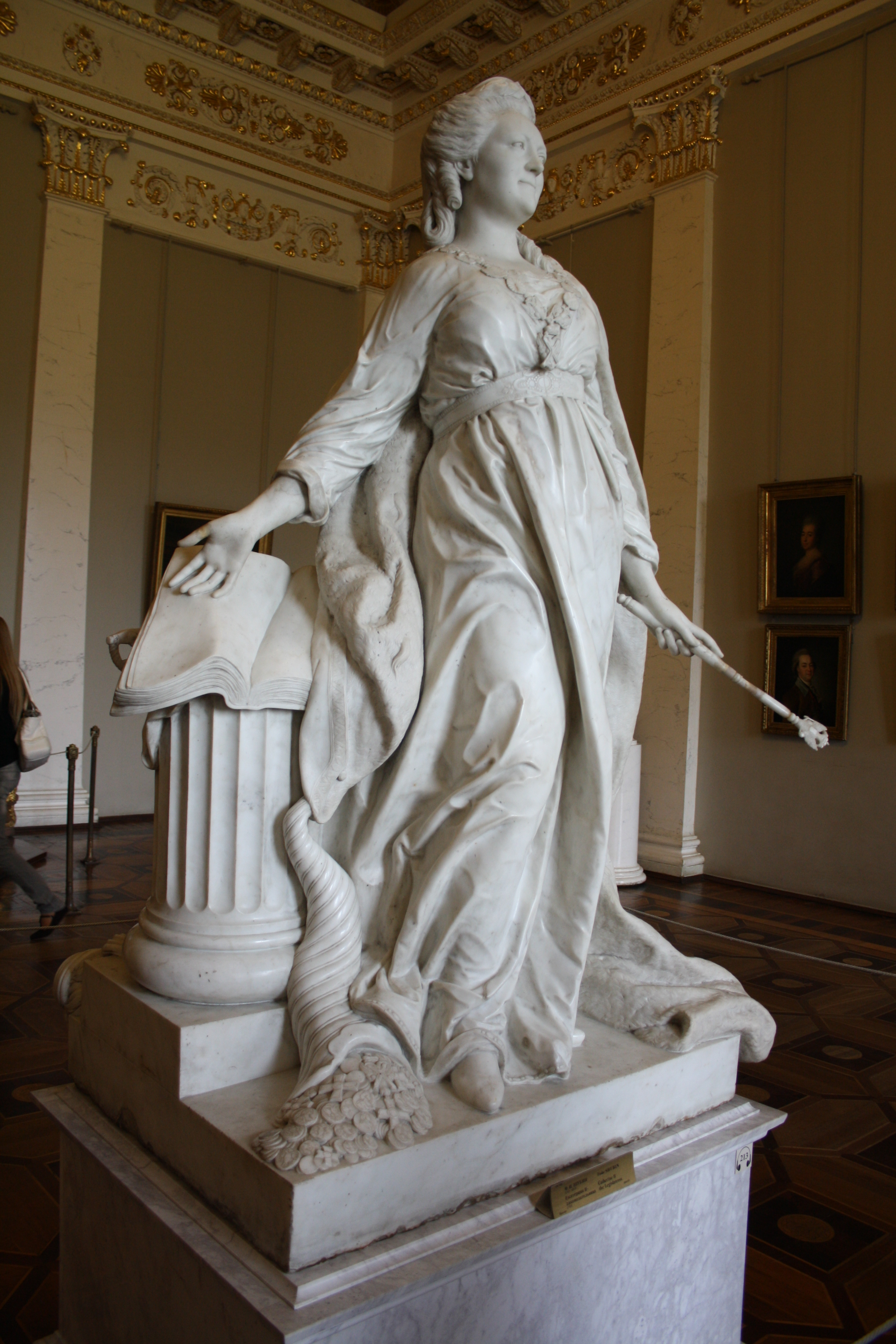
Catherine the Great

- Alexander I, first Russian king of Poland and first Russian grand duke of Finland
- Alexander II "the Liberator", enacted the "Great Reforms" in Russian economy and social structure, including the emancipation reform of 1861
- Alexander III "the Peacemaker", reversed some of the liberal reforms of his father, Alexander II; this policy is known in Russia as "counter-reforms"; he also opposed any reform that limited his autocratic rule; during his reign, Russia fought no major wars
- Nicholas II, the last actual emperor, forced to abdicate after the February Revolution, killed with his family during the Russian Civil War

=== Statesmen of the Tsardom and Empire ===
- Aleksey Arakcheyev, Minister of War of Alexander I, organized military-agricultural colonies
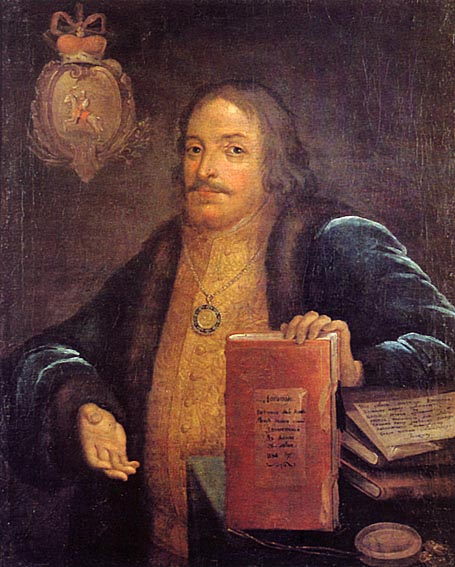
  Vasily Golitsyn
- Abram Gannibal, general and military engineer of Black African origin, governor of Reval, the great-grandfather of Alexander Pushkin and hero of his novel The Moor of Peter the Great
- Vasily Golitsyn, 17th-century commander of the Russian Army, Foreign Minister and a favourite of Tsarevna Sophia, abolished rank priority in the military, concluded Eternal Peace Treaty of 1686 with Poland, one of the most educated Russians of the time
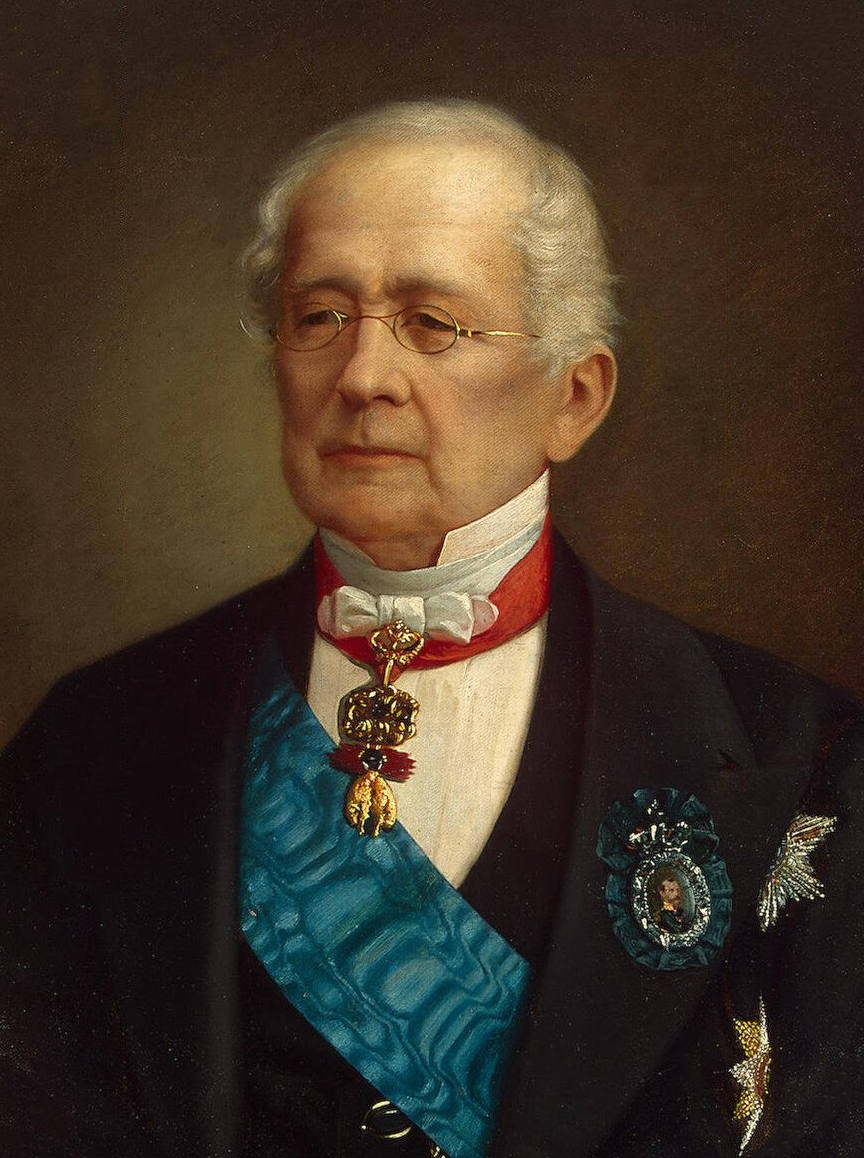
  Alexander Gorchakov
- Fyodor Golovin, associate of Peter the Great, general admiral, the first Russian field marshal and Chancellor, the first Russian count and the first to receive the Order of St. Andrew, negotiated the Treaty of Nerchinsk and the Treaty of Karlowitz
- Alexander Gorchakov, Foreign Minister and Chancellor of Alexander II, a friend and rival of Otto von Bismarck, denounced the Treaty of Paris (1856), advocated the League of the Three Emperors
- Ivan Goremykin, twice the Prime Minister of Imperial Russia

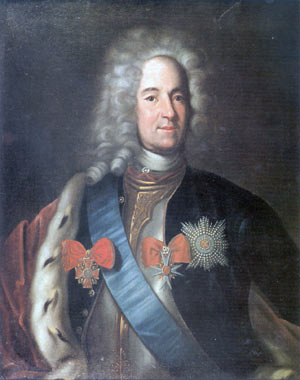
Aleksandr Menshikov

- Alexander Kerensky, second and the last Prime Minister of the Russian Provisional Government
- Franz Lefort, tutor of Peter the Great, general and diplomat, oversaw the foundation of the Russian Navy
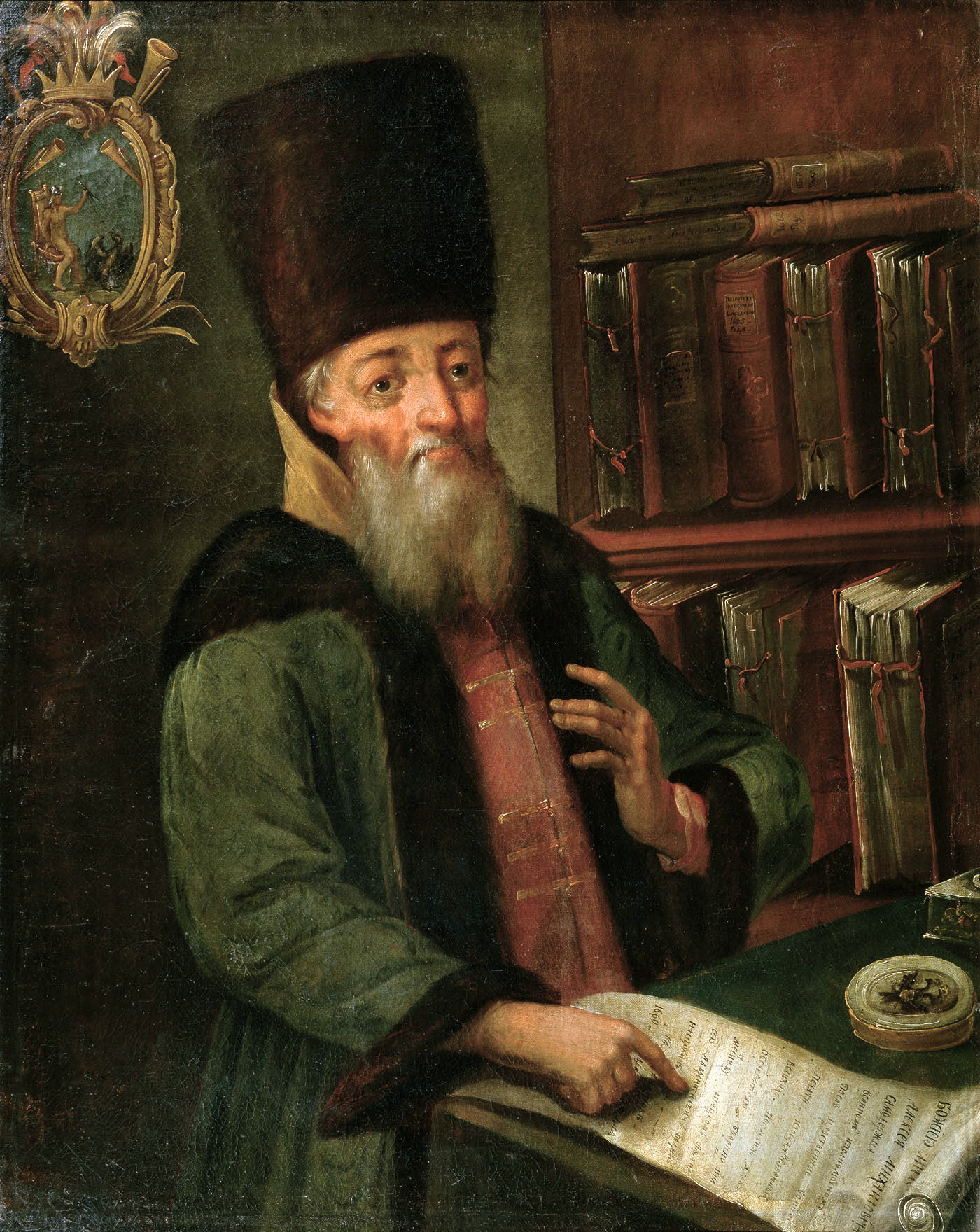
  Afanasy Ordin-Nashchokin
- Georgy Lvov, first Prime Minister of the Russian Provisional Government
- Aleksandr Menshikov, associate and friend of Peter the Great, de facto ruler of Russia for two years after Peter's death, generalissimus, Prince, the first Governor of Saint Petersburg
- Pavel Milyukov, founder of the Constitutional Democratic Party, Foreign Minister in the Russian Provisional Government
- Nikolay Muravyov-Amursky, governor of the East Siberia, coloniser of the Priamurye and Primorye, concluded the Treaty of Aigun and the Treaty of Beijing (1860) with China
- Karl Nesselrode, Foreign Minister of Alexander II and Nicholas I, a leading European conservative statesman of the Holy Alliance
- Grigory Orlov, favourite of Catherine the Great who enthroned her, progenitor of Bobrinsky family, founder of the Free Economic Society, owner of the Orlov Diamond
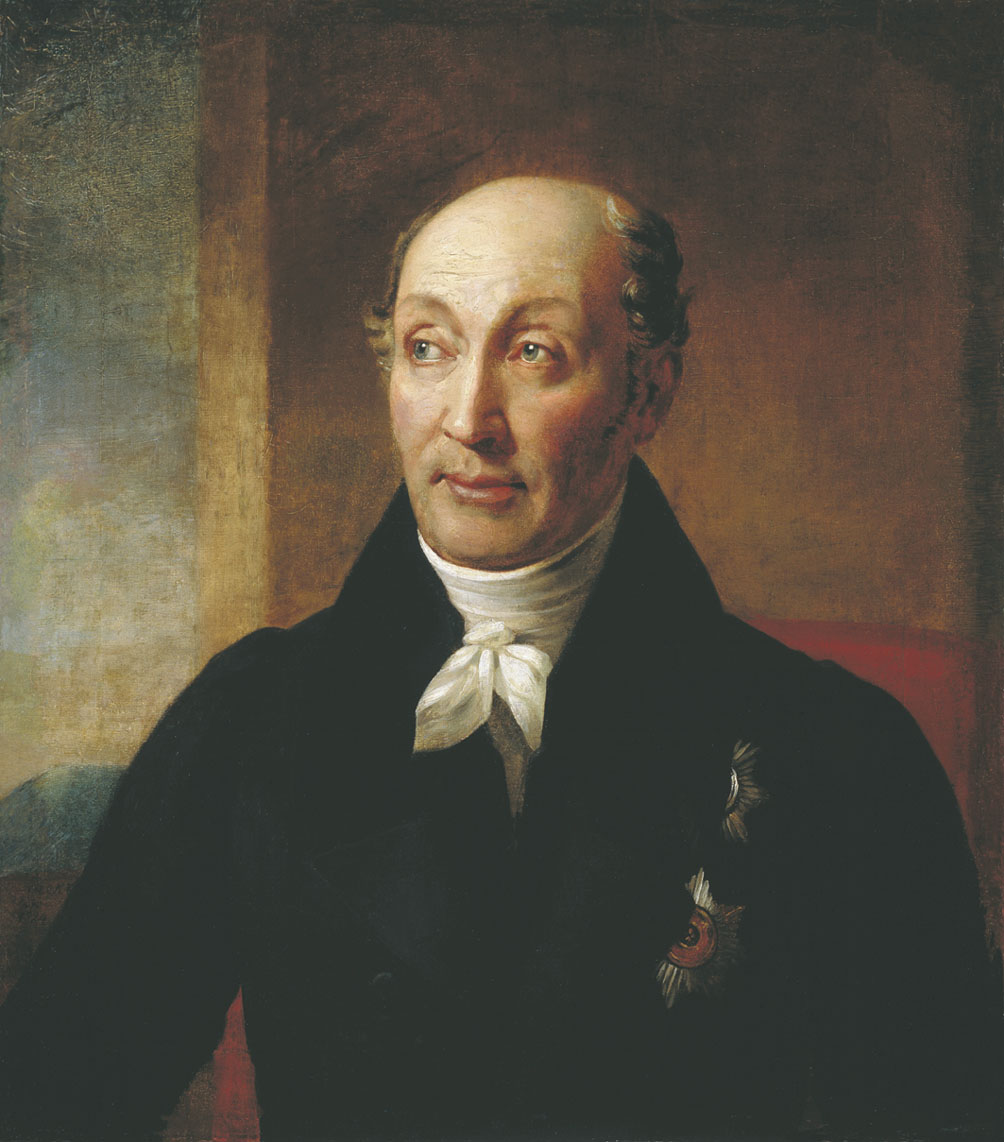
  Mikhail Speransky
- Konstantin Pobedonostsev, tutor to Alexander III and Éminence grise of his imperial politics
- Grigory Potyomkin-Tavrichesky, favourite of Catherine II, conqueror and the first governor of Novorossiya, founder of Sevastopol and Yekaterinoslav
- Grigori Rasputin, mystic and healer who influenced the latter politics of Nicholas II
- Kirill Razumovsky, last Hetman of Ukrainian Cossacks, the president of the Russian Academy of Sciences
- Nikolay Rumyantsev, Foreign Minister during the French invasion of Russia, founder of the Rumyantsev Museum
- Ivan Serebrennikov, Chairman of the Council of Ministers of the Russian state
- Mikhail Speransky, chief reformer during the reign of Alexander I, father of Russian liberalism, oversaw the publication of the Full Collection of Laws of the Russian Empire
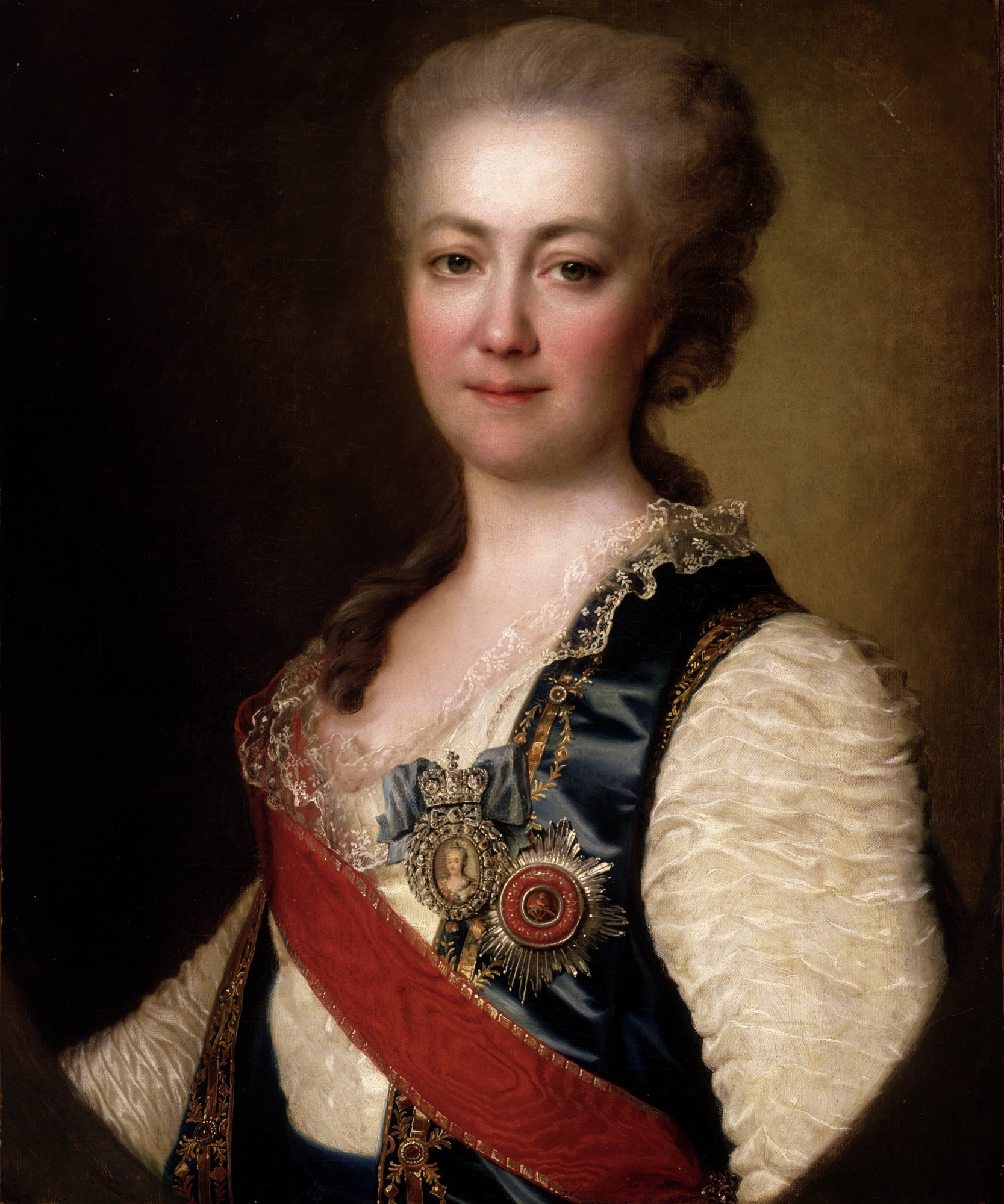
  Ekaterina Vorontsova-Dashkova
- Pyotr Stolypin, Interior Minister and then Prime Minister, put down the Russian Revolution of 1905, initiated Stolypin reform
- Pyotr Vologodsky, Minister of Supply of the Russian state
- Ekaterina Vorontsova-Dashkova, closest female friend of Catherine the Great, a major figure of the Russian Enlightenment, a director of the Imperial Academy of Arts and Sciences and the founder of Russian Academy
- Sergei Witte, Finance Minister who later became the first Prime Minister of Russia, presided over extensive industrialization of the country, and supervised the construction of the Trans-Siberian Railway

=== Soviet statesmen ===
- Nikolai Bukharin, leading Bolshevik revolutionary, Marxist theoretician, economist and prolific author, Politburo member in the 1920s, editor of government newspapers Pravda and Izvestia, author of The ABC of Communism
- Nikolai Bulganin, leading Communist politician, served as the Minister of Defense and the Premier of the Soviet Union, backed de-Stalinization
- Mikhail Gorbachev last General Secretary of the CPSU and the only President of the Soviet Union, launched the policies of glasnost and perestroika, presided over the dissolution of the Soviet Union
- Mikhail Kalinin, Old Bolshevik politician and the Head of state of the Soviet Union in 1938–1946
- Nikita Khrushchev, leader of the Soviet Union in 1953–1964, launched de-Stalinisation and many erratic policies, backed the progress of the early Soviet space program
- Alexei Kosygin, Soviet Premier under Brezhnev, author of the eventually stifled Kosygin reform which included elements of capitalist management
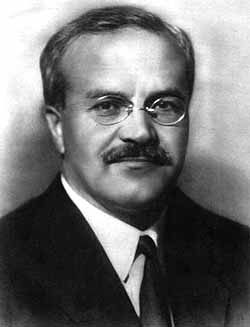
  Vyacheslav Molotov
- Vladimir Lenin, founder of Bolshevik party, the leader of the October Revolution, the first Soviet head of state in 1917–1922, founder of the Soviet Union, creator of Leninism
- Anatoly Lunacharsky, first Soviet Minister of Enlightenment
- Georgy Malenkov, close associate of Stalin, Soviet Premier and one of the leaders after Stalin's death
- Vyacheslav Molotov Soviet Premier in the 1930s, Foreign Minister during World War II, a close associate of Stalin
- Yakov Sverdlov, first de jure head of the Russian SFSR
- Mikhail Suslov, leading ideologist during the Brezhnev era
- Gennady Yanayev, leader of the August Coup that attempted to depose Gorbachev
- Nikolai Yezhov, Interior Minister and head of the NKVD during the period of the Great Purge, was executed soon after

=== Contemporary Russian politicians ===
- Viktor Chernomyrdin, leading politician and businessman, served as the first Chairman of Gazprom and the Premier of Russia
- Yegor Gaidar, leading politician and economist, served as the Premier of Russia, launched the controversial shock therapy reforms aimed at creating a liberal free market economy in Russia
- Boris Gryzlov, leading politician, parliamentarian and diplomat, served as the Minister of Internal Affairs of Russia and the Chairman of the State Duma, currently serves as the Russian Ambassador to Belarus
- Mikhail Fradkov, leading politician, intelligence official and scholar, served as Premier of Russia and the Director of the Foreign Intelligence Service, currently heads the Russian Institute for Strategic Studies
- Sergei Kiriyenko, leading politician and apparatchik, served as the Premier of Russia and the General Director of Rosatom, currently serves as the First Deputy Chief of Staff of the Presidential Administration of Russia

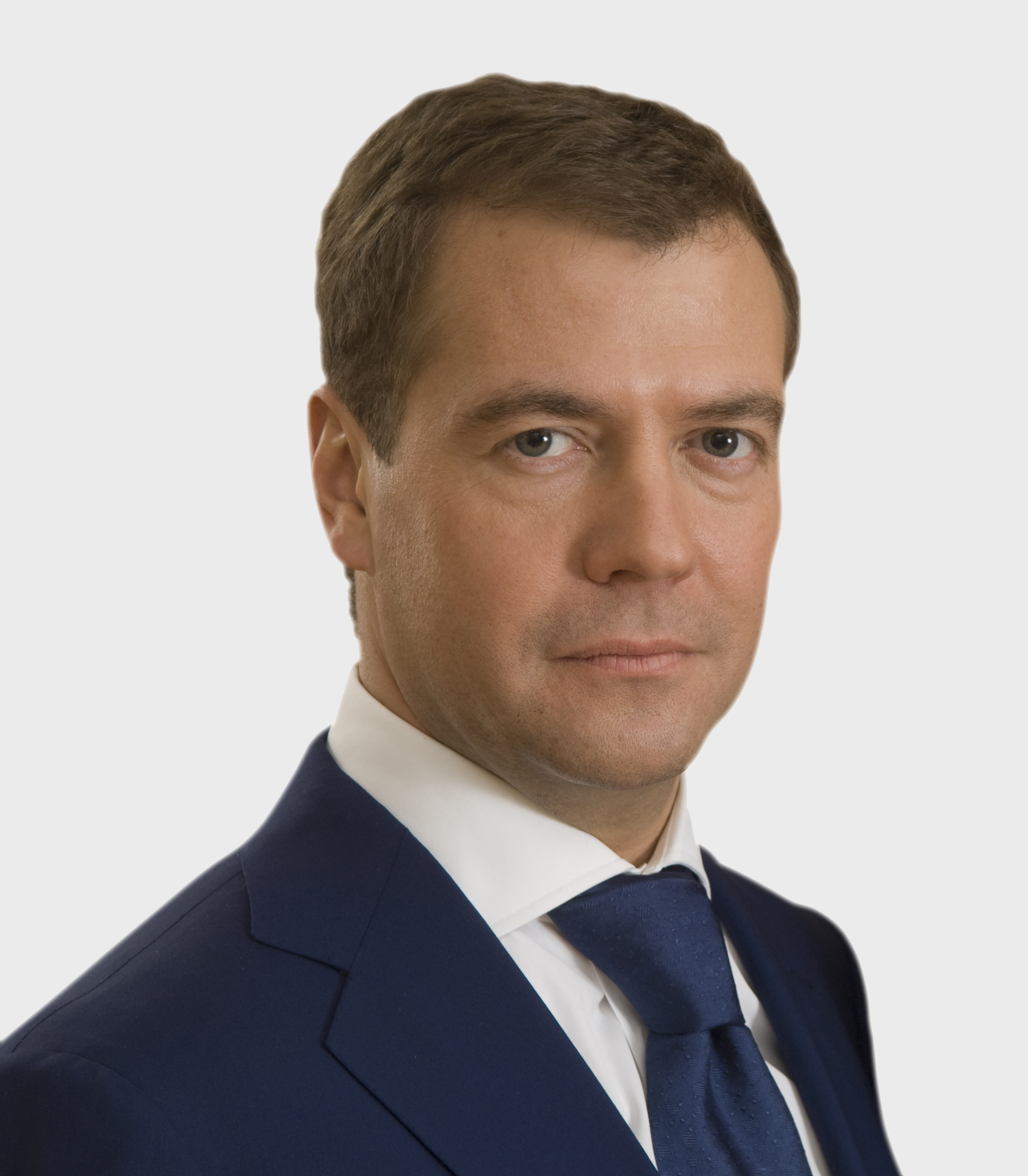
Dmitry Medvedev

- Sergey Lavrov, leading politician and diplomat, served as the Russian Ambassador to the United Nations, currently the Minister of Foreign Affairs of Russia
- Yury Luzhkov, leading politician, served as the Mayor of Moscow, was one of the founders of the ruling United Russia party
- Evgeny Markin, businessman, public figure and politician
- Valentina Matviyenko, leading politician, parliamentarian and diplomat, served as the Russian Ambassador to Malta and Greece as well as the Governor of Saint Petersburg, currently the Chairman of the Federation Council
- Dmitry Medvedev, leading politician and security official, served as the President and the Premier of Russia, currently the Deputy Chairman of the Security Council of Russia
- Sergei Mironov, leading politician and parliamentarian, served as Chairman of the Federation Council, founder and current Chairman of the A Just Russia — For Truth party
- Yevgeny Primakov, leading politician, diplomat, intelligence officer and academician, served as the Director of the Foreign Intelligence Service, the Minister of Foreign Affairs and the Premier of Russia, presided over the start of Russian economic recovery and a significant change in foreign policy
- Vladimir Putin, leading politician and intelligence officer, served as the Director of the Federal Security Service and the Premier of Russia, currently the President of Russia, presided over impressive Russian economic recovery and military build-up, annexed Crimea

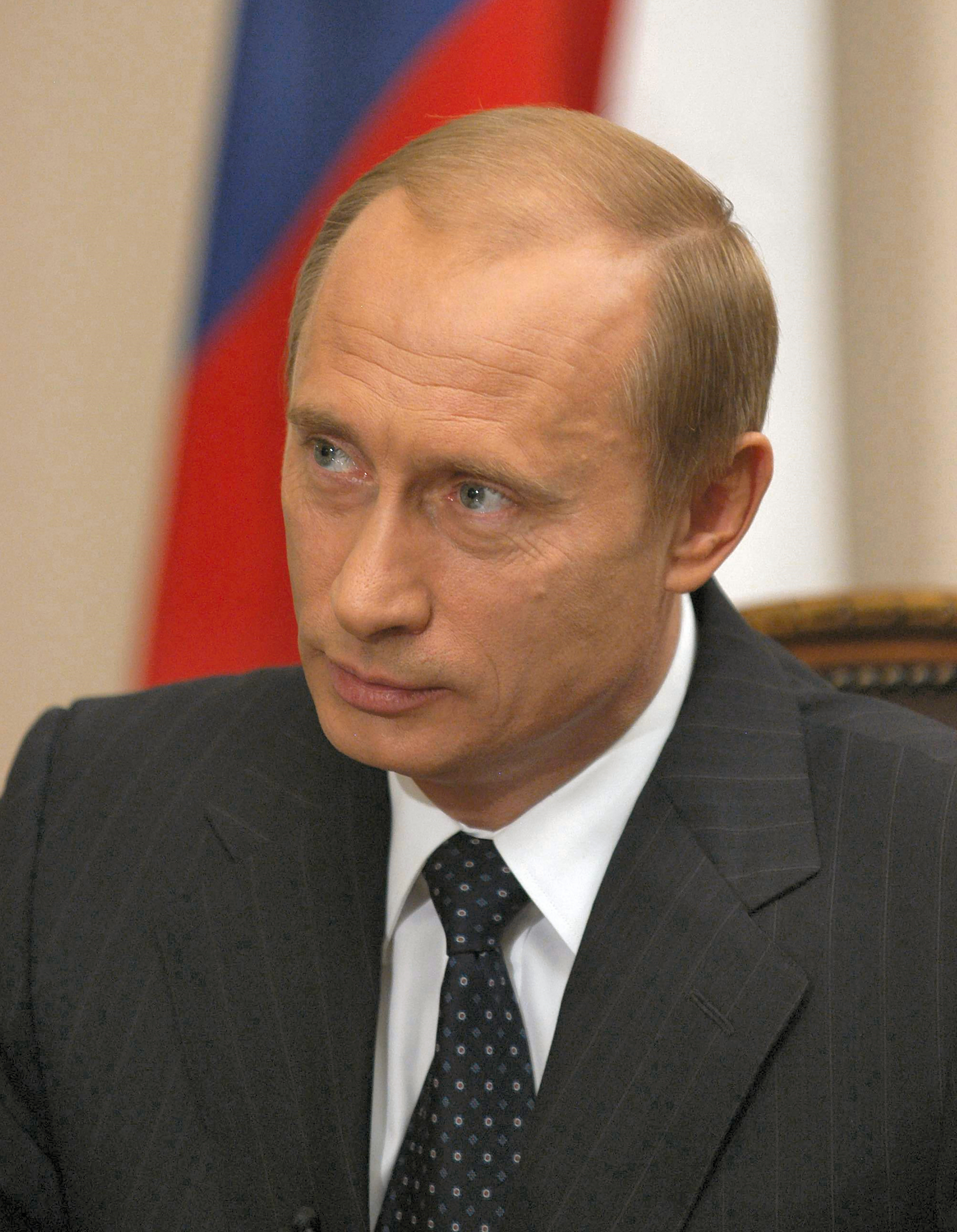
Vladimir Putin

- Anatoly Sobchak, first post-Soviet mayor of St. Petersburg
- Sergei Stepashin, Prime Minister in 1999, currently the head of the Account Chamber of Russia (the state audit agency)
- Boris Yeltsin, the first President of Russia from 1991 to 1999

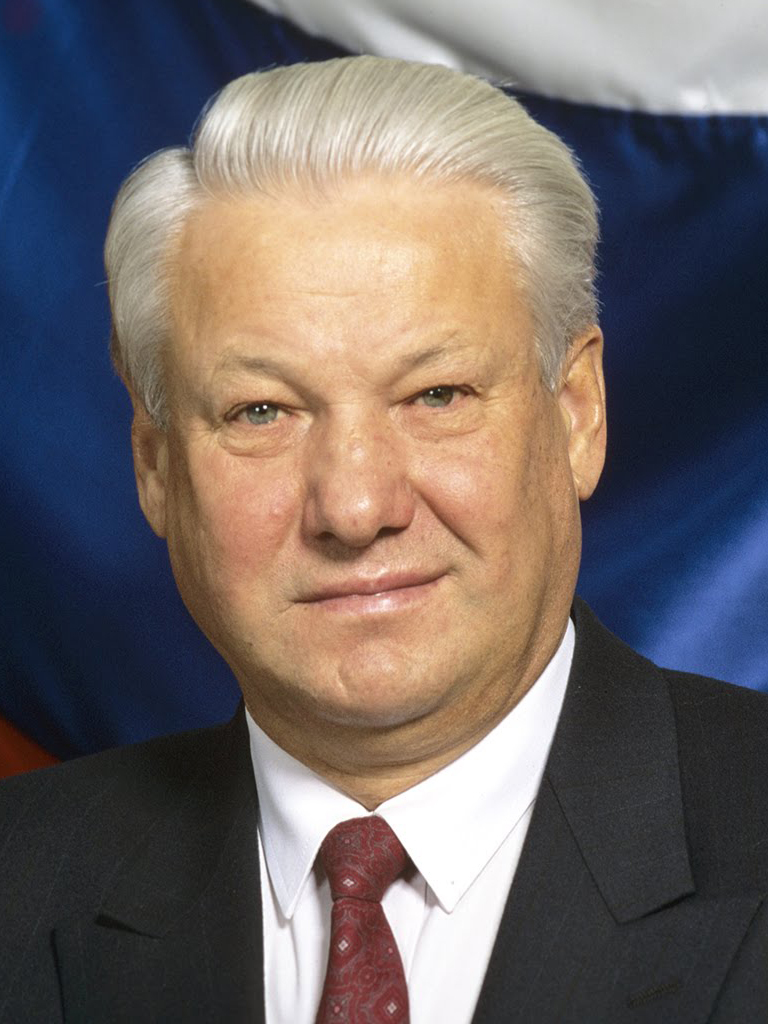
Boris Yeltsin

- Vladimir Zhirinovsky, founder and the leader of the Liberal Democratic Party of Russia, Vice-chairman of the State Duma
- Gennady Zyuganov, head of the Communist Party of the Russian Federation since 1993

== Military ==
=== Army ===
- Mikhail Annenkov, conqueror of Central Asia and builder of the strategical Transcaspian Railway

Vasily Chapaev

- Ivan Bagramyan, Soviet marshal, prominent in the Baltic Offensive and Operation Bagration during World War II
- Pyotr Bagration, general and hero of the Napoleonic Wars, mortally wounded in the Battle of Borodino
- Roman Bagration, general and brother of Pyotr Bagration, participated in the Napoleonic Wars
- Aleksandr Baryatinsky, field marshal, perfected the mountain warfare tactics of the Russian Army, captured Imam Shamil during the Caucasian War
- Alexander Bekovich-Cherkassky, leader of the first Russian military expeditions into Central Asia, founder of Krasnovodsk
- Vasily Blücher, one of the first five Soviet marshals, prominent in the Russian Civil War and the Northern Expedition in China
- Maria Bochkareva, founder of the Women's Battalion of Death during World War I
- Aleksei Brusilov, World War I general, led the tactically innovative Brusilov Offensive, destroying the military of Austria-Hungary almost completely
  Denis Davydov
- Semyon Budyonny, Civil War commander, statesman, triple Hero of the Soviet Union
- Vasily Chapayev, legendary Civil War commander, prototype for Chapaev movie and Chapayev and Void novel, hero of many Russian jokes
- Mikhail Chernyayev, general, captured Tashkent during the conquest of Central Asia, the governor of Russian Turkestan
- Vasily Chuikov, commander and hero in the Battle of Stalingrad, Soviet marshal, double HSU
- Denis Davydov, general, guerilla fighter and soldier-poet of the Napoleonic Wars, invented a genre of hussar poetry noted for its hedonism and bravado
- Anton Denikin, Civil War general, one of the leaders of White Movement
- Hans Karl von Diebitsch-Zabalkansky, able field marshal, took Adrianople during the Russo-Turkish War (1828–1829)
- Mikhail Petrovich Dolgorukov (1780–1808), Russian major-general who was killed in the Battle of Virta Bro against the Swedes
- Nadezhda Durova, "the Cavalry Maiden", a female hero of the Napoleonic wars
- Alexander Gorbatyi-Shuisky, voevoda of Tsar Ivan IV, hero of the Russo-Kazan Wars and the final Siege of Kazan (1552)

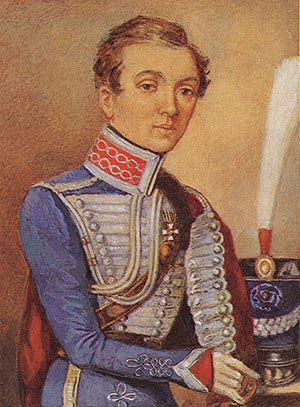
Nadezhda Durova

- Leonid Govorov, World War II Soviet marshal, led Operation Spark (1943) which broke the blockade of Leningrad
- Andrei Grechko, World War II Soviet marshal, Soviet Defence Minister under Brezhnev
- Ivan Gudovich, field marshal, conquered Khadjibey and Anapa in the Russo-Turkish War (1787–1792), conquered Dagestan in the Russo-Turkish War (1806–1812)
- Iosif Gurko, commander and hero of the Russo-Turkish War (1877–1878), won the battles of Shipka Pass, Gorni Dubnik and Plovdiv, liberated the Bulgarian capital Sofia
- Mikhail Frunze, revolutionary, a prominent Civil War commander
- Nikolay Kamensky, victor over the Swedes at Salmi, Oravais, and Sävar, victor over the Turks at Batin
- Konstantin Kaufmann, conqueror of the Khanate of Khiva, the first governor of Russian Turkestan
- Ivan Konev, Soviet marshal, led Red Army on the Eastern Front,

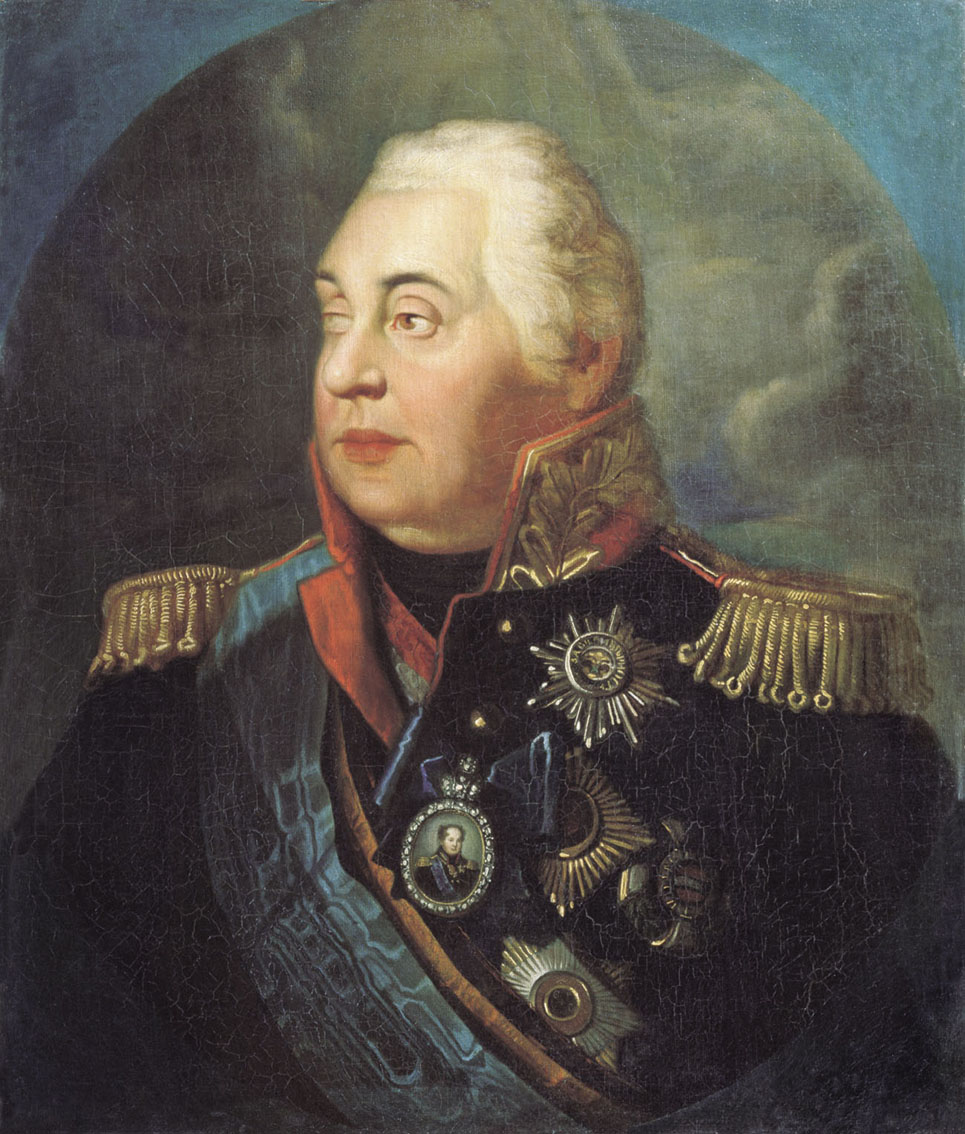
Mikhail Golenishchev-Kutuzov-Smolensky double HSU

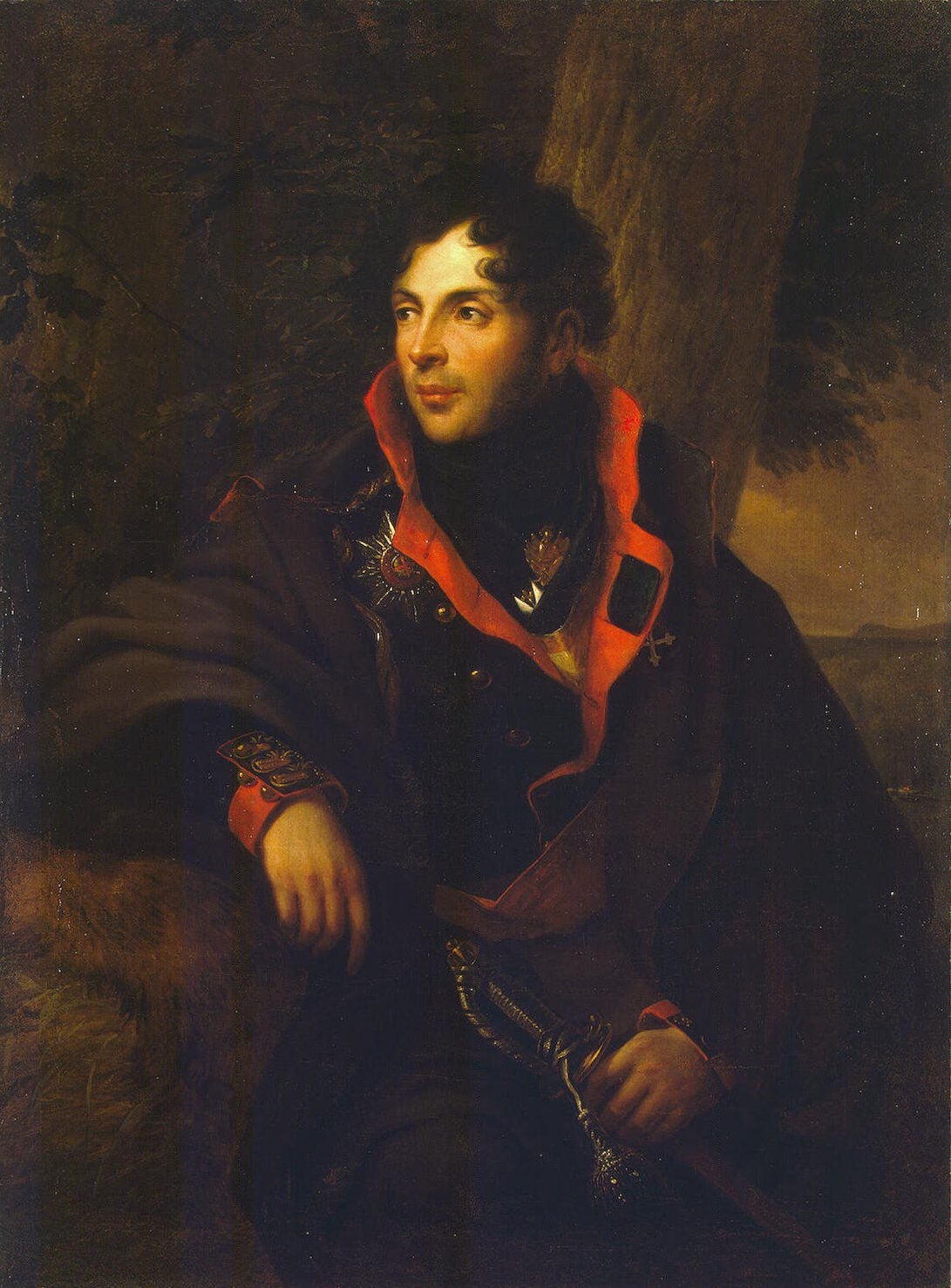
Nikolay Kamensky

- Lavr Kornilov, World War I general, notable for Kornilov Affair
- Nikolay Krylov, Soviet marshal, commander of the Strategic Rocket Forces under Brezhnev, double HSU
- Mikhail Kutuzov, hero of the Russo-Turkish War (1787–1792), defeated Napoleon's Grande Armée during French invasion of Russia in 1812, turning the tide of the Napoleonic Wars
- Andrey Kurbsky, associate and then a leading political opponent of Tsar Ivan IV, hero of the Russo-Kazan Wars
- Peter Lacy, field marshal, led the Siege of Danzig (1734), commander-in-chief during Russo-Swedish War (1741–1743)
- Rodion Malinovsky, Soviet marshal, prominent at the Battle of Stalingrad and the Battle of Budapest, Soviet Defense Minister under Khrushchev
- Alexander Matrosov, World War II soldier, self-sacrificed himself to win the battle, Hero of the Soviet Union
- Aleksandr Menshikov, associate of Peter the Great, field marshal in the Great Northern War, won the principal Battle of Poltava
- Kirill Meretskov, Soviet marshal, led the Petsamo–Kirkenes Offensive which liberated the northern Norway from Nazi occupation, prominent in the Soviet invasion of Manchuria
- Mikhail Miloradovich, hero of the Napoleonic Wars, killed in attempt to pacify the Decembrist revolt
- Kuzma Minin, national hero, merchant who led Russia's struggle for independence against Poland-Lithuania during the Time of Troubles
- Burkhard Christoph von Münnich, field marshal, statesman, founder of the first Cadet Corps in Russia, led the Siege of Danzig (1734), commander-in-chief during Russo-Austrian-Turkish War (1735–1739)
- Semyon Andreevich Pugachov, captain in World War one, commanded several fronts across the USSR.
- Rodion Oslyabya, monk from Trinity Sergius Lavra, hero of the Battle of Kulikovo
- Fabian Gottlieb von Osten-Sacken, conquered the Duchy of Warsaw and governed Paris during the War of the Sixth Coalition
- Ivan Panfilov, World War II general, hero of the Battle of Moscow, the commander of Panfilovtsy, HSU
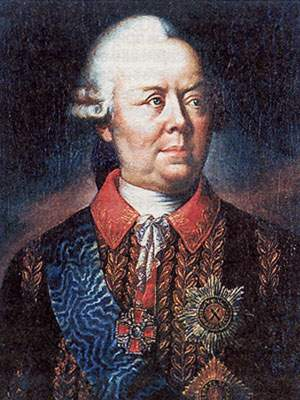
  Pyotr Rumyantsev-Zadunaysky
- Ivan Paskevich, hero and commander in the Russo-Persian War (1826–1828) and the Russo-Turkish War (1828–1829), crushed the Polish November Uprising and the Hungarian Revolution of 1848
- Lyudmila Pavlichenko, World War II Soviet sniper, credited with 309 kills, the most successful female sniper in history
- Alexander Peresvet, monk from Trinity Sergius Lavra, hero of the Battle of Kulikovo, fought with the Tatar champion Chelubey in single combat where they killed each other
- Grigory Potyomkin-Tavrichesky, conqueror and coloniser of Novorossiya, reformer of the Russian Army, led the Siege of Ochakov (1788) during the Russo-Turkish War (1787–1792)
- Dmitry Pozharsky, national hero, prince who led Russia's struggle for independence against Poland-Lithuania during the Time of Troubles
- Alexander Prozorovsky, commander-in-chief during the Russo-Turkish War (1806–1812)
- Nikolay Raevsky, hero of the Napoleonic Wars and the Battle of Borodino
- Anikita Repnin, field marshal in the Great Northern War, conqueror and the first governor of Riga
- Nicholas Repnin, field marshal and diplomat, hero of the Russo-Turkish wars, key man in the Partitions of Poland, pacified the Germans in the War of the Bavarian Succession
- Konstantin Rokossovsky, Soviet and Polish marshal, Defense Minister of Poland, double HSU, oversaw the main Soviet battle operations of the Eastern Front (World War II), commanded the Moscow Victory Parade of 1945
- Grigory Romodanovsky, leading Russian general of Tsar Alexey's reign, commander-in-chief during the Russo-Turkish War (1676–1681)
- Grand Duke Nicholas Nikolaevich, commander-in-chief of the Russian Army at the start of World War I, then commanded the Caucasus front
- Pyotr Rumyantsev-Zadunaysky, hero of the Seven Years' War, won the battles of Larga and Kagula and concluded the Russo-Turkish War of 1768–74 by the Treaty of Küçük Kaynarca, military writer

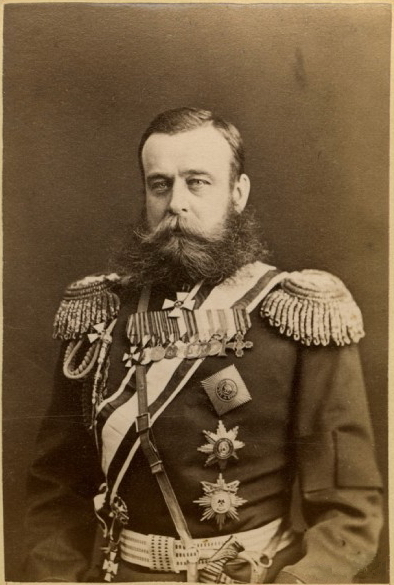
Mikhail Skobelev

- Pyotr Saltykov, most prominent Russian commander-in-chief during the Seven Years' War, won the battle of Paltzig and the battle of Kunersdorf; shortly after his Kunersdorf victory, Zakhar Chernyshev's Russians raided Berlin
- Igor Sergeyev, only marshal of the Russian Federation, Defense minister in the late 1990s
- Roza Shanina, World War II Soviet sniper, 54 confirmed kills
- Boris Shaposhnikov, Soviet marshal, chief of the general staff during the start of the German invasion, military theorist and author of The Brain of the Army
- Aleksei Shein, first Russian generalissimo, commander-in-chief during Azov campaigns
- Boris Sheremetev, field marshal in the Great Northern War, won the battle of Erastfer and the battle of Poltava
- Ivan Sidorenko, World War II Soviet sniper, over 500 confirmed kills
- Mikhail Skobelev, the "White General", conqueror of Central Asia and hero of the Russo-Turkish War of 1877-78
- Sergei Sokolov, Soviet marshal, chief commander during the Soviet–Afghan War
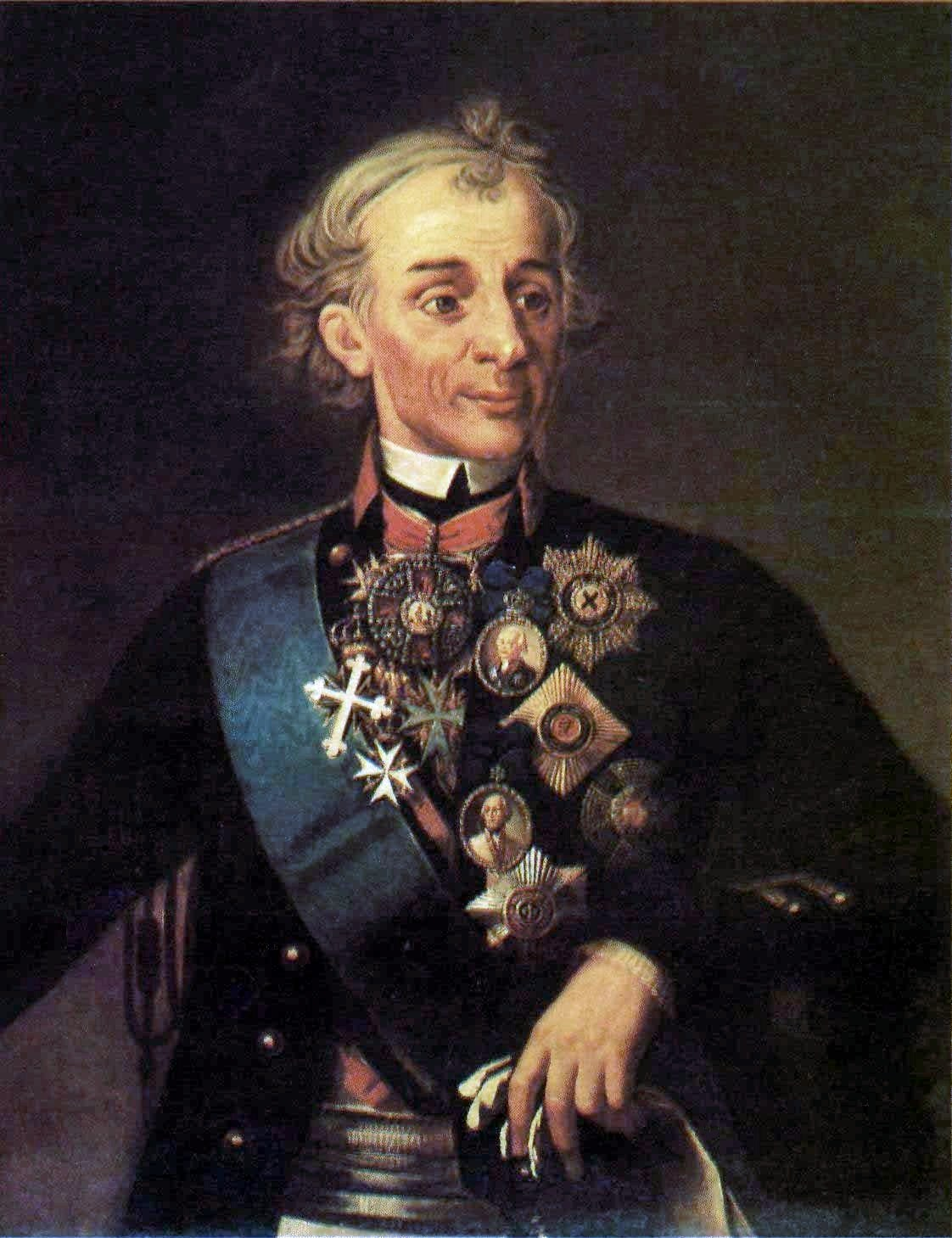
  Alexander Suvorov-Rymniksky
- Vasily Sokolovsky, Soviet marshal, prominent in the Battle of Moscow and the Battle of Kursk, military theorist
- Alexander Suvorov, greatest Russian general of the 18th century, generalissimo who never lost a battle, won at Kinburn, Focşani, the Rymnik, and Izmail during the Russo-Turkish War (1787–1792), crushed Kościuszko Uprising at Brest and Praga, led an outstanding Italian and Swiss expedition through the Adda, the Trebbia, and Novi, author of The Science of Victory (Russian: Наука побеждать)
- Semyon Timoshenko, World War II Soviet marshal, won the Winter War, senior professional officer of the Red Army at the start of the German invasion
- Fyodor Tolbukhin, World War II Soviet marshal, liberated Bulgaria and Yugoslavia
- Michael Barclay de Tolly, field marshal, led a strategic retreat during the French invasion of Russia, led Russian Army to Paris in the War of the Sixth Coalition
- Gennady Troshev, chief general during the Second Chechen War, Hero of Russia
- Mikhail Tukhachevsky, Red Army commander during the Russian Civil War, Soviet marshal, military theorist
- Dmitriy Ustinov, Soviet marshal, proponent of the Soviet space program, Defence Minister in the late Brezhnev era
- Aleksandr Vasilevsky, Soviet marshal, Chief of the Soviet General Staff during most of World War II, led the Soviet invasion of Manchuria, double HSU
- Vera Voloshina (1919–1941), heroic partisan in World War II
- Mikhail Vorontsov, field marshal, hero of the Napoleonic Wars, captured Varna in the Russo-Persian War (1826–1828), led decisive campaigns of the Caucasian War
- Eduard Totleben, general and military engineer, hero of the Siege of Sevastopol (1854–1855)
- Kliment Voroshilov, Civil War commander, statesman, double HSU
- Mikhail Vorotynsky, defeated the Ottoman and Crimean Khanate army in the Battle of Molodi, eliminating the threat of Ottoman expansion into Russia

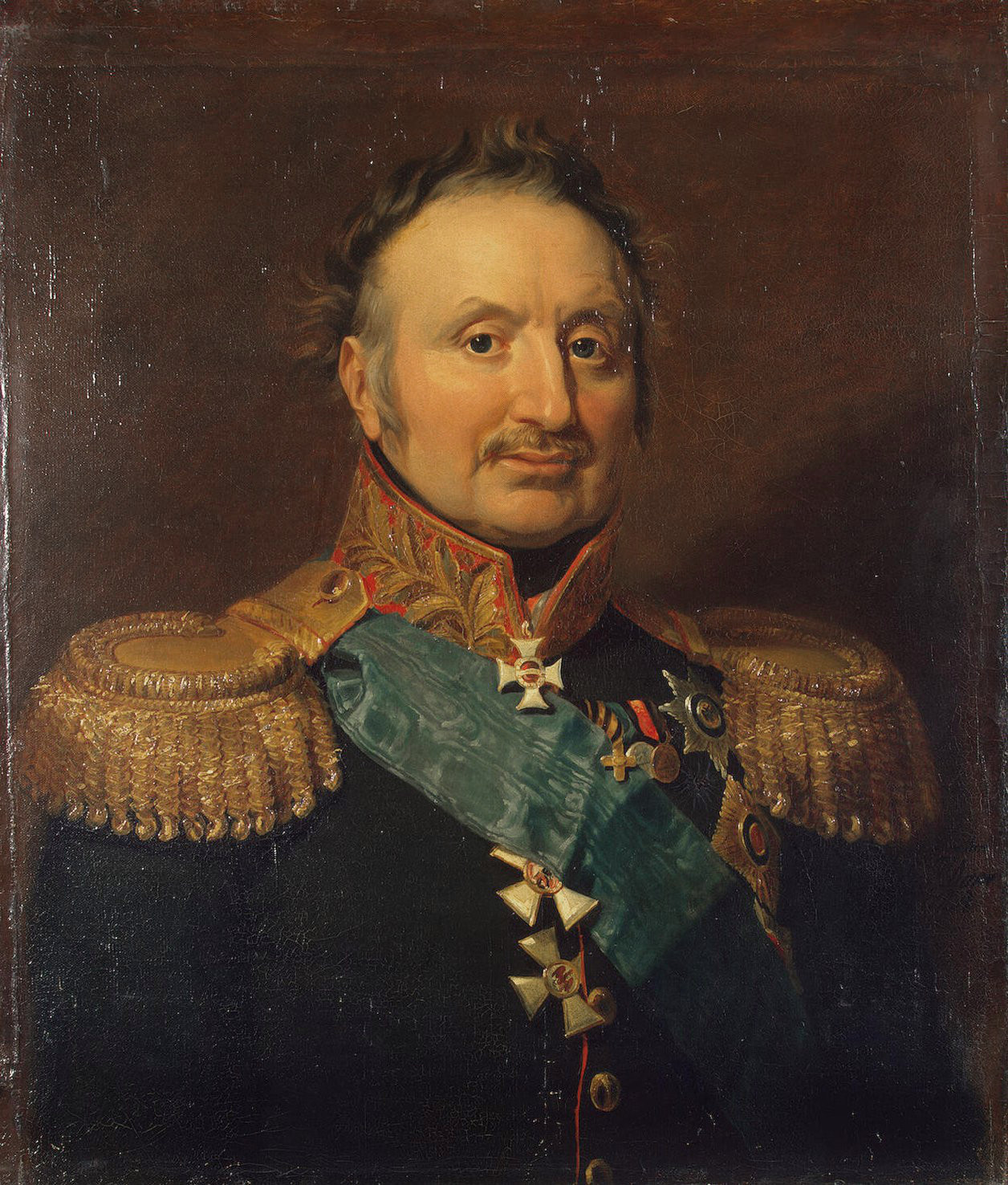
Peter Wittgenstein

- Peter Wittgenstein, field marshal, defended St Petersburg in 1812, hero of the War of the Sixth Coalition
- Ivan Yakubovsky, Soviet marshal, commander-in-chief of the Warsaw Pact under Brezhnev, double HSU
- Aleksey Yermolov, hero of the Napoleonic Wars and the Battle of Borodino, military ruler of the Caucasus at the start of the Caucasian War
- Andrey Yeryomenko, World War II Soviet marshal, prominent in the Battle of Stalingrad
- Yunus-bek Yevkurov, paratrooper, commander of Russian peacekeepers during the NATO bombing of Yugoslavia, Head of Ingushetia, Hero of Russia
- Vasily Zaytsev, Soviet sniper, killed 412 enemy soldiers and officers, including 6 snipers, a hero of the Battle of Stalingrad
- Georgy Zhukov, Soviet marshal, chief of the General Staff and representative of STAVKA, four times the Hero of the Soviet Union, oversaw all the main Soviet battle operations of the Eastern Front (World War II), inspected the Moscow Victory Parade of 1945

=== Navy ===
- Fyodor Apraksin, general admiral, won the Battle of Gangut during the Great Northern War, led the Russian Navy in the Russo-Persian War (1722–1723)
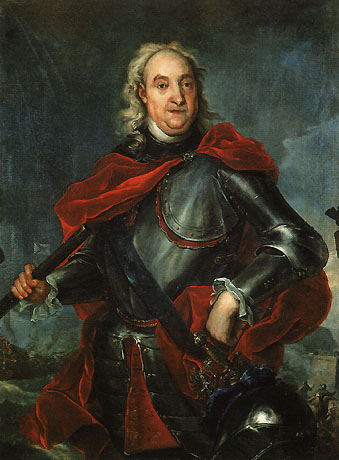
  Fyodor Apraksin
- Aksel Berg, admiral and scientist, major developer of radiolocation and cybernetics
- Vasily Chichagov, admiral, polar explorer, won the battles of Öland, Reval and Vyborg Bay, effectively bringing the Russo-Swedish War (1788–1790) to an end
- Cornelius Cruys, vice-admiral, the first commander of the Russian Baltic Fleet
- Fyodor Dubasov, admiral, placed Dalny and Port Arthur under Russian control
- Sergey Gorshkov, admiral, led major landing operations during WII, commander-in-chief of the Soviet Navy during most of the Cold War
- Samuel Greig, admiral, won the Battle of Chesma during the Russo-Turkish War (1768–1774) and the Battle of Hogland during the Russo-Swedish War (1788–1790)
- Ivan Grigorovich, admiral, chief of Port Arthur's port during the Siege of Port Arthur
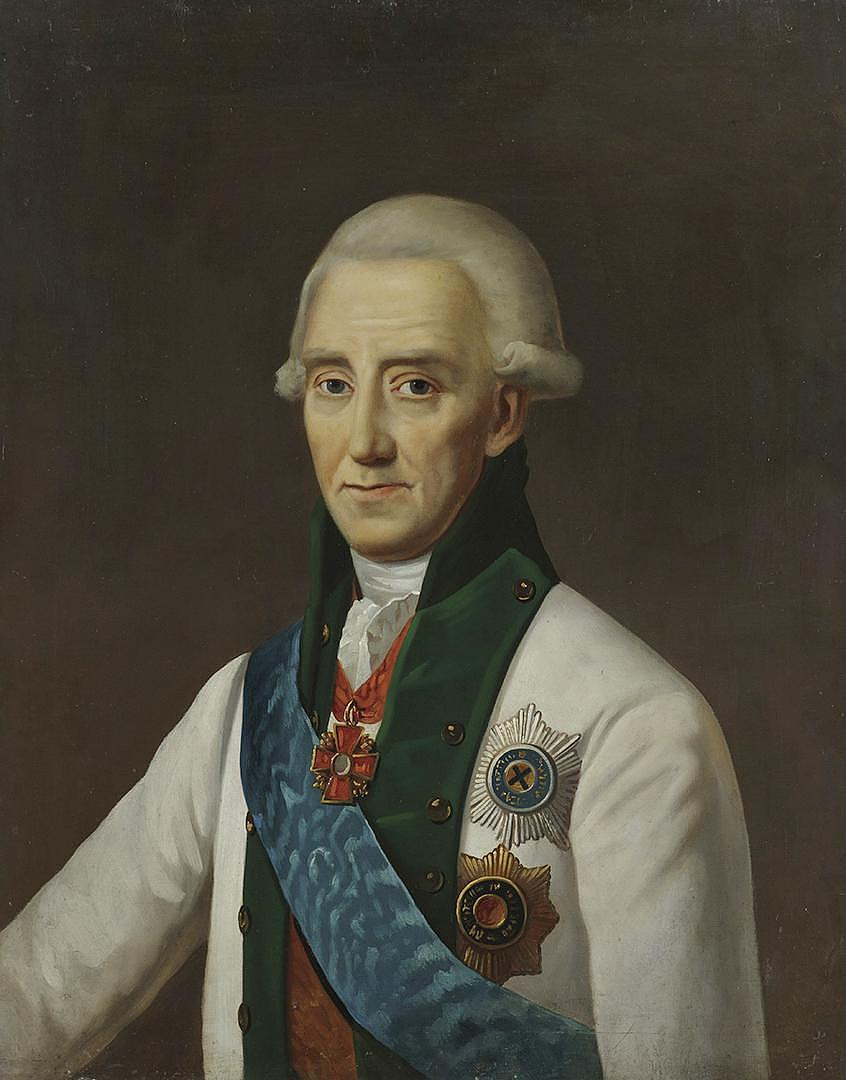
  Vasily Chichagov
- Lodewijk van Heiden, admiral who won the Battle of Navarino
- Ivan Isakov, admiral, held the rank Admiral of the Fleet of the Soviet Union, served during World War II
- Vladimir Istomin, rear-admiral, hero of the Siege of Sevastopol (1854–1855) during the Crimean War, died in action
- Aleksandr Kolchak, admiral, polar explorer, a leader of the White movement during the Russian Civil War
- Vladimir Kornilov, vice-admiral, hero of the Siege of Sevastopol (1854–1855), died in the Battle of Malakoff
- Nikolay Krabbe, admiral and naval minister, co-founded the first Russian naval bases in Primorsky Krai, oversaw the development of naval artillery and ironclad ships
- Nikolay Kuznetsov, admiral, World War II commander-in-chief of the Soviet Navy
- Mikhail Lazarev, admiral, three times circumnavigator and discoverer of Antarctica,
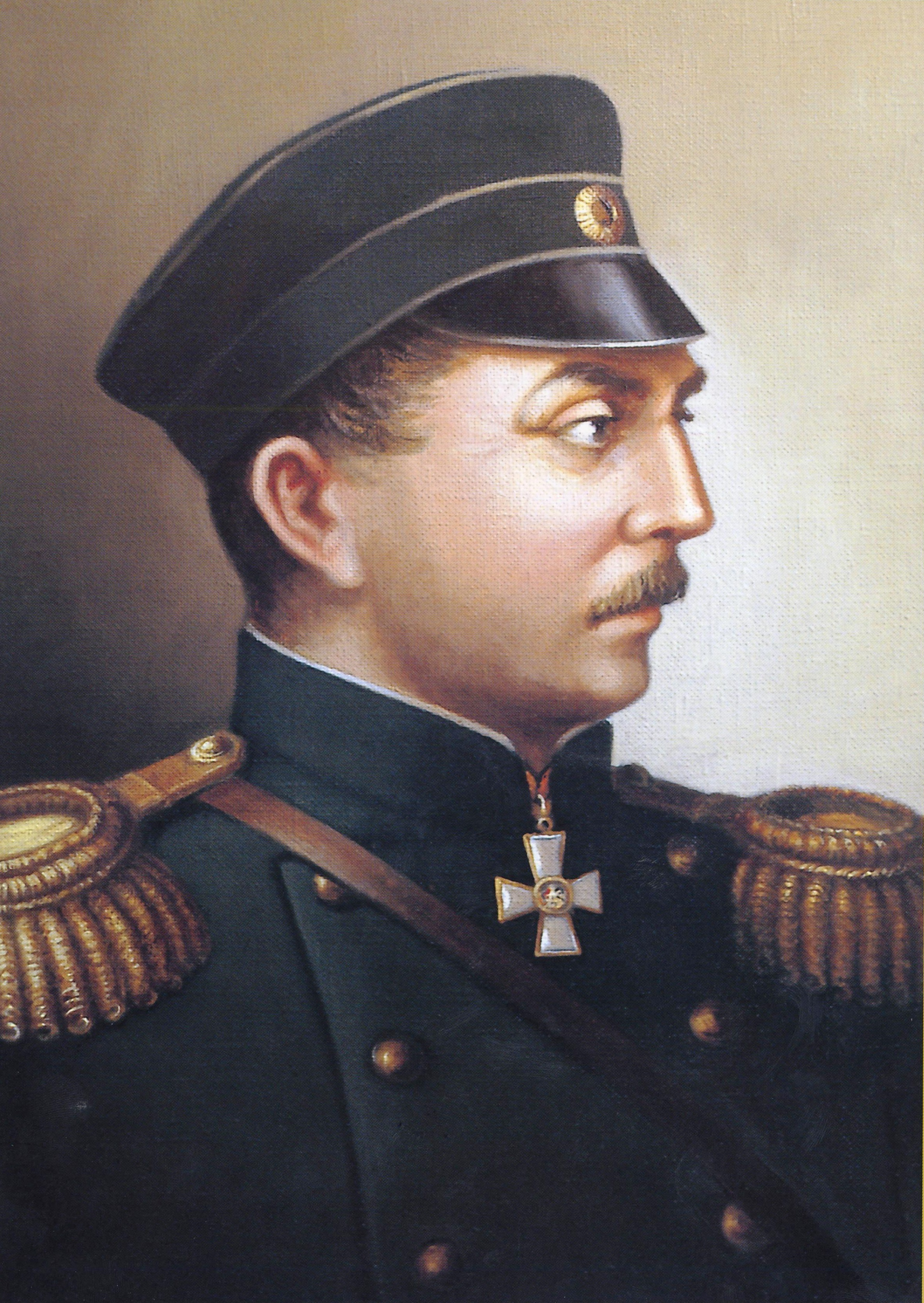
  Pavel Nakhimov
  destroyed five enemy warships as a commander of Azov in the Battle of Navarino, tutor to Nakhimov, Kornilov and Istomin
- Stepan Makarov, vice-admiral, inventor and explorer, performed the first ever successful torpedo attack (during the Russo-Turkish War of 1877–1878), built the first torpedo boat tender and the first polar icebreaker, author of the insubmersibility theory, killed in the Russo-Japanese War when his ship struck a naval mine
- Pavel Nakhimov, admiral, circumnavigated the world with Mikhail Lazarev, fought in the Battle of Navarino, annihilated the Ottoman fleet in the Battle of Sinope, commander and hero at the Siege of Sevastopol (1854–1855)
- Andrey Popov, admiral, hero of the Crimean War, led a Russian flotilla to support the Union during the American Civil War, designed the first true Russian battleship Pyotr Velikiy
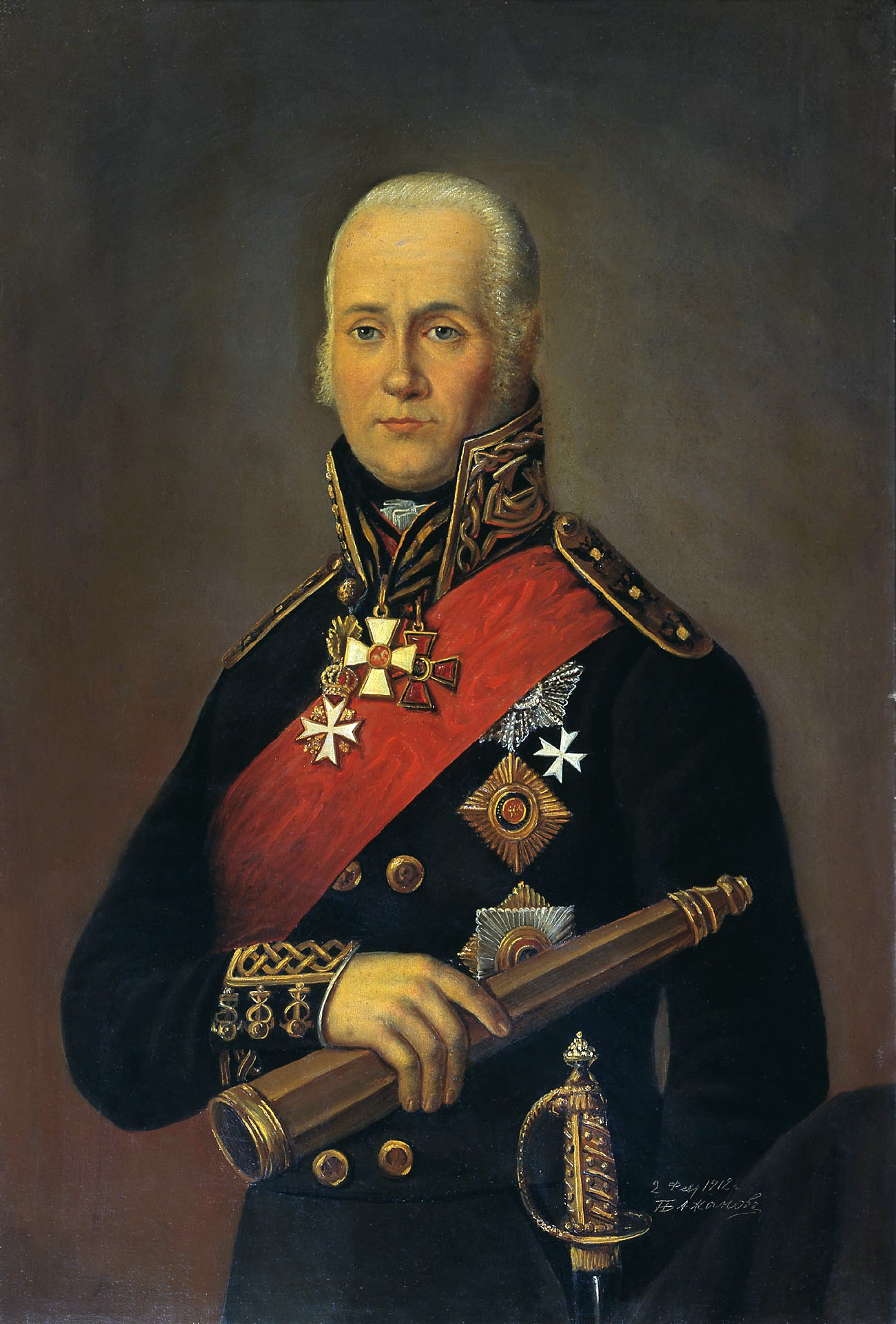
  Fyodor Ushakov
- José de Ribas, vice-admiral, founder of Odessa, hero of the Siege of Izmail
- Grand Duke Alexei Alexandrovich, general admiral and Naval Minister during the Russo-Japanese War
- Grand Duke Konstantin Nikolayevich, general admiral and statesman, oversaw the rapid transition of the Russian Navy to ironclad warships
- Alexei Senyavin, re-established the Don Military Flotilla and played a crucial role in Russia's gaining access to the Black Sea
- Dmitry Senyavin, admiral, won the battle of the Dardanelles (1807) and the battle of Athos against Ottomans during the Napoleonic Wars
- Naum Senyavin, vice-admiral, won the Battle of Osel during the Great Northern War
- Grigory Spiridov, admiral, destroyed the Ottoman fleet in the Battle of Chesma during the Russo-Turkish War (1768–1774)
- Jean de Traversay, admiral, commanded the Russian Black Sea Fleet and Russian Baltic Fleet, organised early Russian circumnavigations
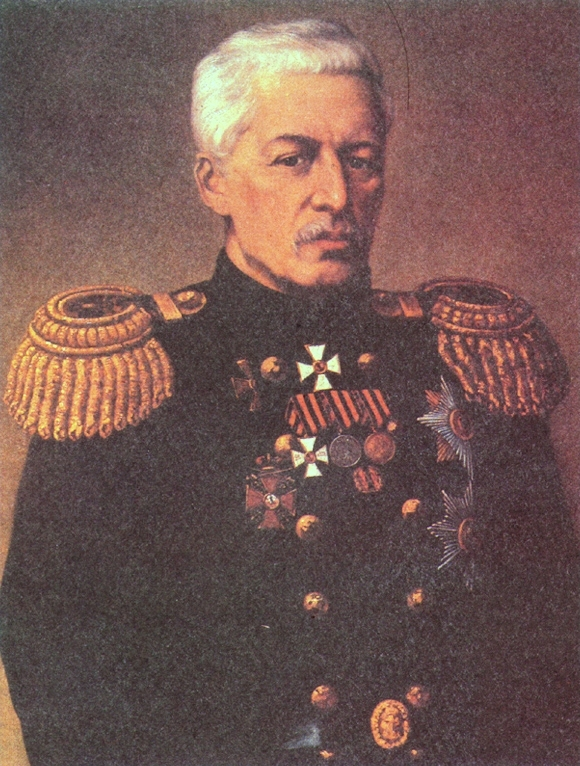
  Vasily Zavoyko
- Vladimir Tributs, admiral, a leading navy commander during the Siege of Leningrad, led the Soviet evacuation of Tallinn
- Fyodor Ushakov, the most illustrious Russian admiral of the 18th century, saint, won the battles of Fidonisi, Kerch Strait, Tendra and Cape Kaliakra during the Russo-Turkish War (1787–1792), single-handedly carved out the Greek Septinsular Republic, did not lose a single ship in 43 battles
- Ivan Yumashev, admiral, reclaimed Southern Sakhalin and Kuril Islands for the USSR during the Soviet–Japanese War, commander-in-chief of the Soviet Navy in the late 1940s
- Vasily Zavoyko, fought in the Battle of Navarino, twice circumnavigated the globe, explored the estuary of the Amur River, repelled the superior British-French forces in the Siege of Petropavlovsk during the Crimean War
- Matija Zmajević, vice-admiral, hero of the battle of Gangut and the battle of Grengam during the Great Northern War

=== Air Force ===
- Yekaterina Budanova, World War II pilot, one of the world's two female fighter aces
- Valery Chkalov, leader of the first ultralong flight from Moscow to the Russian Far East, leader of the first transcontinental flight by airplane over the North Pole, Hero of the Soviet Union
- Mikhail Devyatayev, fighter pilot known for his incredible escape aboard a stolen bomber from a Nazi concentration camp on the Baltic island of Usedom, Hero of the Soviet Union
- Nikolai Gastello, first Soviet pilot to direct his burning aircraft on a ground target, HSU
- Alexander Golovanov, chief marshal of Aviation at the end of World War II, commander of Long Range Aviation
- Sergey Gritsevets, fighter ace during the Spanish Civil War and the Battle of Khalkhin Gol, the first to become twice the Hero of the Soviet Union
- Valentina Grizodubova, one of the first Soviet female pilots and Heroes of the Soviet Union, set a record for woman's ultralong flights
- Mikhail Gromov, set a record during the transcontinental flight over the North Pole, founded the Gromov Flight Research Institute, HSU
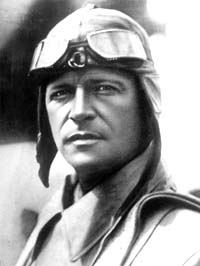
  Gromov
- Vladimir Ilyushin, test pilot for OKB Sukhoi, HSU
- Nikolai Kamanin, polar aviator, among the first to receive the title Hero of the Soviet Union, trained the first ever cosmonauts, including Yuri Gagarin, Gherman Titov and Alexei Leonov
- Alexander Kazakov, most successful Russian flying ace of World War I, the first to perform an aerial ramming and survive
- Sergei Khudyakov, Marshal of Aviation during World War II, Chief of Staff of the Soviet Air Force
- Vladimir Kokkinaki, famous Soviet test pilot, set 22 world records, a president of the Fédération Aéronautique Internationale, double HSU
- Zinaïda Kokorina, pilot and flight instructor, in 1925 became the world's first military pilot
- Ivan Kozhedub, top fighter ace in the aviation of the Allies of World War II, credited with 62 individual victories, thrice the Hero of the Soviet Union
- Pavel Kutakhov, World War II fighter ace, chief marshal of Aviation under Leonid Brezhnev, double HSU
- Sigizmund Levanevsky, polar aviator, among the first to receive the title Hero of the Soviet Union, died in a transpolar flight attempt
- Anatoly Liapidevsky, polar aviator, the first person to receive the title Hero of the Soviet Union, general major of Aviation
- Lydia Litvyak, World War II pilot, one of the world's two female fighter aces, HSU
- Alexey Maresyev, World War II fighter ace, HSU, the prototype for The Story of a Real Man
- Ivan Nagurski, first polar aviator, World War I flying ace
- Pyotr Nesterov, inventor and pioneer of aerobatics, the first pilot to perform the aerobatic loop, died in the world's first aerial ramming during World War I
- Alexander Novikov, chief marshal of Aviation during World War II, double HSU
- Yevgeny Pepelyaev, top Soviet fighter ace in the Korean War, HSU
- Viktor Pokrovsky, World War I flying ace, the first Russian pilot to capture an enemy plane and pilot
- Alexander Pokryshkin, World War II fighter ace, credited with 59 individual victories, triple Hero of the Soviet Union, Marshal of Aviation
- Georgy Prokofiev, balloonist who coordinated military stratospheric balloon program in the 1930s, set world record in altitude on USSR-1
- Viktor Pugachyov, test pilot and pioneer of supermaneuverability, the first to show Pugachev's Cobra maneuver of Su-27
- Endel Puusepp, long-range bomber pilot, famous for flying a Soviet delegation over the front line from Moscow to Washington, D.C. and back to negotiate the opening of the Western Front, HSU
- Marina Raskova, navigator, founder of the three female air regiments during World War II, HSU
- Yevgeniya Rudneva, World War II bomber pilot, one of the Night Witches, HSU
- Yevgeniya Shakhovskaya, first woman military pilot
- Mark Shevelev, World War II Soviet polar aviation commander, HSU
- Lev Shestakov, top Soviet fighter ace during the Spanish Civil War, HSU
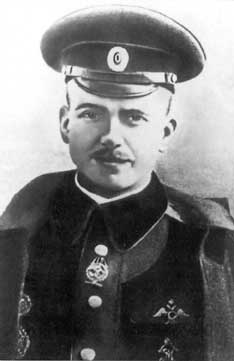
  Pyotr Nesterov
- Yakov Smushkevich, commanded the Soviet aviation in the Spanish Civil War and the Battle of Khalkhin Gol, double HSU
- Nelson Stepanyan, World War II dive bomber pilot, destroyed scores of enemy ships, tanks, cars, planes and guns, double HSU
- Nikolay Sutyagin, top Korean War Soviet fighter ace, HSU
- Victor Talalikhin, World War II fighter ace, among the first to perform aerial ramming at night, HSU
- Andrey Vitruk, World War II fighter ace, major general of Aviation, Hero of the Soviet Union and the Hero of Yugoslavia
- Mikhail Vodopianov, polar aviator, among the first to receive the title Hero of the Soviet Union, commanded the first World War II Soviet air raid on Berlin in 1941
- Yekaterina Zelenko, World War II pilot, the only woman ever to have performed and died in aerial ramming, HSU

== Religious figures ==
=== Orthodox leaders ===
- Metropolitan Alexius, saint, ruled Russia during Prince Dmitry Donskoy's minority
- Patriarch Alexy I, longest serving Patriarch in the Soviet era
- Patriarch Alexy II, first post-Soviet Patriarch, oversaw the period of major church restoration and religious renaissance
- Metropolitan Isidore, attempted a reunion with the Roman Catholic Church, which instead led to independence of the Russian Orthodox Church
- Patriarch Job, last Metropolitan and the first Patriarch of Moscow and All Russia
- Patriarch Kirill, current Patriarch of Moscow and all Russia
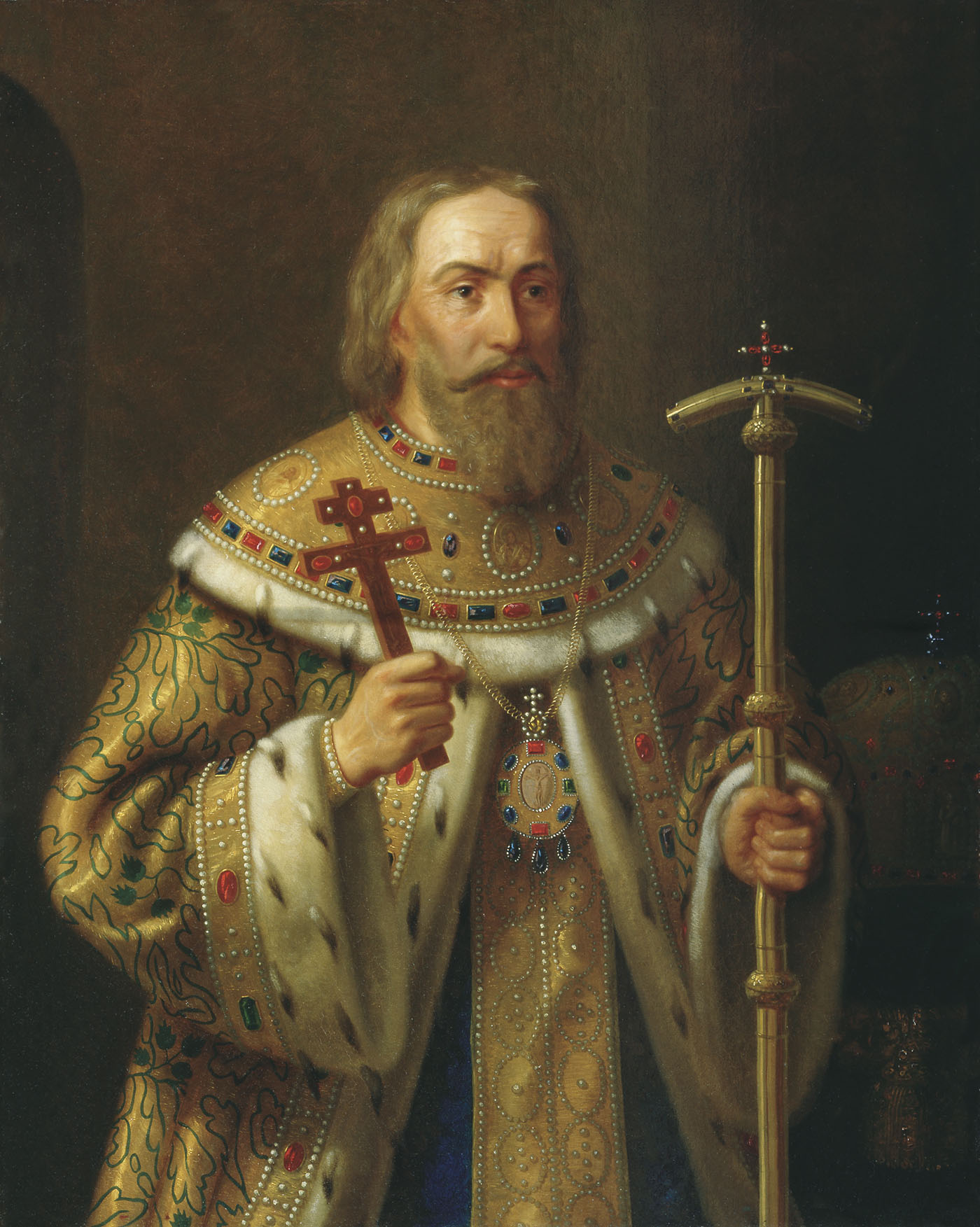
  Patriarch Philaret
- Metropolitan Macarius, saint, prominent iconographer
- Patriarch Nikon, introduced major church reforms which eventually led to a lasting schism in the Russian Orthodox Church, known as Raskol
- Metropolitan Philaret, saint, the principal Russian theologian of the 19th century
- Patriarch Philaret, de facto ruler of Russia during the minority of his son, Tsar Mikhail
- Patriarch Pimen, oversaw the end of the persecution of Christianity in the Soviet Union and the 1000th anniversary of the Baptism of Rus'
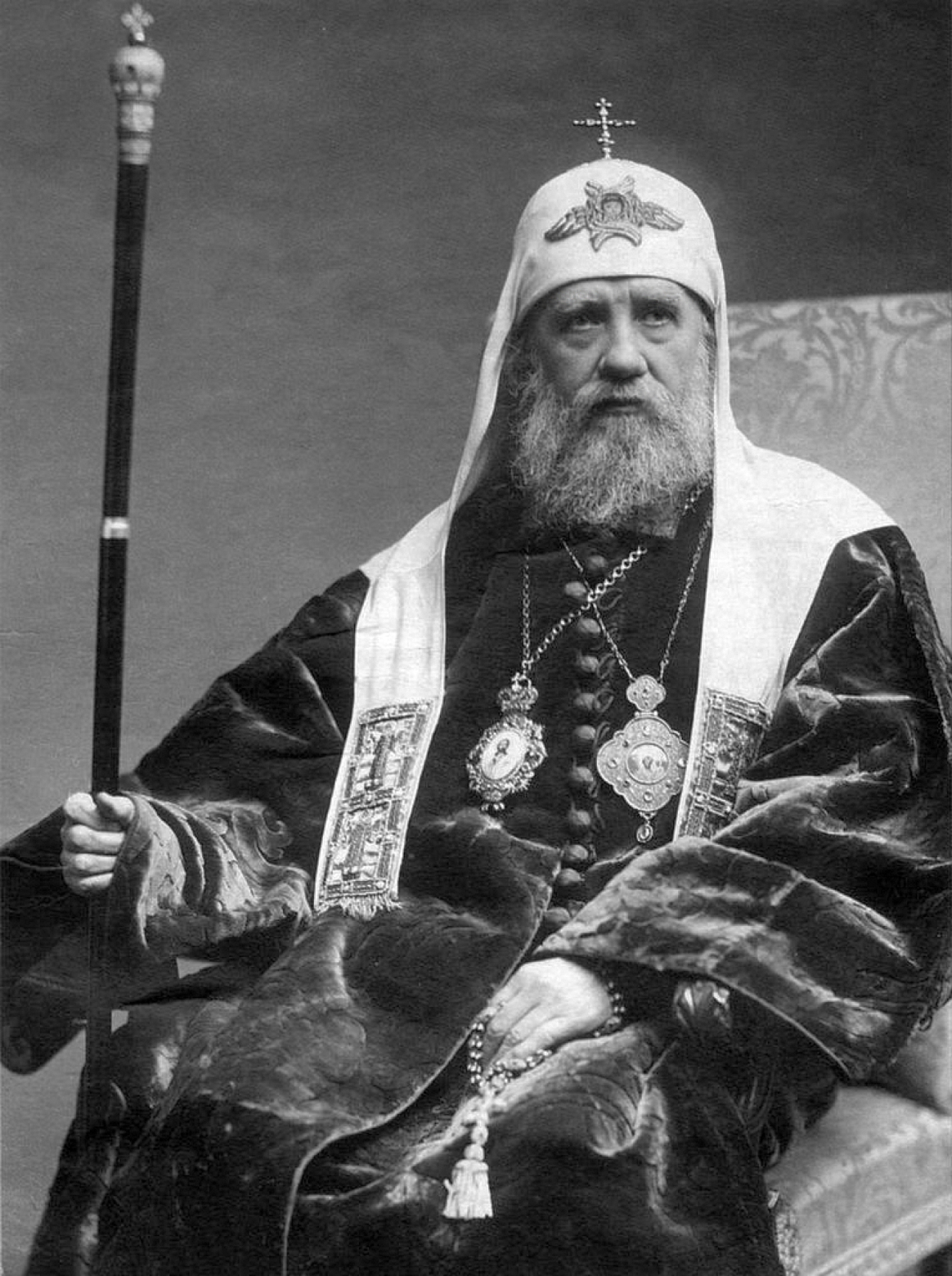
  Patriarch Tikhon
- Metropolitan Platon, held posts in both Russia and Argentina
- Patriarch Sergius, led the Russian Orthodox Church during World War II, when the earlier Soviet militant atheism was scaled down and the Church was re-legalised
- Patriarch Tikhon, first Patriarch of Moscow and All Russia after restoration of the Patriarchate in the early Soviet era

=== Orthodox saints ===
- Alexander Nevsky, Prince of Novgorod and Vladimir, military hero, patron saint and the Name of Russia
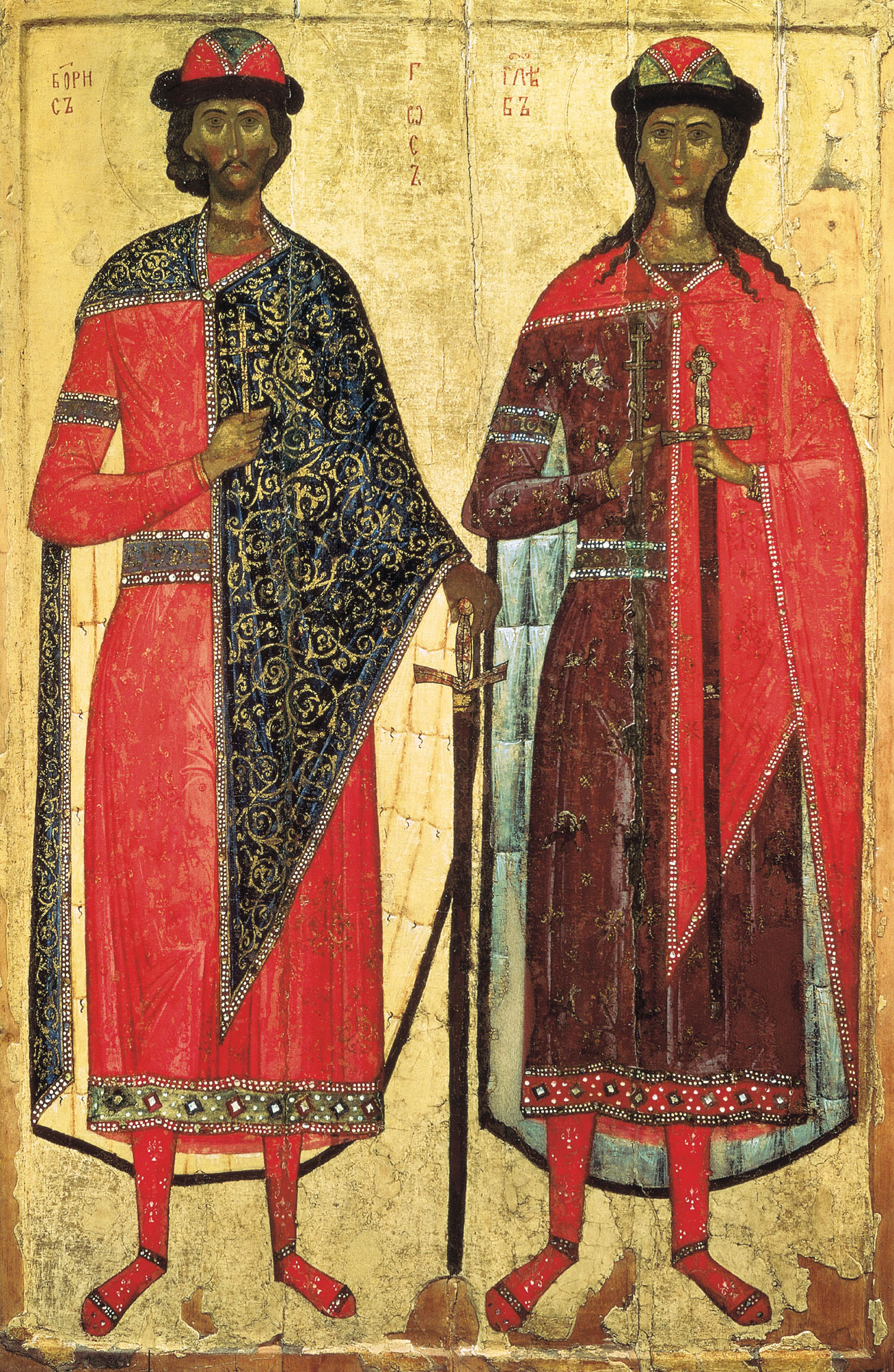
  Boris and Gleb
- Andrei Rublev, famous icon-painter, author of the Trinity
- Anthony of Kiev, co-founder of the Kyiv Pechersk Lavra, the first monastery in Russia
- Basil Fool for Christ, yurodivy who gave his name to St. Basil's Cathedral on the Red Square
- Boris and Gleb, children of Vladimir the Great, the first saints canonized in Kievan Rus'
- Tsarevich Dmitry, son of Ivan IV, mysteriously died or killed, later impersonated by the impostors False Dmitry I and False Dmitry II during the Time of Troubles
- Dmitry Donskoy, war hero, the first Prince of Moscow to openly challenge Mongol authority in Russia
- Feodor Kuzmich, starets who according to a legend was in fact Alexander I of Russia who faked his death to become a hermit
- Ioakim Korsunianin, first bishop of Novgorod the Great and builder of the original wooden Saint Sophia Cathedral in Novgorod
- John of Shanghai and San Francisco, a leader of the Russian Orthodox Church Outside of Russia
- Kirill of Beloozero, founder of Kirillo-Belozersky Monastery
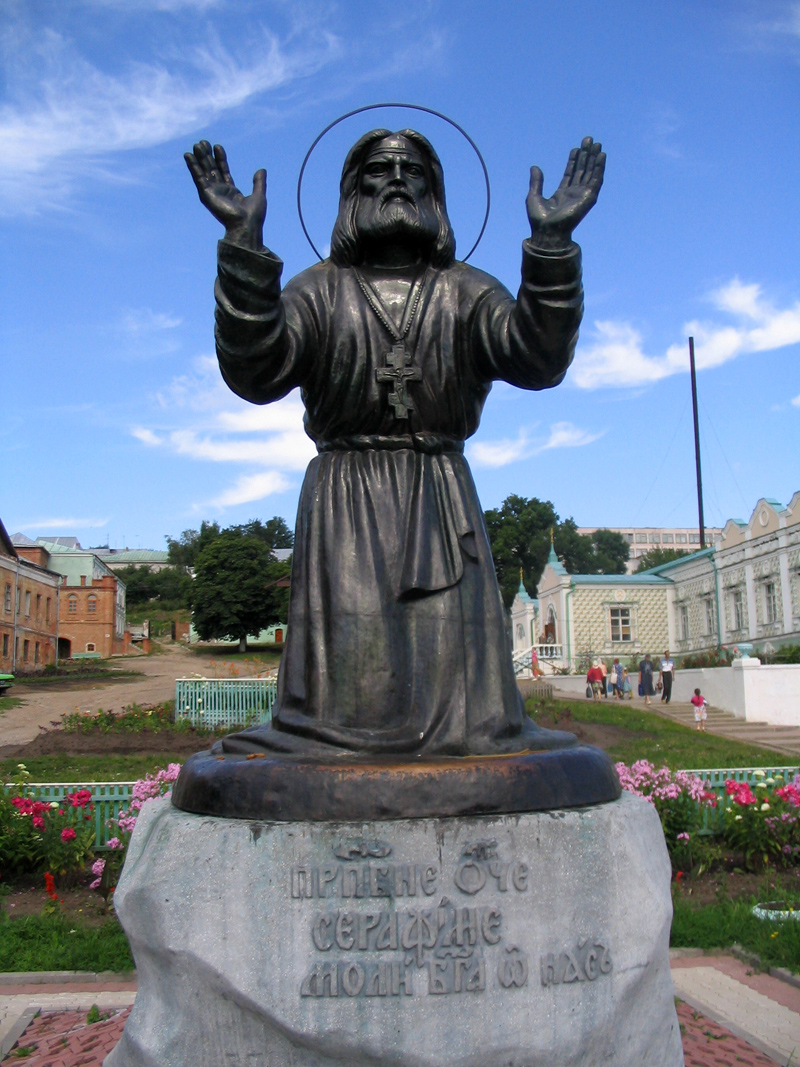
  Seraphim of Sarov
- Maximus the Greek, 16th-century humanist scholar
- Nicholas II of Russia, last Russian emperor, killed in the Civil War with his family; they were beatified as new-martyrs
- Nicholas of Japan, brought the Eastern Orthodoxy to Japan
- Olga of Kiev, first Christian among Russian rulers
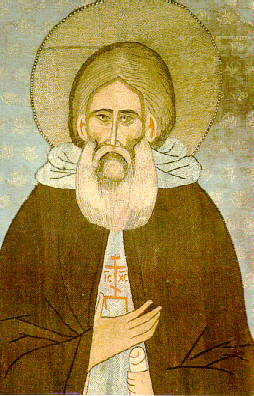
  Sergius of Radonezh
- Savvatiy, founder of Solovetsky Monastery
- Sergius of Radonezh, patron saint of Russia, spiritual and monastic reformer, founder of the Trinity Sergius Lavra, blessed Dmitry Donskoy for the Battle of Kulikovo
- Vladimir I of Kiev "the Great", Kievan prince who turned from pagan to saint and enacted the Christianization of Kievan Rus'

== Explorers ==
=== Siberian explorers ===
- Vladimir Atlasov, explorer and coloniser of Kamchatka
  Semyon Dezhnyov
- Pyotr Beketov, discoverer of Buryatia, founder of Yakutsk and Chita
- Ivan Chersky, geologist and explorer of Siberia, explained the origin of Lake Baikal
- Semyon Dezhnyov, discoverer of Kolyma, Chukchi Peninsula, Bering Strait and the east extremity of Eurasia, Cape Dezhnyov
- Johann Georg Gmelin, traveled over 34,000 km through Siberia, discovered that the Caspian Sea lies below the ocean level
- Kurbat Ivanov, discoverer of Lake Baikal, author of the earliest maps of the Russian Far East and the Bering Strait area
- Yerofey Khabarov, second Russian to explore the Amur River, founder of Khabarovsk
- Stepan Krasheninnikov, explorer and author of the first detailed description of Kamchatka
- Alexander Middendorf, explorer of the Taymyr Peninsula, founder of permafrost science, discoverer of Putorana Plateau
- Nicolae Milescu, explorer of Siberia and China, the first to point out Baikal's unfathomable depth
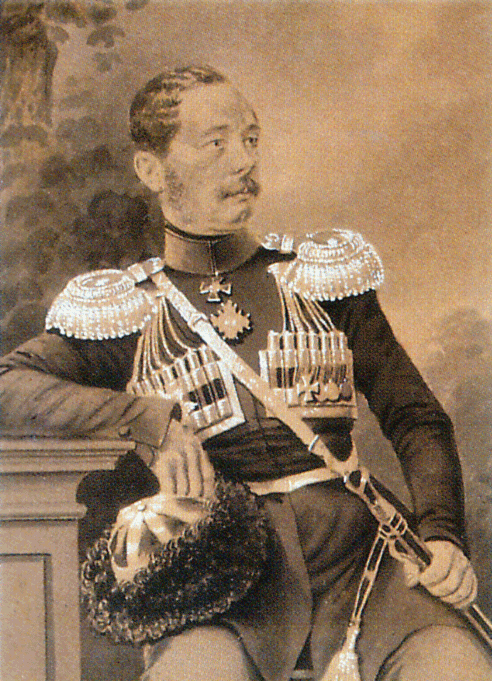
  Nikolay Muravyov-Amursky
- Ivan Moskvitin, first Russian to reach the Pacific Ocean, discoverer of the Sea of Okhotsk
- Nikolay Muravyov-Amursky, explorer and coloniser of the Amurland and Primorsky Krai
- Gennady Nevelskoy, founder of Nikolayevsk-on-Amur, proved that Sakhalin is an island
- Vladimir Obruchev, geologist, explorer of Siberia and Central Asia, wrote the comprehensive Geology of Siberia and two popular science fiction and travel novels, Plutonia and Sannikov Land
- Maksim Perfilyev, discoverer of Transbaikalia, founder of Yeniseysk and Bratsk
- Fedot Popov, discoverer of Chukotka and the Bering Strait, possible discoverer of Kamchatka
- Vassili Poyarkov, discoverer of the Amurland, the first Russian to sail down the Amur River
- Demid Pyanda, credited with discovery of the Lena River and Yakutia, made an 8,000 km long journey along the previously unknown Siberian rivers
- Semyon Remezov, author of the Remezov Chronicle and the first large format cartographic atlas of Siberia
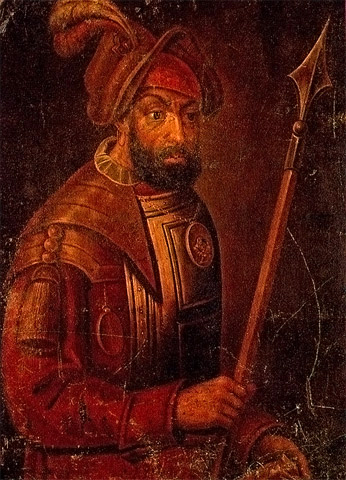
  Yermak Timofeyevich
- Nikolay Shkot, explorer of Sakhalin and Primorsky Krai, a founder of Nakhodka and Vladivostok
- Alexander Sibiryakov, sponsor of the multiple expeditions in Siberia and the Arctic
- Mikhail Stadukhin, discoverer of Kolyma, Chukotka and the northern Okhotsk Sea
- Anikey Stroganov, coloniser of Perm Krai and the Urals, established the early trade between Russia and Siberian tribes
- Semyon Stroganov, coloniser of the Urals and Siberia, sponsor of Yermak's conquest of the Khanate of Sibir
- Vasily Tatishchev, supervisor of the first instrumental mapping of Russia, coloniser of the Urals and Siberia, founder of Perm and Yekaterinburg
- Tatyana Ustinova, discoverer of the Valley of Geysers in Kamchatka, the world's second largest geyser concentration
- Yermak Timofeyevich, conqueror of Siberia, explorer of West Siberian rivers
- Ivan Yevreinov, author of the first instrumental maps of Kamchatka and the Kuril Islands

=== Explorers of Russian America ===
- Alexander Baranov, explorer and governor of Russian America, founder of Fort Ross in California
- Vitus Bering, organiser of the Great Northern Expedition, explorer of the Bering Sea and the Bering Strait, founder of Petropavlovsk-Kamchatsky, discoverer of the southern Alaska, the Aleutian Islands and the Commander Islands
- Aleksei Chirikov, discoverer of the Aleutian Islands and the northwestern coast of North America
- Ivan Fyodorov, discoverer of Alaska
- Mikhail Gvozdev, discoverer of Alaska, author of the first instrumental maps of the Okhotsk Sea and Sakhalin shores
- Gerasim Izmailov, author of the first detailed map of the Aleutian Islands, founder of the first permanent Russian settlement in America
- Otto von Kotzebue, circumnavigator, discoverer of a number of Pacific islands and Kotzebue Sound on Alaska
- Gavriil Pribylov, discoverer of the Pribilof Islands
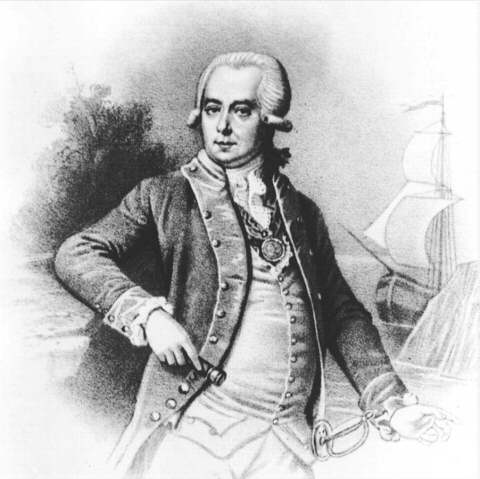
  Grigory Shelikhov
- Nikolai Rezanov, founder of the Russian-American Company, protagonist of the rock opera Juno and Avos
- Gavriil Sarychev, explorer of the Sea of Okhotsk and the Aleutian Islands
- Grigory Shelikhov, founded the precursor of the Russian-American Company and the first permanent Russian settlements in America
- Lavrenty Zagoskin, author of the first detailed description of the inner areas of Alaska

=== Circumnavigators ===
- Fyodor Konyukhov, adventurer, the first Russian to complete the Three Poles Challenge and Explorers Grand Slam, set a record for the solo yacht circumnavigation of Antarctica
- Mikhail Lazarev, discoverer of Antarctica and a number of Pacific islands, triple circumnavigator, war hero
- Yuri Lisyansky, leader of the first Russian circumnavigation, discoverer of a number of Pacific islands
- Fyodor Litke, oceanographer, explorer of Novaya Zemlya, Bering Sea, Bonin Islands, and the Carolines, double circumnavigator
- Konstantin Posyet, participant of the circumnavigation on the frigate Pallas,
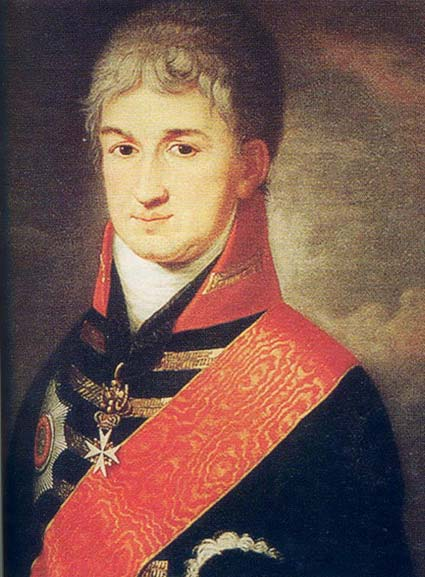
  Nikolai Rezanov
  expert on Japan, explorer of the Possiet Bay, Minister of Ways and Communications of Russia
- Yevfimy Putyatin, leader of the circumnavigation on Pallas, diplomat, explorer of the Sea of Japan
- Nikolai Rezanov, leader of the first Russian circumnavigation, explorer of the Russian America, protagonist of the rock opera Juno and Avos
- Fyodor Tolstoy, "the American", mischief-making participant of the first Russian circumnavigation, celebrity adventurer
- Ivan Unkovsky, leader of the circumnavigation on Pallas
- Vasily Zavoyko, double circumnavigator, explored the estuary of the Amur River, war hero

=== Travelers in the tropics ===
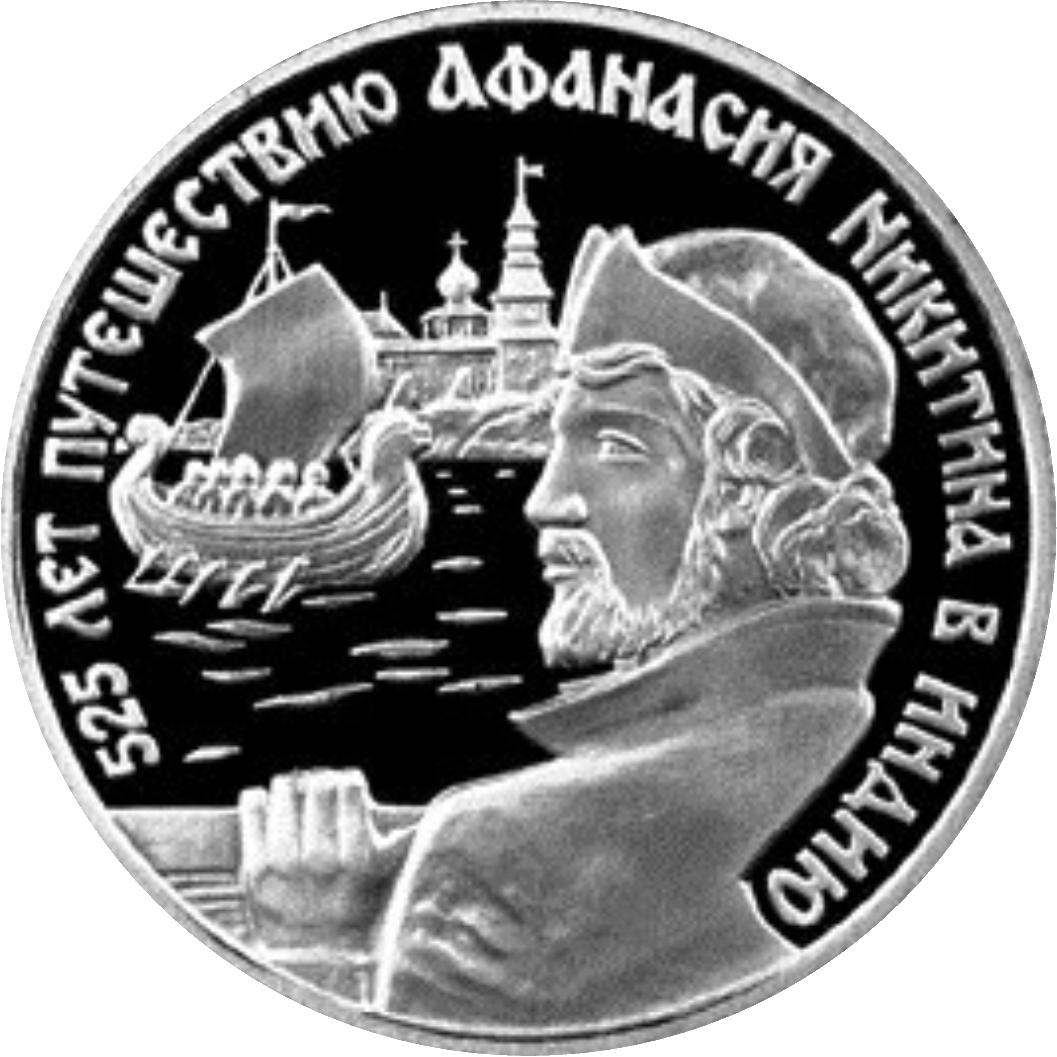
Afanasy Nikitin

- Alexander Bulatovich, military advisor of Menelek II of Ethiopia, explorer of Eastern Africa
- Wilhelm Junker, explorer of Eastern and Equatorial Africa
- Grigory Langsdorf, explorer of Alaska and Brazil
- Nicholai Miklukho-Maklai, anthropologist who lived and traveled among the natives of Papua New Guinea and Pacific islands, prominent anti-racist
- Afanasy Nikitin, one of the first Europeans to travel and to document his visit to India, author of A Journey Beyond the Three Seas
- Yuri Senkevich, participant of Thor Heyerdahl's voyages on the Ra, Ra II and Tigris (papyrus and reed boats), anchorman of the Travelers' Club TV show for the record 30 years

=== Explorers of Central Asia ===
- Alexander Bekovich-Cherkassky, leader of the first Russian military expeditions into Central Asia, founder of Krasnovodsk
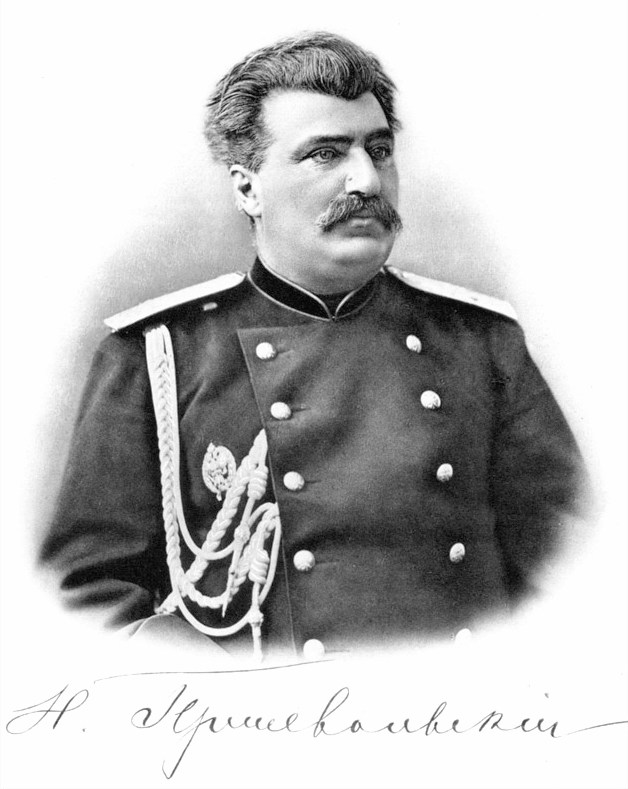
  Nikolai Przhevalsky
- Alexey Fedchenko, naturalist and explorer, discovered the Trans-Alay Range in Pamir Mountains
- Grigory Grum-Grshimailo, discoverer of Ayding Lake (the second lowest land point on Earth)
- Nikolai Korzhenevskiy, explorer of the Pamir, discoverer of the Academy of Sciences Range and Peak Korzhenevskaya
- Pyotr Kozlov, explorer of Mongolia, Xinjiang and Tibet, discoverer of the ancient Tangut city of Khara-Khoto
- Alexander Nevsky, medieval Russian Prince, saint and national hero, one of the first Europeans to travel into Mongolia (with his brother and father)
- Ivan Petlin, first Russian to reach China on an official diplomatic mission, left a popular description of his journey
- Grigory Potanin, explorer of Mongolia, Tibet and China
- Nikolai Przhevalsky, traveled over 40,000 km through Central Asia, discovered the only extant species of wild horse
- Nicholas Roerich, painter, philosopher, archeologist, writer and public figure, explorer of Mongolia, China and India
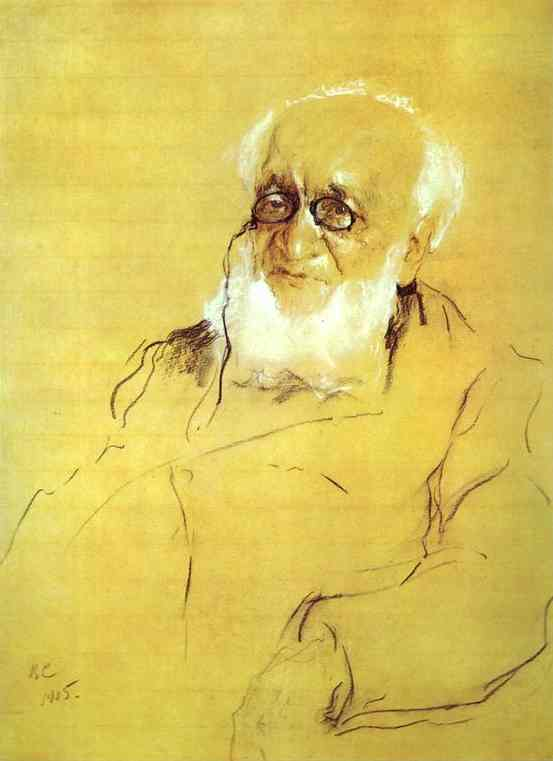
  Pyotr Semyonov-Tyan-Shansky
- Pyotr Semyonov-Tyan-Shansky, explorer of the Tian Shan Mountains, discoverer of the Peak Khan Tengri, for 40 years the head of the Russian Geographical Society
- Gombojab Tsybikov, explorer and the first photographer of Tibet

=== Polar explorers ===
- Pyotr Anjou, explorer of the New Siberian Islands and Arctic coastline
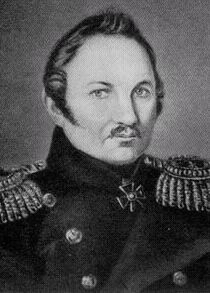
  Faddey Bellingshausen
- Faddey Bellingshausen, discoverer of Antarctica
- Vitus Bering, organiser of the Great Northern Expedition, explorer of the Bering Sea and the Bering Strait
- Georgy Brusilov, commander of Svyataya Anna, a prototype for The Two Captains
- Semion Chelyuskin, discoverer of the north extrimity of Eurasia, Cape Chelyuskin
- Artur Chilingarov, leader of the Arktika 2007 expedition, the first to reach the seabed under the North Pole
- Valery Chkalov, led the first transcontinental flight by airplane over the North Pole
- Semyon Dezhnyov, discoverer of Kolyma, Chukchi Peninsula, Bering Strait and Cape Dezhnyov
- Yakov Gakkel, oceanographer, creator of the first bathymetric map of the Arctic Ocean
- Matvei Gedenschtrom, explorer of the New Siberian Islands, discoverer of Siberian polynya
- Maria Klenova, a founder of marine geology, made the first complete seabed map of the Barents Sea, one of the first women explorers of Antarctic
- Ernst Krenkel, radioman for many polar expeditions, set a world record of long-distance radio communication (between Franz Josef Land and Antarctica)
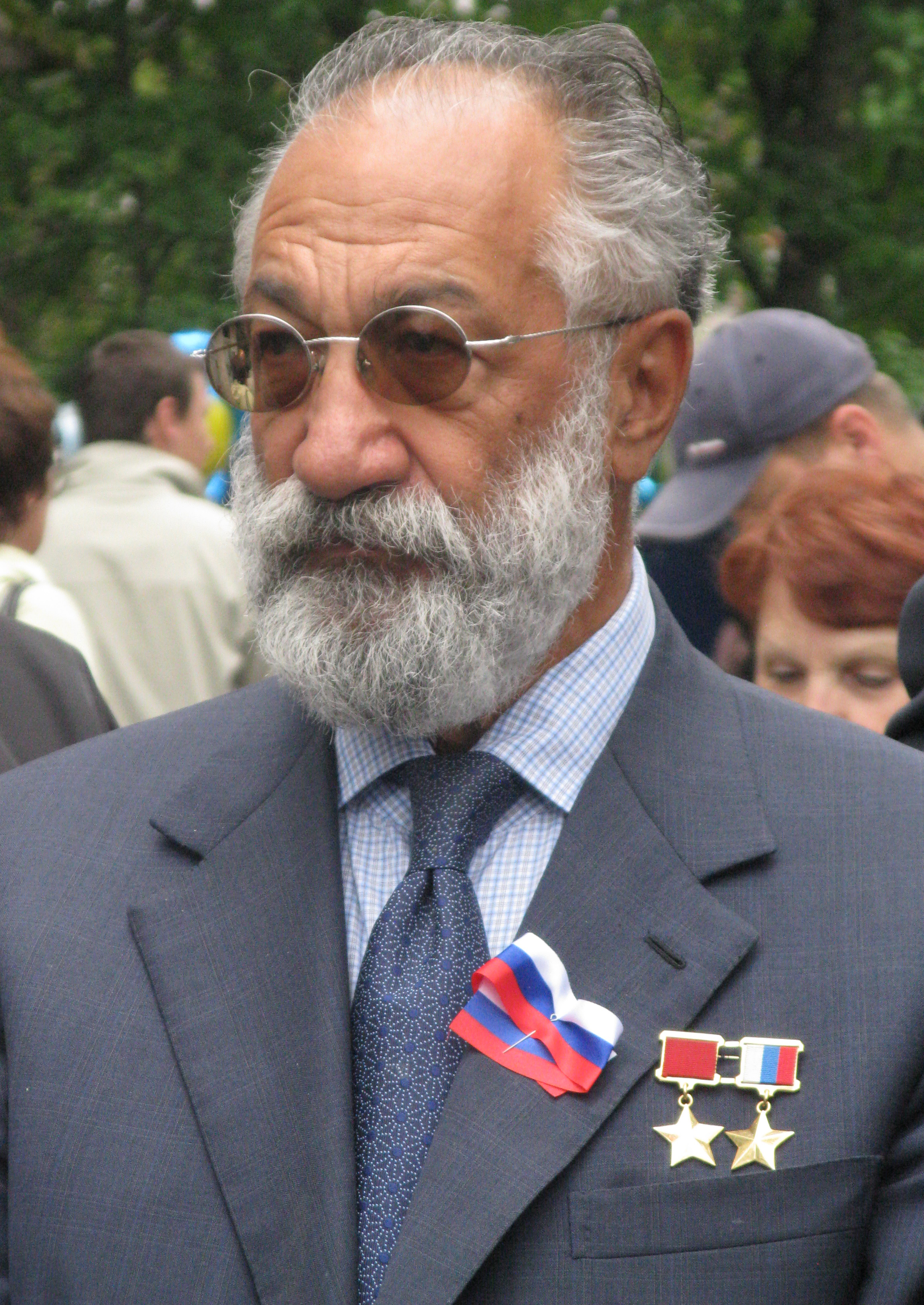
  Artur Chilingarov
- Dmitry Laptev, explorer of the Laptev Sea shores
- Khariton Laptev, explorer of the Laptev Sea shores
- Mikhail Lazarev, discoverer of Antarctica, war hero
- Fyodor Litke, explorer of Novaya Zemlya, Bering Sea, and Pacific
- Stepan Makarov, oceanographer, builder of the first polar icebreaker, war hero
- Stepan Malygin, author of the first Russian manual on navigation, leader of the western unit of the Great Northern Expedition
- Alexander Middendorf, explorer of Taymyr Peninsula, founder of permafrost science, discoverer of Putorana Plateau and the North Cape sea current
- Ivan Nagurski, first polar aviator
- Dmitry Ovtsyn, explorer of Taymyr Peninsula, mapped the Gydan Peninsula
- Pyotr Pakhtusov, explorer of Novaya Zemlya
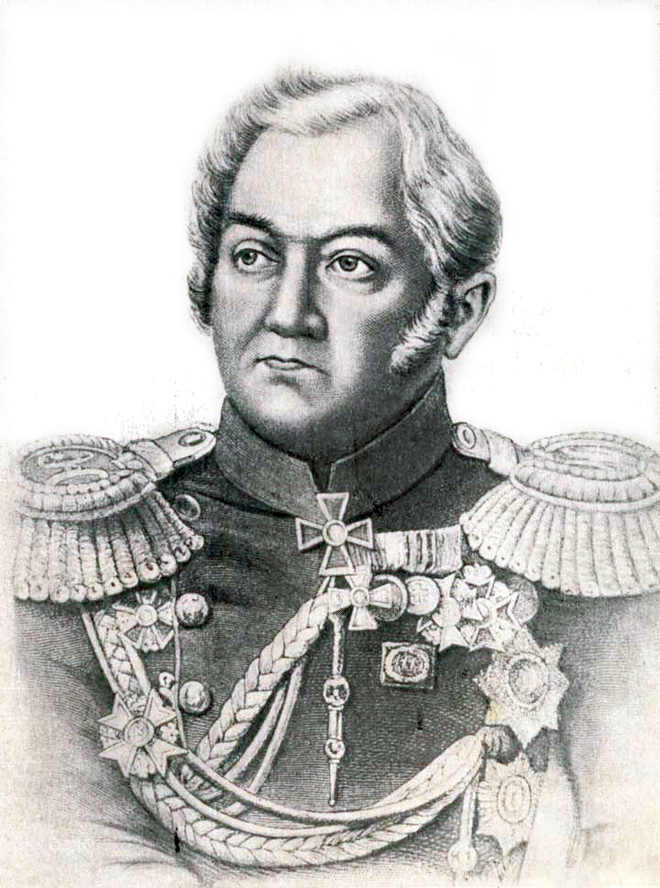
  Mikhail Lazarev
- Ivan Papanin, head of the first drifting ice station North Pole-1
- Fedot Popov, discoverer of Chukotka and the Bering Strait
- Vasili Pronchishchev, discovered the Byrranga Mountains and multiple islands off Taymyr Peninsula
- Tatiana Pronchishcheva, first female Arctic explorer
- Vladimir Rusanov, explorer of Novaya Zemlya and Svalbard, a prototype for The Two Captains
- Anatoly Sagalevich, performed the world's deepest fresh water dive (1637 m in Lake Baikal), explored the remains of RMS Titanic, the first to reach the seabed under the North Pole
- Rudolf Samoylovich, founder of the Arctic and Antarctic Research Institute, saver of the Airship Italia crew
- Yakov Sannikov, explorer of the New Siberian Islands, originated the legend about the Sannikov Land
- Otto Schmidt, leader of the first passage of the Northern Sea Route without wintering, supervised many Arctic expeditions
- Georgy Sedov, explorer of Novaya Zemlya and Kolyma River, died in attempt to reach the North Pole, a prototype for The Two Captains
- Pyotr Shirshov, member of the North Pole-1 crew, founder of Shirshov Institute of Oceanology, proved that there is life in high latitudes of the Arctic Ocean
- Alexander Sibiryakov, sponsor of the multiple expeditions in Siberia and the Arctic, including that of Adolf Erik Nordenskiöld
- Mikhail Somov, head of the second Soviet drifting ice station North Pole-2, leader of the 1st Soviet Antarctic Expedition, founder of the first Soviet Antarctic stations Mirny and Vostok
- Eduard Toll, explorer of Yakutia and the Arctic, died in search of the legendary Sannikov Land
- Yevgeny Tolstikov, head of the North Pole-4, led the 3rd Soviet Antarctic Expedition, discoverer of the Gamburtsev Mountains
- Alexey Tryoshnikov, head of the North Pole-3, led the 2nd and the 13th Soviet Antarctic Expeditions
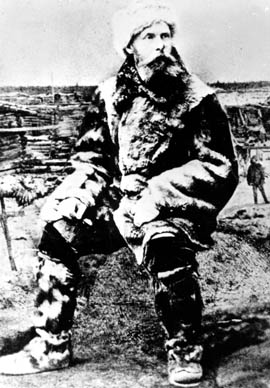
  Eduard Toll
- Nikolay Urvantsev, explorer of Severnaya Zemlya, discoverer of nickel in Taimyr and founder of Norilsk
- Georgy Ushakov, founder of the first settlement on the Wrangel Island, explorer of Severnaya Zemlya, discoverer of Ushakov Island (the last unknown island outside any archipelago)
- Boris Vilkitsky, discoverer of Severnaya Zemlya (the last archipelago on Earth to be explored), led the first voyage from Vladivostok to Arkhangelsk via the Northern Sea Route
- Vladimir Vize, scientific leader of many Arctic expeditions, predicted the location of Vize Island through the analysis of the pack ice movement in the Kara Sea
- Vladimir Voronin, leader of the first passage of the Northern Sea Route without wintering, captain of SS Chelyuskin
- Ferdinand Wrangel, explorer of the East Siberian Sea and Alaska

=== Cosmonauts ===
- Pavel Belyayev, member of the first two-person space crew
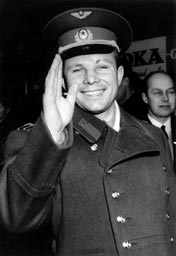
  Yuri Gagarin
- Georgy Beregovoy, oldest human to go into space (by date of birth, 1921)
- Valery Bykovsky, performer of the longest solo spaceflight
- Konstantin Feoktistov, member of the first three-person space crew
- Yuri Gagarin, first ever human to travel into space
- Yevgeny Khrunov, participant of the first dual spacewalk and crew transfer between spacecraft
- Vladimir Komarov, member of the first three-person space crew, the first human to die during a space mission (landing accident)
- Sergei Krikalyov, accumulated most time in space (803 days) during six flights
- Alexei Leonov, first to perform a spacewalk, a member of the first two-person space crew, space painter
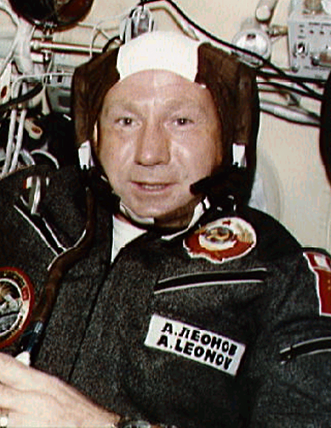
  Alexei Leonov
- Musa Manarov, first to spend over a year in orbit
- Andrian Nikolayev, participant of the first parallel flight, the first to perform spacecraft-to-spacecraft communications, the first to spend two weeks in space
- Valeri Polyakov, performer of the longest continuous spaceflight (437 days)
- Pavel Popovich, participant of the first parallel flight, the first to perform spacecraft-to-spacecraft communications
- Svetlana Savitskaya, second woman to fly into space, the first to perform a spacewalk
- Vitaly Sevastyanov, first to spend two weeks in space
- Anatoly Solovyev, person who made most spacewalks and accumulated most time spacewalking (over 82 hours)
- Valentina Tereshkova, first woman and civilian in space
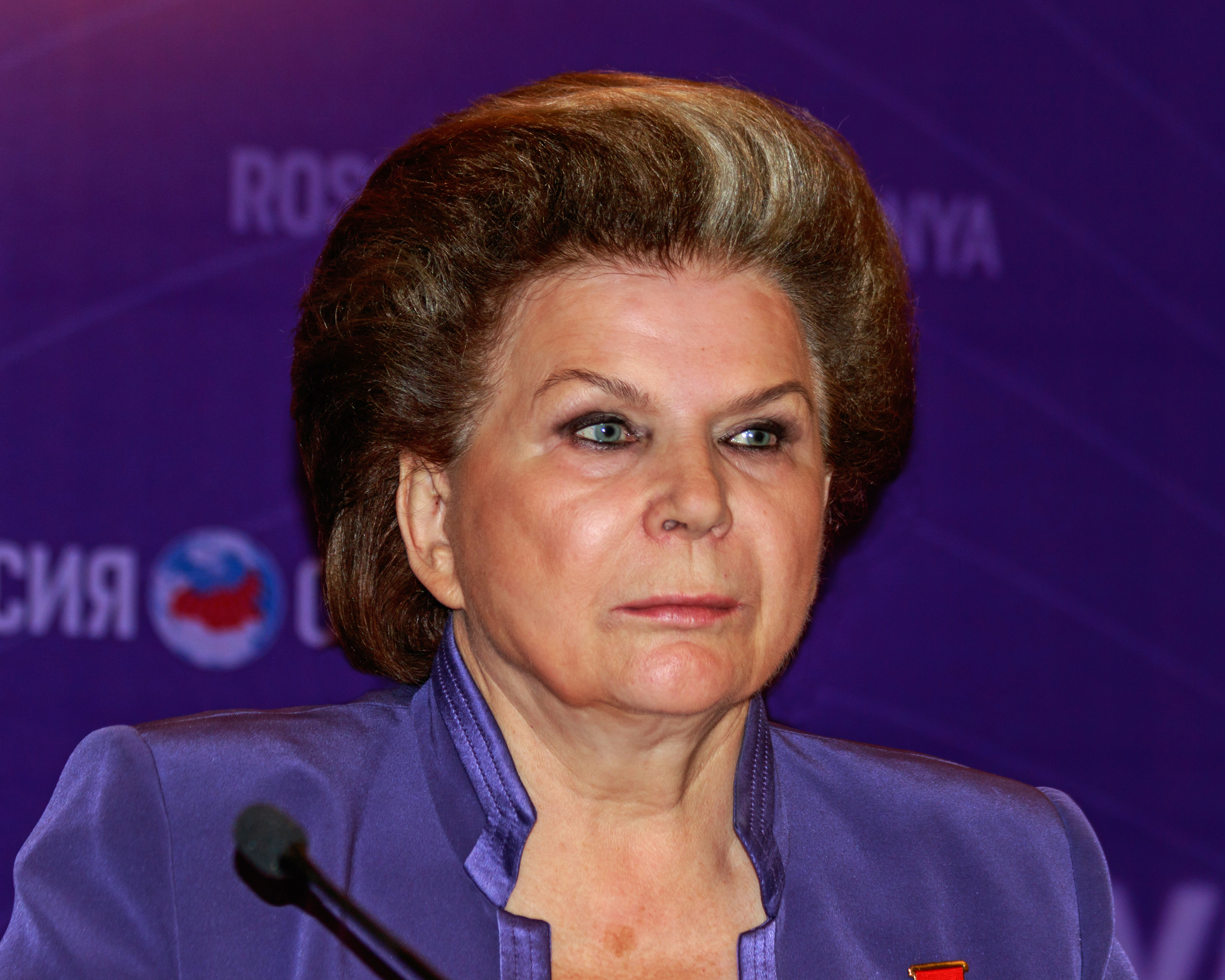
  Valentina Tereshkova
- Gherman Titov, second human to orbit the Earth, the first who spent a whole day and slept in space, the youngest cosmonaut/astronaut so far
- Vladimir Titov, first to spend over a year in orbit
- Boris Yegorov, member of the first three-person space crew, the first physician in space
- Aleksei Yeliseyev, participant of the first dual spacewalk and crew transfer between spacecraft

== Inventors and engineers ==
=== Polymath inventors ===
- Genrich Altshuller, inventor of TRIZ ("The Theory of Solving Inventor's Problems")
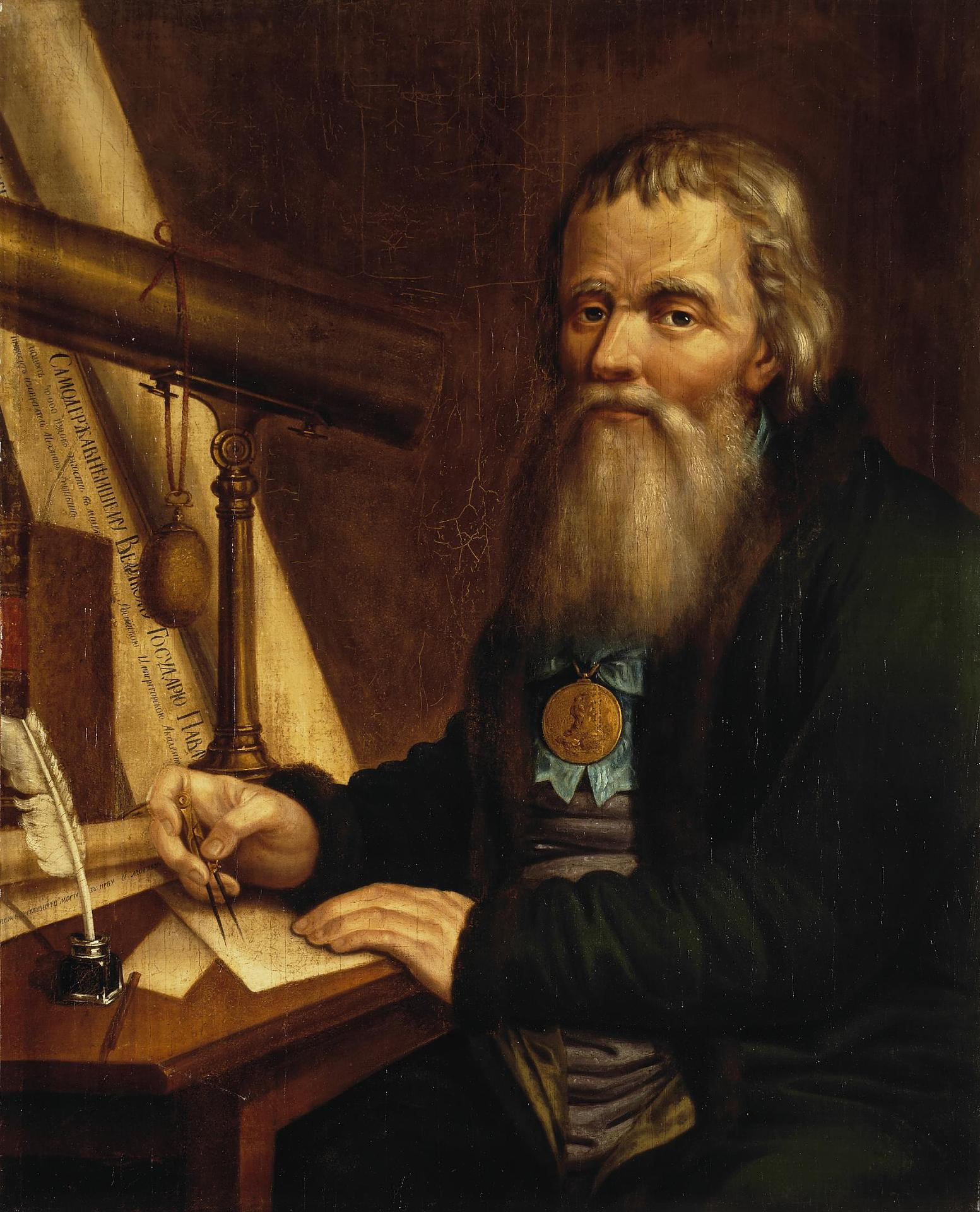
  Ivan Kulibin
- Ivan Kulibin, mechanic and optician, inventor of searchlight, screw-drive elevator, self-rolling carriage (with flywheel, brake, gear box, and bearing), searchlight optical telegraph, mechanic artificial leg
- Mikhail Lomonosov, polymath scientist and artist, inventor of coaxial rotor and the first model helicopter, off-axis reflecting telescope and night vision telescope, co-developed Russian porcelain and re-invented smalt
- Andrey Nartov, inventor of mechanic slide rest, rose engine lathe, quick-firing battery, cannon telescopic sight
- Peter the Great, monarch and craftsman, inventor of decimal currency, yacht club, sounding line with separating plummet, founder of the Russian Navy
  Andrey Nartov
- Vladimir Shukhov, polymath engineer, inventor of thermal cracking, thin-shell structure, tensile structure, hyperboloid structure, gridshell and cylindric oil depot, built Shukhov Towers and created modern theory of pipeline transport
- Leon Theremin, inventor and spy, created theremin, terpsitone, rhythmicon (the first drum machine) and passive resonant cavity bug, introduced interlace technique

=== Weaponry makers ===
- Andrey Chokhov, maker of the Tsar Cannon, the world's largest bombard by caliber
- Vasily Degtyaryov, designer of Degtyaryov-series firearms, inventor of self-loading carbine
- Ivan Fyodorov, 16th-century inventor of multibarreled mortar, introduced printing to Russia
- Vladimir Fyodorov, inventor of assault rifle (Fedorov Avtomat)
- Leonid Gobyato, inventor of modern mortar
- Mikhail Kalashnikov, inventor of AK-47 and AK-74 assault rifles, world's most popular (produced more than all other types of assault rifles combined)
- Yuly Khariton, chief designer of the Soviet atomic bomb, co-developer of the Tsar Bomb
- Sergei Korolyov, inventor of the first intercontinental ballistic missile (R-7 Semyorka)
- Mikhail Koshkin, designer of T-34 medium tank, the best and most produced tank of World War II
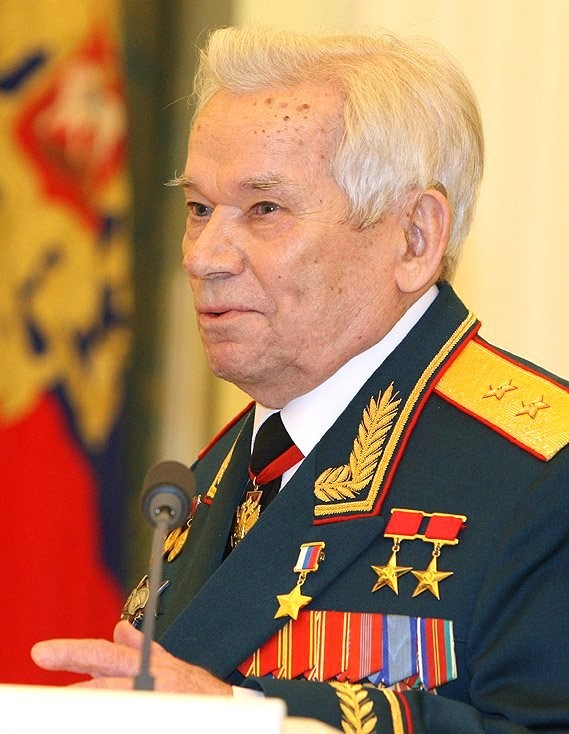
  Mikhail Kalashnikov
- Nikolai Lebedenko, designer of the Tsar Tank, the largest armoured vehicle in history
- Victor Makeyev, developer of the first intercontinental submarine-launched ballistic missile
- Nestor Makhno, anarchist, legendary inventor of tachanka
- Alexander Morozov, designer of T-54/55 (the most produced tank in history)
- Sergey Mosin, inventor of the Mosin–Nagant rifle, one of the most produced in history
- Alexander Nadiradze, inventor of mobile ICBM (RT-21 Temp 2S) and the first reliable mobile ICBM RT-2PM Topol
- Andrey Nartov, polymath inventor, designed quick-firing battery and cannon telescopic sight
- Sergey Nepobedimy, designed the first supersonic anti-tank guided missile Sturm
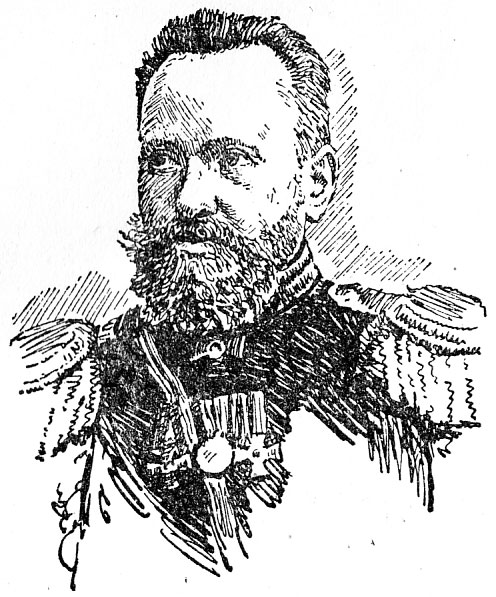
  Sergey Mosin
  and other Soviet rocket weaponry
- Aleksandr Porokhovschikov, inventor of Vezdekhod (the first prototype continuous track tank, or tankette, and the first continuous track amphibious ATV)
- Andrei Sakharov, physicist, inventor of explosively pumped flux compression generator, co-developer of the Tsar Bomb, Nobel Peace Prize winner
- Vladimir Simonov, inventor of underwater assault rifle
- Fedor Tokarev, designer of TT-33 handgun and SVT-40 self-loading rifle, main Soviet guns of WII
- Vladimir Utkin, designer of the railway car-launched ICBM (RT-23 Molodets)
- Ivan Vyrodkov, inventor of siege tower

=== Land transport developers ===
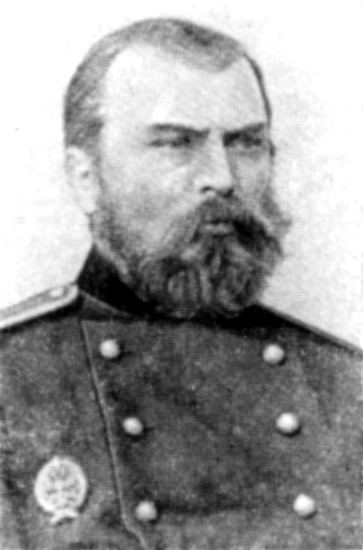
Fyodor Pirotsky

- Fyodor Blinov, inventor of tracked wagon and steam-powered caterpillar tractor
- Cherepanovs, Yefim and his son Miron, makers of the first steam locomotive in Russia
- Ivan Elmanov, inventor of monorail
- Ivan Kulibin, mechanic and optician, inventor of self-rolling carriage (with flywheel, brake, gear box, and bearing)
- Yury Lomonosov, designer of the first successful mainline diesel locomotive
- Pavel Melnikov, Transport Minister, builder of the first Russian Railways, introduced Russian broad gauge
- Fyodor Pirotsky, inventor of railway electrification system and electric tram
- Leonty Shamshurenkov, inventor of the first self-propelling carriage (a precursor to quadrocycle and automobile)
- Pyotr Shilovsky, inventor of gyrocar

=== Naval engineers ===
- Rostislav Alexeyev, designer of high-speed Raketa hydrofoils and ekranoplans, including the Caspian Sea Monster
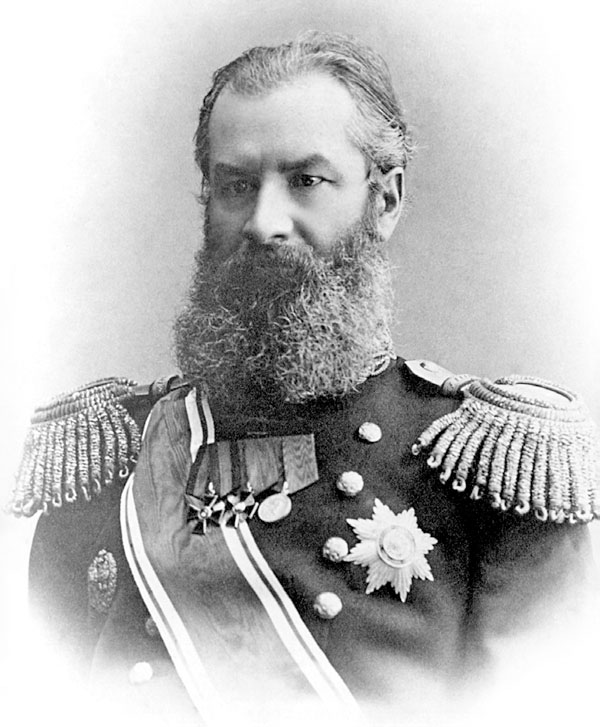
  Alexey Krylov
- Anatoly Alexandrov, inventor of degaussing, developer of naval nuclear reactors (including one for the first nuclear icebreaker)
- Mikhail Britnev, designer of the first metal-hull icebreaker Pilot
- Stefan Drzewiecki, inventor of electric-powered and midget submarines, designed the first serial submarine, developed the blade element theory
- Boris Jacobi, inventor of electric boat, developer of modern naval mining
- Alexei Krylov, inventor of gyroscopic damping of ships, author of the insubmersibility theory
- Fyodor Litke, explorer, inventor of recording tide measurer
- Stepan Makarov, admiral, war hero, oceanographer, inventor of torpedo boat tender, builder of the first polar icebreaker, author of the insubmersibility theory
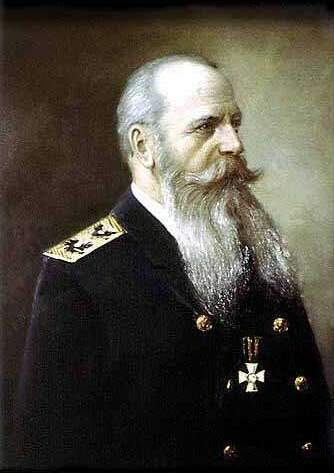
  Stepan Makarov
- Victor Makeyev, developer of the first intercontinental submarine-launched ballistic missile
- Ludvig Nobel, designer of the modern oil tanker
- Pavel Schilling, inventor of electric naval mine
- Igor Spassky, designer of the Sea Launch platform and over 200 nuclear submarines, including the world's largest submarines (Typhoon class)
- Vladimir Yourkevitch, designer of SS Normandie, developer of modern ship hull design

=== Aerospace engineers ===
- Rostislav Alexeyev, designer of high-speed Raketa hydrofoils and ekranoplans, including the Caspian Sea Monster
- Oleg Antonov, designer of the An-series aircraft, including A-40 winged tank and An-124 (the largest serial cargo aircraft, later modified to world's largest fixed-wing aircraft An-225)
- Georgy Babakin, designer of the first soft lander spacecraft Luna 9
- Vladimir Barmin, designer of the first rocket launch complex (Baikonur Cosmodrome)
- Robert Bartini, developer of ekranoplans and VTOL amphibious aircraft, physicist, tutor to many other aerospace designers
- Alexander Bereznyak, designer of the first fighter rocket-powered aircraft, BI-1
- Georgy Beriev, designer of the Be-series amphibious aircraft
- Georgy Bothezat, inventor of the quadrotor helicopter, (The Flying Octopus)
- Vladimir Chelomey, designer of the first space station Salyut 1, creator of Proton rocket (the most used heavy lift launch system)
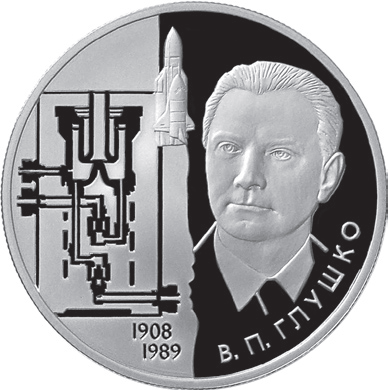
  Valentyn Glushko
- Evgeniy Chertovsky, inventor of pressure suit
- Nicolas Florine, builder of the first successful tandem rotor helicopter
- Valentyn Glushko, inventor of hypergolic propellant and electrically powered spacecraft propulsion, designer of the world's most powerful liquid-fuel rocket engine RD-170
- Pyotr Grushin, inventor of anti-ballistic missile
- Mikhail Gurevich, designer of the MiG-series fighter aircraft, including world's most produced jet aircraft MiG-15 and most produced supersonic aircraft MiG-21
- Sergey Ilyushin, designer of the Il-series fighter aircraft, including Il-2 bomber (the most produced military aircraft in history)
- Aleksei Isaev, designer of the first rocket-powered fighter aircraft, BI-1
- Mstislav Keldysh, co-developer of the first satellite (Sputnik) and Keldysh bomber
- Kerim Kerimov, the secret figure behind the Soviet space program
- Nikolay Kamov, designer of the Ka-series coaxial rotor helicopters
- Alexander Kemurdzhian, inventor of space exploration rover (Lunokhod)
- Nikolai Kibalchich, pioneer of rocketry, author of an early propulsive device design
- Sergei Korolev, the father of the Soviet space program, inventor of the first intercontinental ballistic missile and the first space rocket (R-7 Semyorka), creator of the first satellite (Sputnik), supervisor of the first human spaceflight
- Gleb Kotelnikov, inventor of knapsack parachute and drogue parachute
- Semyon Lavochkin, designer of the La-series aircraft and the first operational surface-to-air missile S-25 Berkut
  Gleb Kotelnikov
- Mikhail Lomonosov, polymath, inventor of coaxial rotor and the first helicopter
- Gleb Lozino-Lozinskiy, designer of the Buran space shuttle and Spiral project
- Arkhip Lyulka, designer of the Lyulka-series aircraft engines, including the first double jet turbofan
- Victor Makeyev, developer of the first intercontinental SLBM
- Artem Mikoyan, designer of the MiG-series fighter aircraft, including world's most produced jet MiG-15 and most produced supersonic aircraft MiG-21
- Mikhail Mil, designer of the Mi-series helicopters, including Mil Mi-8 (the world's most produced helicopter) and Mil Mi-12 (the world's largest helicopter)
- Alexander Mozhaysky, author of the first attempt to create heavier-than-air craft in Russia, designed the largest of 19th-century airplanes
- Alexander Nadiradze, designer of the first mobile ICBM RT-21 Temp 2S and the first reliable mobile ICBM RT-2PM Topol
- Nikolai Polikarpov, designer of the Po-series aircraft, including Po-2 Kukuruznik (world's most produced biplane)
- Mikhail Pogosyan, designer of Sukhoi aircraft, including Su-47, Su-57 and SSJ 100
- Alexander Procofieff de Seversky, inventor of ionocraft and gyroscopically stabilized bombsight
- Guy Severin, designer of the first spacewalk supporting system
- Igor Sikorsky, inventor of airliner and strategic bomber (Sikorsky Ilya Muromets), father of modern helicopter, founder of the Sikorsky Aircraft
- Boris Shavyrin, inventor of air-augmented rocket
- Pavel Sukhoi, designer of the Su-series fighter aircraft
- Vladimir Syromyatnikov, designer of the Androgynous Peripheral Attach System
- Mikhail Tikhonravov, designer of Sputniks, including the first artificial satellite Sputnik 1
- Konstantin Tsiolkovsky, principal pioneer of astronautics
- Alexei Tupolev, designer of the Tu-series aircraft, including the first supersonic transport Tu-144
- Andrei Tupolev, designer of the Tu-series aircraft, including the turboprop long-range airliner Tu-114 and turboprop strategic bomber Tu-95
- Vladimir Vakhmistrov, supervisor of Zveno project (the first bomber with parasite aircraft)
- Alexander Yakovlev, designer of the Yak-series aircraft, including the first regional jet Yak-40
- Friedrich Zander, designer of the first liquid-fuel rocket in the Soviet Union, GIRD-X, pioneer of astronautics
- Nikolai Zhukovsky, founder of modern aero- and hydrodynamics, pioneer of aviation

=== Structural engineers ===
- Nikolai Belelubsky, major bridge designer, invented a number of construction schemes
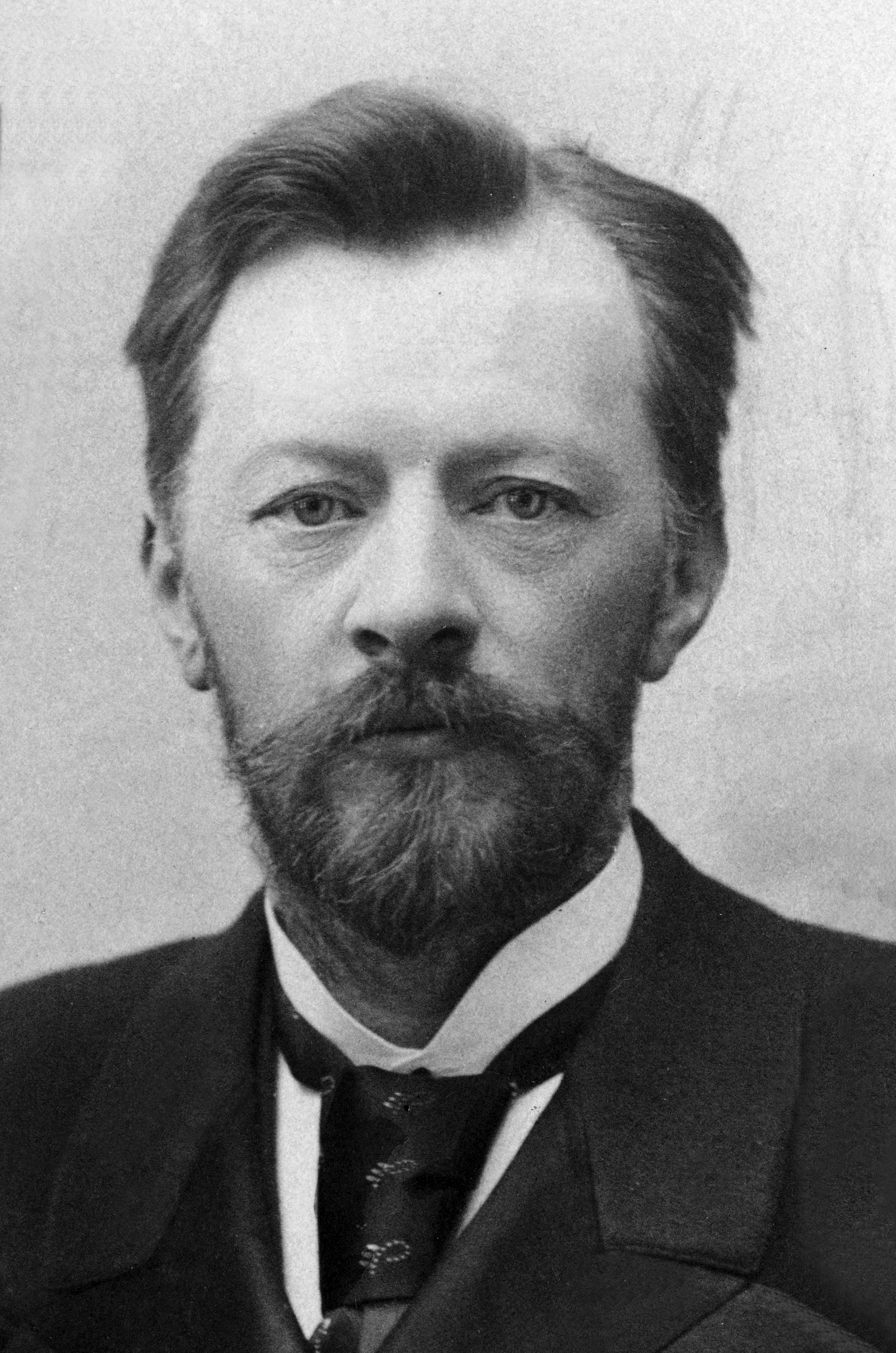
  Vladimir Shukhov
- Agustín de Betancourt, polymath-engineer, urban planner, designed the Moscow Manege and the giant dome of St. Isaac's Cathedral, founded Goznak
- Vladimir Barmin, designer of the world's first rocket launch complex (Baikonur Cosmodrome)
- Akinfiy Demidov, built the Leaning Tower of Nevyansk (the first structure with rebars and cast iron cupola, as well as the first lightning rod in Europe)
- Alexey Dushkin, designer of the first deep column station, Mayakovskaya
- Alexander Hrennikoff, founder of the Finite Element Method
- Nikolai Nikitin, engineer of the largest Soviet structures: Moscow State University, Luzhniki Stadium, The Motherland Calls and Ostankino Tower (once the world's tallest freestanding structure)
- Lavr Proskuryakov, builder of multiple bridges along the Trans-Siberian Railway, inventor and tutor
- Vladimir Shukhov, engineer-polymath, inventor of breakthrough industrial designs (hyperboloid structure, thin-shell structure, tensile structure, gridshell), builder of Shukhov Towers and multiple other structures

=== Electrical engineers ===
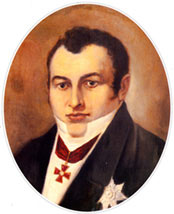
Schilling

- Zhores Alferov, physicist, inventor of heterotransistor, Nobel Prize winner
- Nikolay Benardos, inventor of carbon arc welding (the first practical arc welding method)
- Mikhail Dolivo-Dobrovolsky, inventor of three-phase electric power
- Boris Jacobi, inventor of electroplating, electrotyping, galvanoplastic sculpture and electric boat
- Konstantin Khrenov, inventor of underwater welding
- Alexander Lodygin, one of the inventors of incandescent light bulb, inventor of electric streetlight and tungsten filament
- Oleg Losev, inventor of light-emitting diode and crystadine
- Vasily Petrov, inventor of electric arc and arc welding
- Fyodor Pirotsky, inventor of railway electrification system and electric tram
- Alexander Poniatoff, inventor of videotape recorder
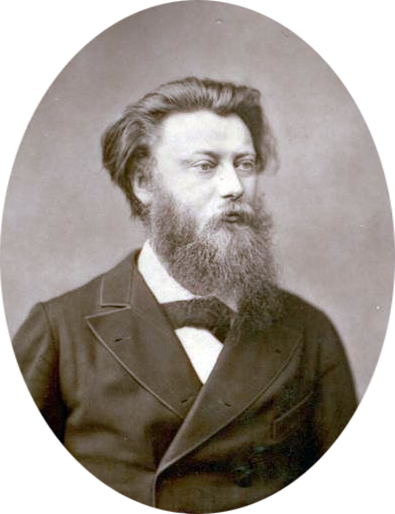
  Pavel Yablochkov
- Georg Wilhelm Richmann, inventor of electrometer, died from ball lightning during an experiment
- Pavel Schilling, inventor of shielded cable, electric mine and electromagnetic telegraph
- Nikolay Slavyanov, inventor of shielded metal arc welding
- Aleksandr Stoletov, physicist, inventor of photoelectric cell
- Pavel Yablochkov, inventor of Yablochkov candle (the first commercially viable electric lamp), transformer and headlamp

=== IT developers ===
- Georgy Adelson-Velsky, inventor of AVL tree algorithm, developer of Kaissa (the first World Computer Chess Champion)
- Boris Babayan, developer of the Elbrus supercomputers
- Sergey Brin, inventor of the Google web search engine
- Nikolay Brusentsov, inventor of ternary computer (Setun)
- Mikhail Donskoy, leading developer of Kaissa, the first computer chess champion
- Victor Glushkov, founder of cybernetics, inventor of the first personal computer MIR
- Anatoly Karatsuba, developed the Karatsuba algorithm (the first fast multiplication algorithm)
- Yevgeny Kaspersky, developer of Kaspersky anti-virus products
- Leonid Khachiyan, developed the Ellipsoid algorithm for linear programming
- Semen Korsakov, first to use punched cards for information storage and search
- Evgeny Landis, inventor of AVL tree algorithm
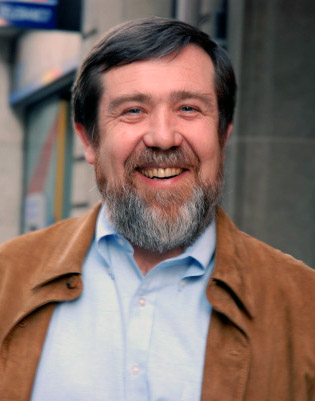
  Alexey Pajitnov
- Sergey Lebedev, developer of the first Soviet and European electronic computers, MESM and BESM
- Vladimir Levenshtein, developed the Levenshtein automaton, Levenshtein coding and Levenshtein distance
- Willgodt Theophil Odhner, inventor of the Odhner Arithmometer, the most popular mechanical calculator in the 20th century
- Alexey Pajitnov, inventor of Tetris
- Eugene Roshal, developer of the FAR file manager, RAR file format, WinRAR file archiver
- Valentin Turchin, inventor of Refal programming language, introduced metasystem transition and supercompilation

=== Optics and photography pioneers ===
- Franz Aepinus, inventor of achromatic microscope
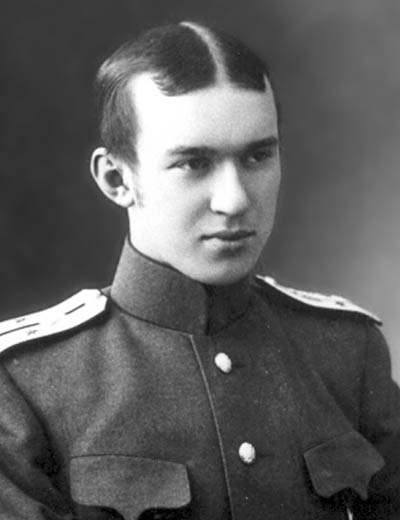
  Dmitry Maksutov
- Nikolay Basov, physicist, co-inventor of laser and maser, Nobel Prize winner
- Yuri Denisyuk, inventor of 3D holography
- Semyon Kirlian, inventor of Kirlian photography
- Ivan Kulibin, polymath inventor, introduced candle searchlight and searchlight-based optical telegraph
- Sergey Levitsky, inventor of the bellows camera, one of the earliest photography pioneers
- Mikhail Lomonosov, polymath scientist and artist, inventor of off-axis reflecting telescope and night vision telescope
- Alexander Makarov, inventor of orbitrap
- Dmitry Maksutov, inventor of the Maksutov telescope
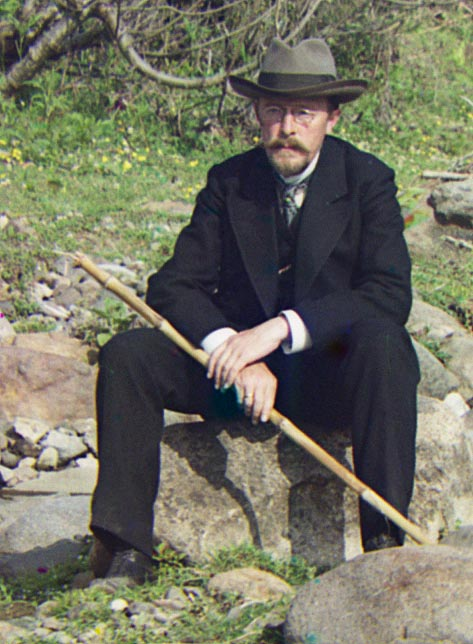
  Sergey Prokudin-Gorsky
- Boris Mamyrin, inventor of reflectron
- Alexander Prokhorov, physicist, co-inventor of laser and maser, Nobel Prize winner
- Sergey Prokudin-Gorsky, pioneer of colour photography, inventor of colour film slides and colour motion pictures, famous for his multiple colour photos of Russian Empire
- Yevgeny Zavoisky, inventor of EPR spectroscopy, co-developer of NMR spectroscopy

=== Communication engineers ===
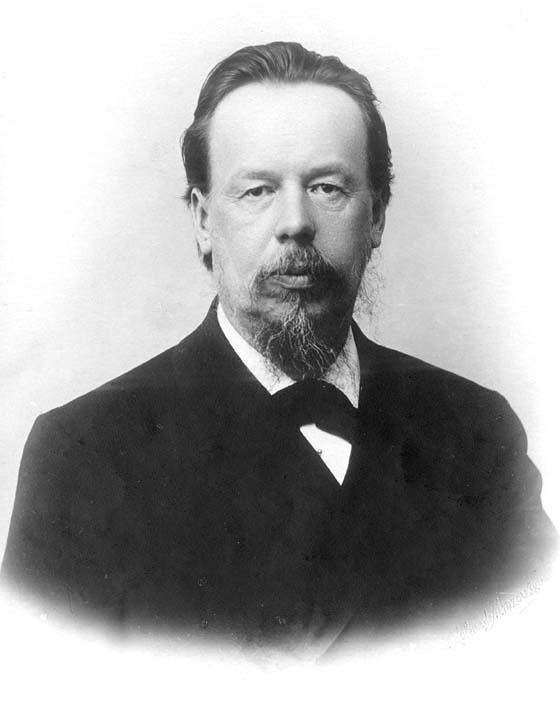
Alexander Popov

- Hovannes Adamian, inventor of the first RGB-based mechanical colour TV system
- Leonid Kupriyanovich, inventor of man-portable mobile phone and pocket mobile phone
- Oleg Losev, inventor of crystadine radio
- Constantin Perskyi, inventor of the word "television", TV pioneer
- Alexander Popov, inventor of lightning detector, one of the inventors of radio
- Boris Rosing, the first to use cathode-ray tube in a TV system
- Pavel Schilling, inventor of electric telegraph
- Leon Theremin, polymath, inventor of interlace
- Vladimir Zworykin, "the father of television", inventor of iconoscope and kinescope

=== Musical instrument makers ===
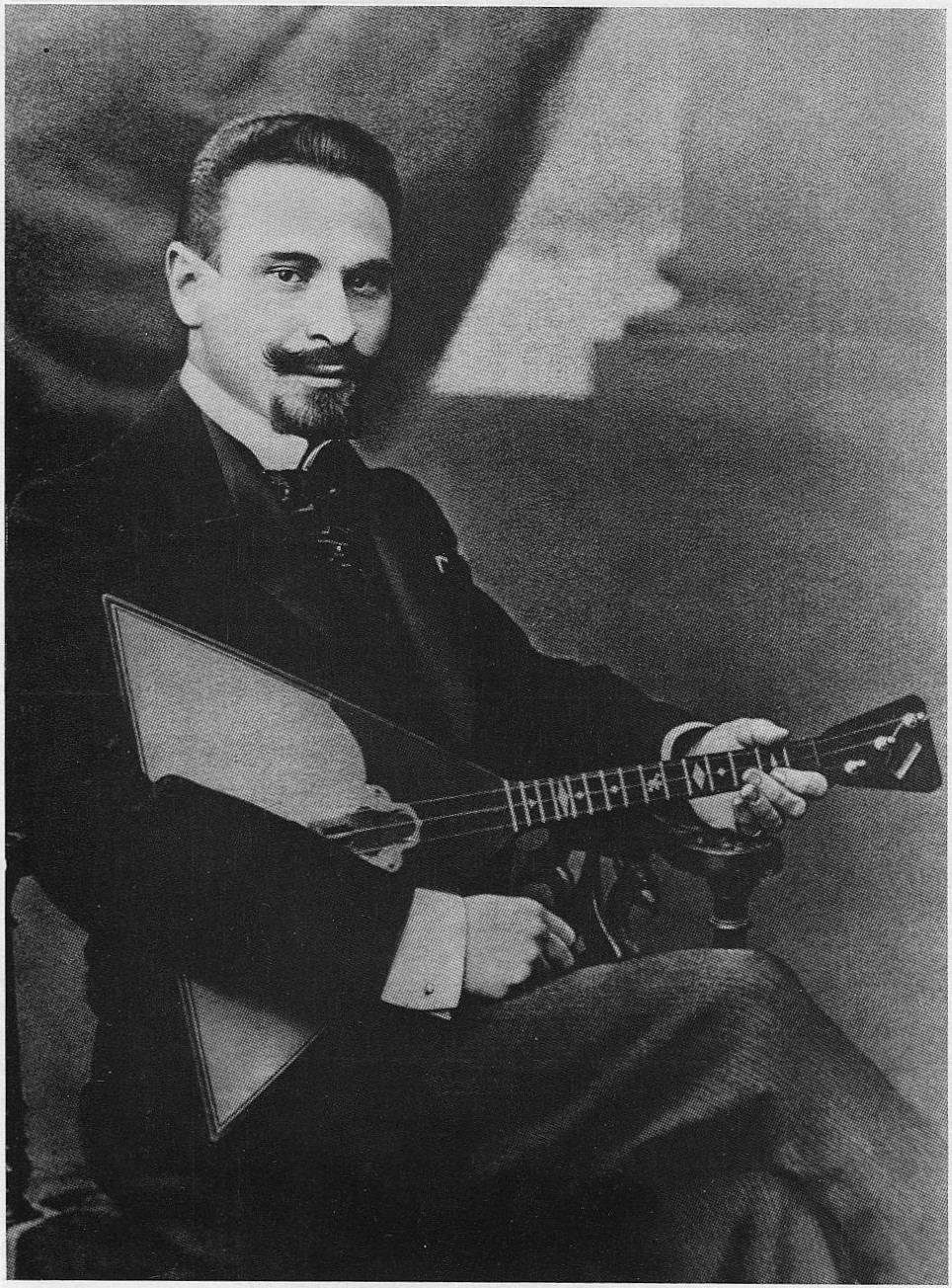
Vasily Andreyev

- Vasily Andreyev, developed the standard balalaika, revived domra and gusli
- Vladimir Baranov-Rossine, inventor of Optophonic Piano
- Motorins, Ivan his son Mikhail, makers of the Tsar Bell, the largest bell in the world
- Yevgeny Murzin, inventor of the ANS synthesizer
- Andrei Sychra, inventor of the Russian guitar
- Leon Theremin, inventor of theremin (the first successful electronic musical instrument), terpsitone and rhythmicon (the first drum machine)

=== Miscellaneous inventors ===
- Vitaly Abalakov, mountaineer, inventor of the camming devices and V-thread
  Sergey Malyutin'
- Alexandre Alexeieff, inventor of pinscreen animation
- Anatoly Kharlampiev, developer of sambo martial art
- Yuri Leonidovich Belousov, researcher and engineer
- Lisitsyns family, producers of the first Russian samovars
- Sergey Malyutin, painter, inventor of matryoshka doll
- Vera Mukhina, sculptor, inventor of welded sculpture
- Lucien Olivier, inventor of Salad Olivier
- Ivan Polzunov, inventor of the two-cylinder steam engine

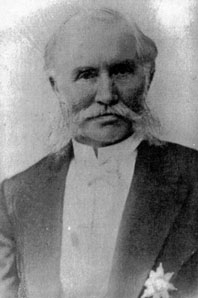
Franz San Galli

- Ida Rosenthal, inventor of modern bra, the standard of cup sizes and nursing bra
- Alexander Sablukov, inventor of centrifugal fan
- Franz San Galli, inventor of radiator
- Yefim Smolin, inventor of table-glass
- Viktor Vasnetsov, inventor of budenovka
- Ludwik Zamenhof, inventor of Esperanto

== Scientists and scholars ==
=== Polymaths ===
- Alexander Borodin, chemist and composer, author of the famous opera Prince Igor, discovered Borodin reaction, co-discovered Aldol reaction
- Alexander Chizhevsky, interdisciplinary scientist, biophysicist, philosopher and artist, founder of heliobiology and modern air ionification, Russian cosmist
- Mikhail Lomonosov, polymath scientist, artist and inventor; founder of the Moscow State University; proposed the law of conservation of matter; disproved the phlogiston theory; invented coaxial rotor and the first helicopter;
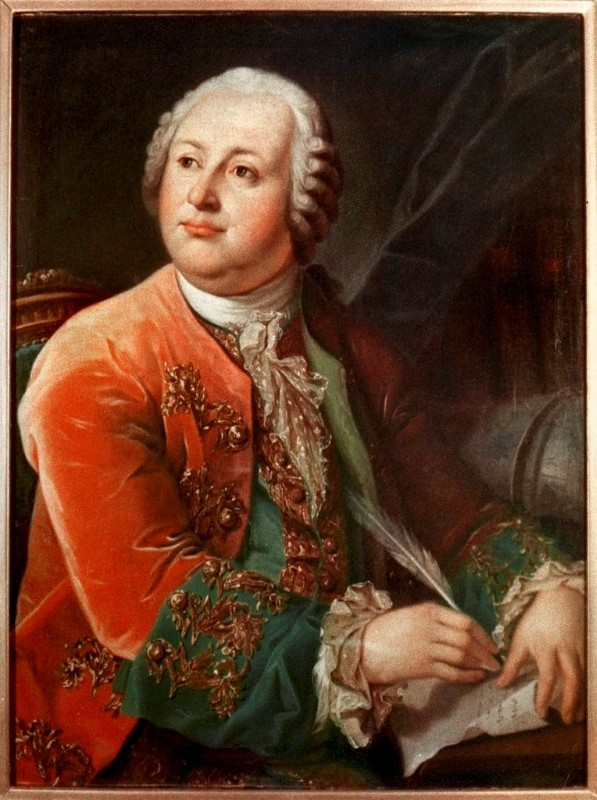
  Mikhail Lomonosov
  invented the night vision telescope and off-axis reflecting telescope; discovered the atmosphere of Venus; suggested the organic origin of soil, peat, coal, petroleum and amber; pioneered the research of atmospheric electricity; coined the term physical chemistry; the first to record freezing of mercury; co-developed the Russian porcelain, re-discovered smalt and created a number of mosaics dedicated to Petrine era; author of an early account of Russian history and the first opponent of the Normanist theory; reformed Russian literary language by combining Old Church Slavonic with vernacular tongue in his early grammar; influenced Russian poetry through his odes
- Vladimir Obruchev, geologist, paleontologist, geographer and explorer of Siberia and Central Asia, author of the comprehensive Geology of Siberia and two popular science fiction novels, Plutonia and Sannikov Land
- Peter Simon Pallas, polymath naturalist, geographer, ethnographer, philologist, explorer of European Russia and Siberia, discoverer of the first pallasite meteorite (Krasnojarsk meteorite) and multiple animals, including the Pallas's cat, Pallas's squirrel, and Pallas's gull
- Yakov Perelman, a founder of popular science, author of many popular books, including the Physics Can Be Fun and Mathematics Can Be Fun
- Pyotr Semyonov-Tyan-Shansky, geographer, geologist, entomologist, explorer of the Tian Shan Mountains, discoverer of the Peak Khan Tengri, for 40 years the head of the Russian Geographical Society, statistician, organiser of the first Russian Empire Census
- Vasily Tatishchev, statesman, economist, geographer, ethnographer, philologist and historian, supervisor of the first instrumental mapping of Russia, coloniser of the Urals and Siberia, founder of Perm and Yekaterinburg, discovered and published Russkaya Pravda, Sudebnik and the controversial Ioachim Chronicle, wrote the first full-scale account of Russian history, compiled the first encyclopedic dictionary of Russian language
- Vladimir Vernadsky, philosopher, geologist, a founder of geochemistry, biogeochemistry and radiogeology, creator of noosphere theory, popularized the term biosphere, major Russian cosmist
- Ivan Yefremov, paleontologist, philosopher, sci-fi and historical novelist, founder of taphonomy, author of The Land of Foam, Andromeda: A Space-Age Tale and Thais of Athens

=== Earth scientists ===
- Maukhida Abdulkabirova, geologist and metallurgist
- Karl Baer, naturalist, formulated the geological Baer's law on river erosion
- Ivan Chersky, geologist, explorer of Siberia, explained the origin of Lake Baikal, pioneered the geomorphological evolution theory
- Alexander Fersman, a founder of geochemistry, discovered copper in Monchegorsk, apatites in Khibiny, sulfur in Central Asia
- Boris Golitsyn, inventor of electromagnetic seismograph, the President of International Association of Seismology
- Ivan Gubkin, founder of the Gubkin Russian State University of Oil and Gas
- Alexander Karpinsky, geologist and mineralogist, the first President of the Soviet Academy of Sciences
- Vladimir Köppen, meteorologist, author of the commonly used Köppen climate classification
- Stepan Krasheninnikov, geographer, the first Russian naturalist, made the first scientific description of Kamchatka
- Pyotr Shirshov, polar explorer, founder of the Shirshov Institute of Oceanology, proved that there is life in high latitudes of the Arctic Ocean
- Yuly Shokalsky, first head of the Soviet Geographical Society, coined the term World Ocean
- Vladimir Vernadsky, philosopher, geologist, a founder of geochemistry, biogeochemistry and radiogeology, creator of noosphere theory, popularized the term biosphere

=== Biologists and paleontologists ===
- Johann Friedrich Adam, discovered the Adams mammoth, the first complete woolly mammoth skeleton
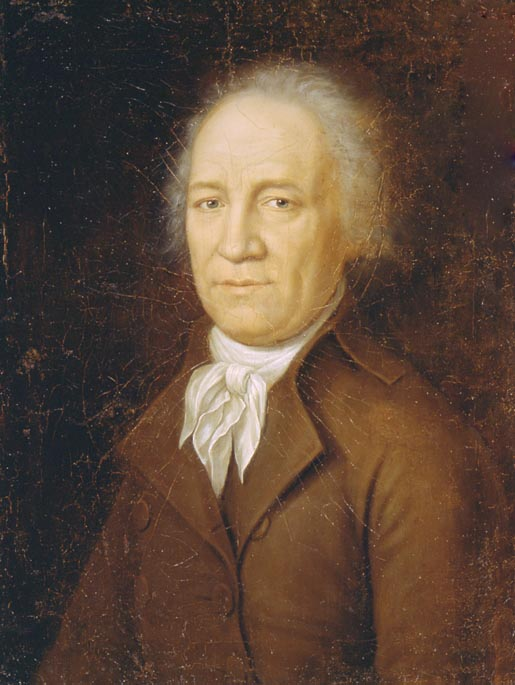
  Andrey Bolotov
- Karl Baer, naturalist, founded the Russian Entomological Society, formulated embryological Baer's laws
- Nikolai Bernstein, neurophysiologist, coined the term "biomechanics"
- Andrey Bolotov, major 18th-century agriculturist, discovered dichogamy, pioneered cross-pollination
- Alexander Chizhevsky, founder of heliobiology and modern air ionification
- Andrey Famintsyn, plant physiologist, inventor of grow lamp, developer of symbiogenesis theory
- Yuri Filipchenko, entomologist, coined the terms microevolution and macroevolution
- Johann Georg Gmelin, the first researcher of Siberian flora
  Dmitry Ivanovsky
- Alexander Gurwitsch, originated the morphogenetic field theory and discovered the biophoton
- Ilya Ivanov, researcher of artificial insemination and the interspecific hybridization of animals, attempted to create a human-ape hybrid
- Dmitry Ivanovsky, discoverer of viruses
- Georgii Karpechenko, inventor of rabbage (the first ever non-sterile hybrid obtained through crossbreeding)
- Nikolai Koltsov, discoverer of cytoskeleton
- Vladimir Komarov, plant geographer, President of the Soviet Academy of Sciences, founder of the Komarov Botanical Institute
- Ilya Mechnikov, pioneer researcher of immune system, probiotics and phagocytosis, coined the term gerontology, Nobel Prize in Medicine winner
- Konstantin Merezhkovsky, major lichenologist, developer of symbiogenesis theory, a founder of endosymbiosis theory
- Ivan Michurin, pomologist, selectionist and geneticist, practiced crossing of geographically distant plants, created hundreds of fruit cultivars
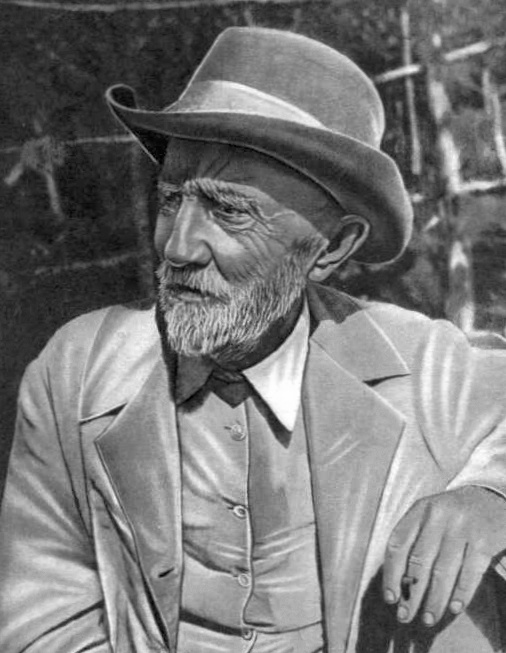
  Ivan Michurin
- Alexander Middendorf, zoologist and explorer, studied the influence of permafrost on living beings, coined the term radula, prominent horse breeder
- Victor Motschulsky, prominent researcher of beetles
- Sergei Navashin, discovered double fertilization
- Alexey Olovnikov, predicted existence of Telomerase, suggested the Telomere hypothesis of aging and the Telomere relations to cancer
- Aleksandr Oparin, biologist and biochemist, proposed the "Primordial soup" theory of life origin, showed that many food production processes are based on biocatalysis
- Heinz Christian Pander, embryologist, discovered germ layers
- Peter Simon Pallas, polymath naturalist, explorer, discoverer of multiple animals, including the Pallas's cat, Pallas's squirrel, and Pallas's gull
- Ivan Pavlov, founder of modern physiology, the first to research classical conditioning, Nobel Prize in Medicine winner
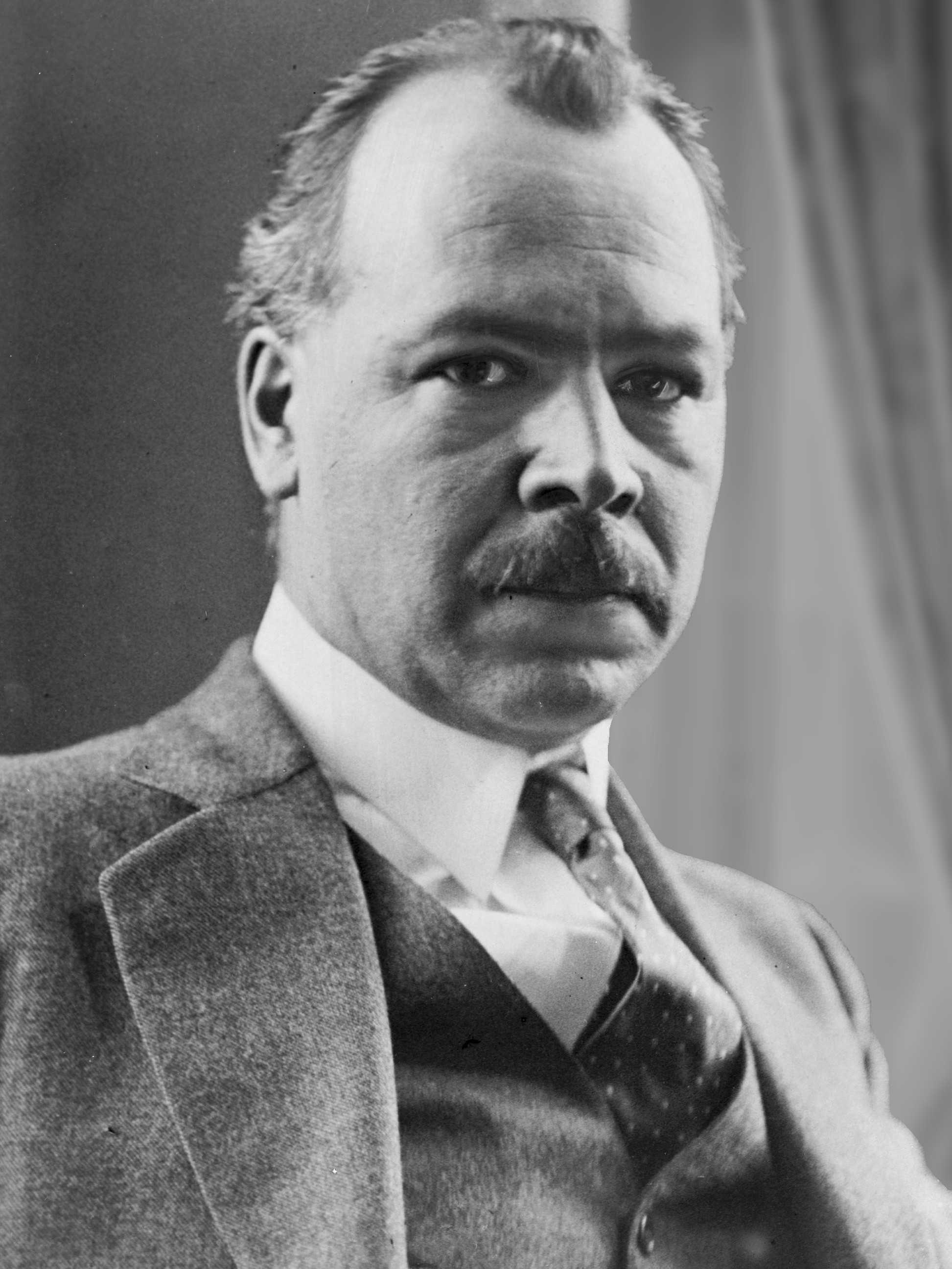
  Nikolai Vavilov
- Vladimir Pravdich-Neminsky, published the first EEG and the evoked potential of the mammalian brain
- Carl Schmidt, researcher of biochemical crystal structures, proved the chemical similarity of animal and plant cells
- Boris Schwanwitsch, entomologist, applied colour patterns of insect wings to military camouflage during World War II
- Ivan Sechenov, founder of electrophysiology and neurophysiology
- Georg Wilhelm Steller, naturalist, participant of Vitus Bering's voyages, discoverer of Steller's jay, Steller's eider, extinct Steller's sea cow and multiple other animals
- Lina Stern, pioneer researcher of blood–brain barrier
- Armen Takhtajan, developer of Takhtajan system of flowering plant classification, major biogeographer
- Kliment Timiryazev, plant physiologist and evolutionist, major researcher of chlorophyll
  Sergey Vinogradsky
- Lev Tsenkovsky, pioneer researcher of the ontogenesis of lower plants and animals
- Mikhail Tsvet, inventor of chromatography
- Nikolai Vavilov, botanist and geneticist, gathered the world's largest collection of plant seeds, identified the centres of origin of main cultivated plants
- Sergey Vinogradsky, microbiologist, ecologist and soil scientist, pioneered the biogeochemical cycle concept, discovered lithotrophy and chemosynthesis, invented the Winogradsky column for breeding of microorganisms
- Ivan Yefremov, paleontologist, sci-fi author, founded taphonomy
- Sergey Zimov, creator of the Pleistocene Park

=== Physicians and psychologists ===
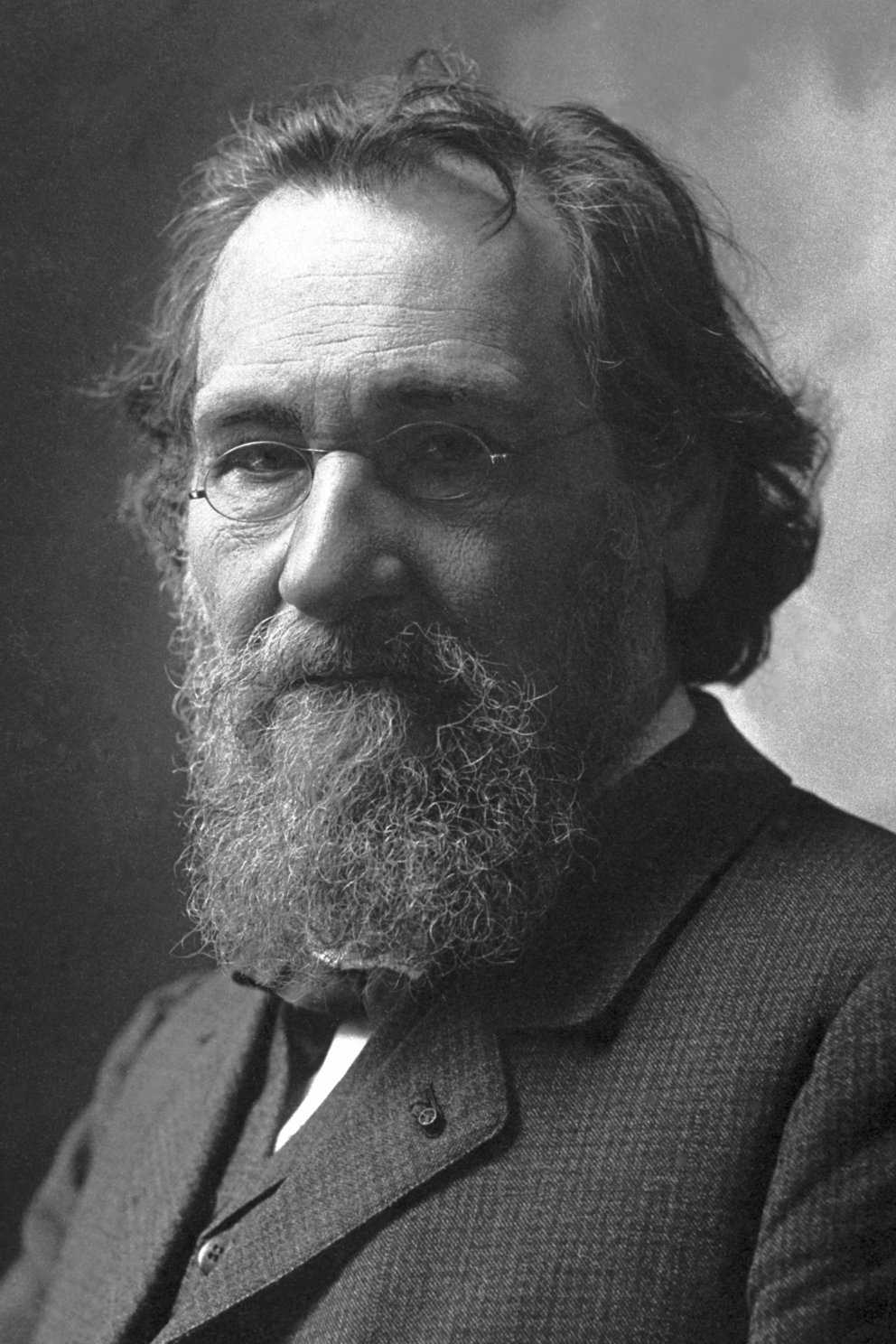
Ilya Mechnikov

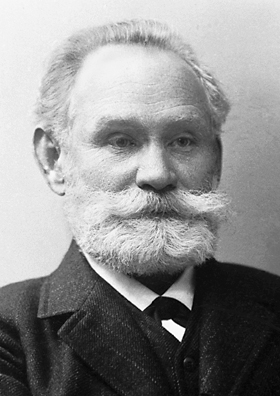
Ivan Pavlov

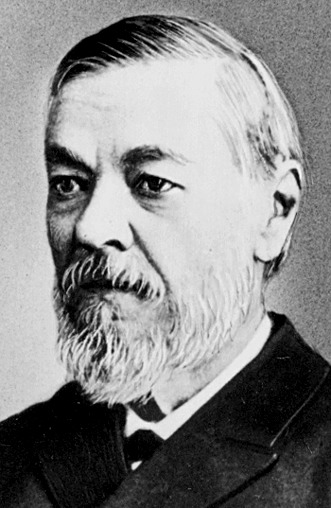
Ivan Sechenov

- Vladimir Bekhterev, neuropathologist, founder of objective psychology, noted the role of the hippocampus in memory, a developer of reflexology, studied the Bekhterev's Disease
- Vladimir Betz, discovered Betz cells of primary motor cortex
- Sergey Botkin, major therapist and court physician
- Nikolay Burdenko, major developer of neurosurgery
- Konstantin Buteyko, developed the Buteyko method for the treatment of breathing disorders
- Vladimir Demikhov, major pioneer of transplantology
- Vladimir Filatov, ophthalmologist, corneal transplantation pioneer
- Svyatoslav Fyodorov, inventor of radial keratotomy
- Georgy Gause, inventor of gramicidin S and other antibiotics
- Oleg Gazenko, founder of space medicine; selected and trained Laika, the first space dog
- Vera Gedroitz, first female Professor of Surgery in the world
- Waldemar Haffkine, invented the first vaccines against cholera and bubonic plague
- Gavriil Ilizarov, invented Ilizarov apparatus, developed distraction osteogenesis
- Nikolai Korotkov, invented auscultatory blood pressure measurement, pioneered vascular surgery
- Sergey Korsakov, studied the effects of alcoholism on the nervous system, described Korsakoff's syndrome, introduced paranoia concept
- Aleksey Leontyev, founder of activity theory in psychology
- Peter Lesgaft, founder of the modern system of physical education in Russia
- Alexander Luria, co-developer of activity theory and cultural-historical psychology, major researcher of aphasia
- Ilya Mechnikov, pioneer researcher of immune system, probiotics and phagocytosis; coined the term gerontology, Nobel Prize in Medicine winner
- Pyotr Nikolsky, dermatologist, discoverer of Nikolsky's sign
- Alexey Olovnikov, predicted existence of Telomerase, suggested the Telomere hypothesis of aging and the Telomere relations to cancer
- Ivan Pavlov, founder of modern physiology, the first to research classical conditioning, Nobel Prize in Medicine winner
- Nikolay Pirogov, pioneer of ether anaesthesia and modern field surgery, the first to perform anaesthesia in the field conditions, invented a number of surgical operations
- Leonid Rogozov, performed an appendectomy on himself during the sixth Soviet Antarctic Expedition, a famous case of self-surgery
- Grigory Rossolimo, pioneer of child neuropsychology
- Galina Savelyeva, gynaecologist
- Ivan Sechenov, founder of electrophysiology and neurophysiology, author of the classic work Reflexes of the Brain
- Victor Skumin, described Skumin syndrome
- Lina Stern, pioneer researcher of blood–brain barrier
- Fyodor Uglov, oldest practicing surgeon in history
- Alexander Varshavsky, researched ubiquitination, Wolf Prize in Medicine winner
- Luka Voyno-Yasenetsky, founder of purulent surgery, saint
- Lev Vygotsky, founder of cultural-historical psychology, major contributor to child development and psycholinguistics, introduced zone of proximal development and cultural mediation concepts
- Josias Weitbrecht, first to describe the construction and function of intervertebral discs
- Sergei Yudin, inventor of cadaveric blood transfusion
- Bluma Zeigarnik, psychiatrist, discovered the Zeigarnik effect, founded experimental psychopathology

=== Economists and sociologists ===
- Alexander Chayanov, developed the consumption-labour-balance principle
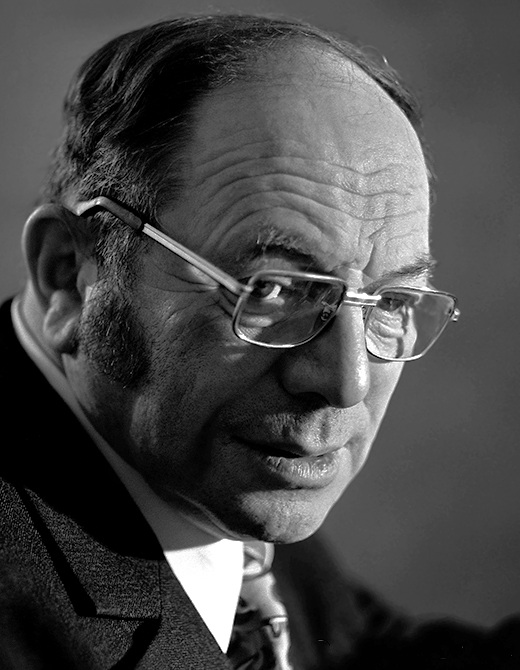
  Leonid Kantorovich
- Georges Gurvitch, major developer of sociology of knowledge and sociology of law
- Leonid Kantorovich, mathematician and economist, founded linear programming, developed the theory of optimal allocation of resources, Nobel Prize in Economics winner
- Nikolai Kondratiev, discoverer of the Kondratiev waves
- Andrey Korotayev, historian, anthropologist, a founder of cliodynamics, prominent developer of social cycle theory
- Gleb Krzhizhanovsky, developer of the GOELRO plan, the first Chief of Gosplan
- Simon Kuznets, discovered the Kuznets swings, built the Kuznets curve, disproved the Absolute Income Hypothesis, Nobel Prize in Economics winner
- Vladimir Lenin, leader of the October Revolution and founder of the Soviet Union, introduced planned economy and Leninism
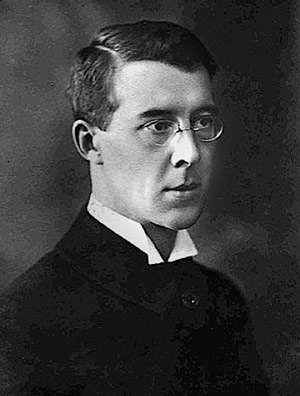
  Pitirim Sorokin
- Evsei Liberman, laid the scientific support for the Soviet Kosygin reform in economy
- Wassily Leontief, developed input-output analysis and the Leontief paradox, Nobel Prize in Economics winner
- Vasily Nemchinov, created the mathematical basis for the Soviet central planning
- Grigory Orlov, founder of the Free Economic Society
- Pitirim Sorokin, sociologist, a prominent developer of the social cycle theory
- Stanislav Strumilin, pioneer of the planned economy, developed the first five-year plans

=== Historians and archaeologists ===
- Mikhail Artamonov, historian and archaeologist,
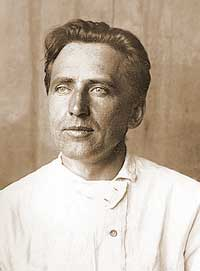
  Mikhail Artamonov
  founder of modern Khazar studies, excavated a great number of Scythian and Khazar kurgans and settlements, including Sarkel
- Artemiy Artsikhovsky, archaeologist, discoverer of birch bark documents in Novgorod
- Vasily Bartold, turkologist, the "Gibbon of Turkestan", archaeologist of Samarcand
- Konstantin Bestuzhev-Ryumin, 19th-century historian and paleographer, founder of the Bestuzhev Courses for women
- Nikita Bichurin, a founder of Sinology, published many documents on Chinese and Mongolian history, opened the first Chinese-language school in Russia
- Nikolay Danilevsky, ethnologist, philosopher and historian, a founder of Eurasianism, the first to present an account of history as a series of distinct civilisations
- Igor Diakonov, historian and linguist, a prominent researcher of Sumer and Assyria
- Boris Farmakovsky, archaeologist of Ancient Greek colony Olbia
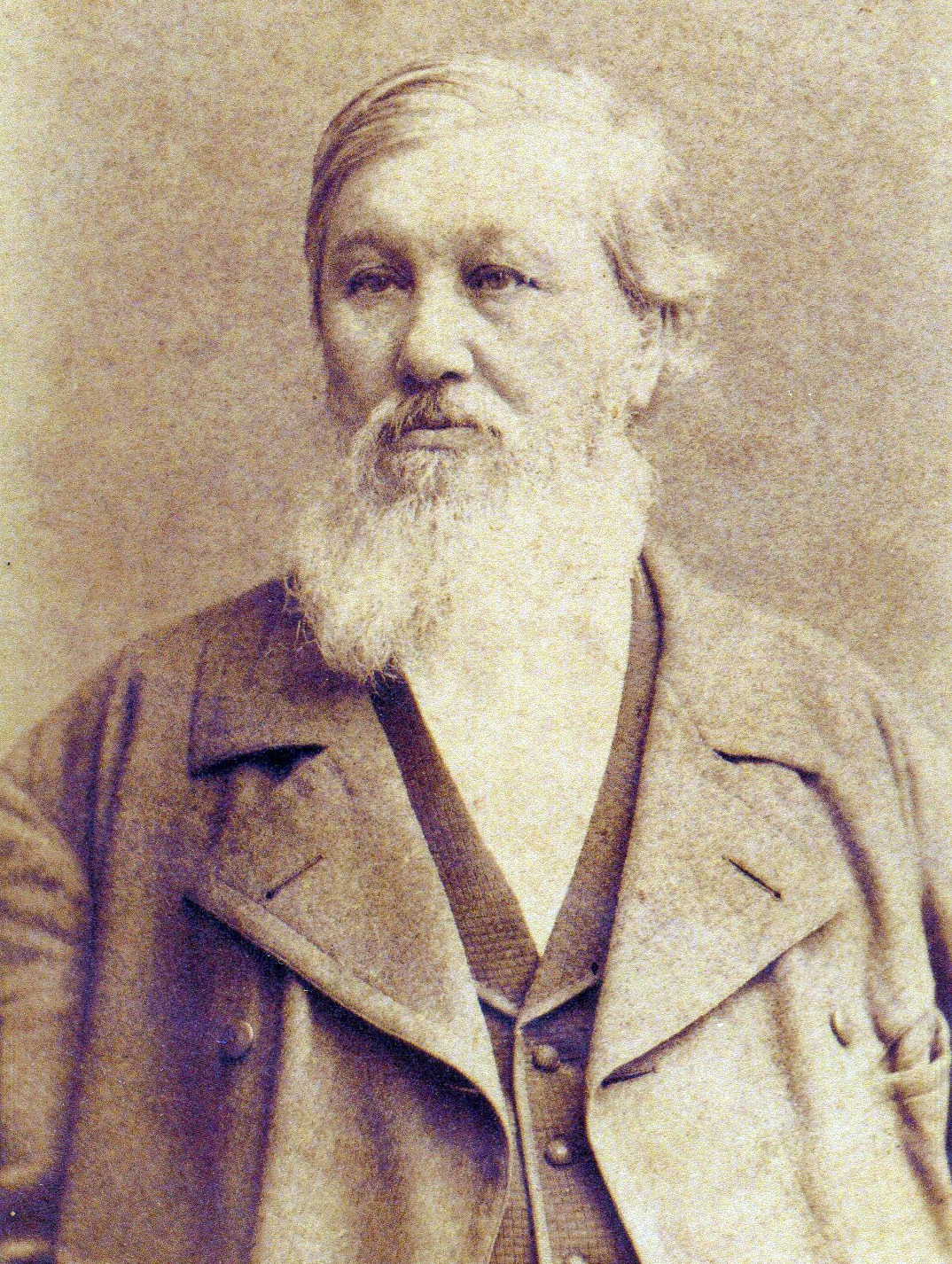
  Nikolay Danilevsky
- Vladimir Golenishchev, egyptologist, excavated Wadi Hammamat, discovered over 6,000 antiquities, including the Moscow Mathematical Papyrus, the Story of Wenamun, and various Fayum portraits
- Timofey Granovsky, a founder of mediaeval studies in Russia, disproved the historicity of Vineta
- Boris Grekov, major researcher of Kievan Rus' and the Golden Horde
- Lev Gumilev, historian and ethnologist, prominent researcher of the ancient Central Asian peoples, related ethnogenesis and biosphere, influenced the rise of Neo-Eurasianism
- Boris Hessen, physicist who brought externalism into modern historiography of science
- Pyotr Kafarov, prominent sinologist, discovered The Secret History of the Mongols
- Nikolai Karamzin, sentimentalist writer and historian, author of the 12-volume History of the Russian State
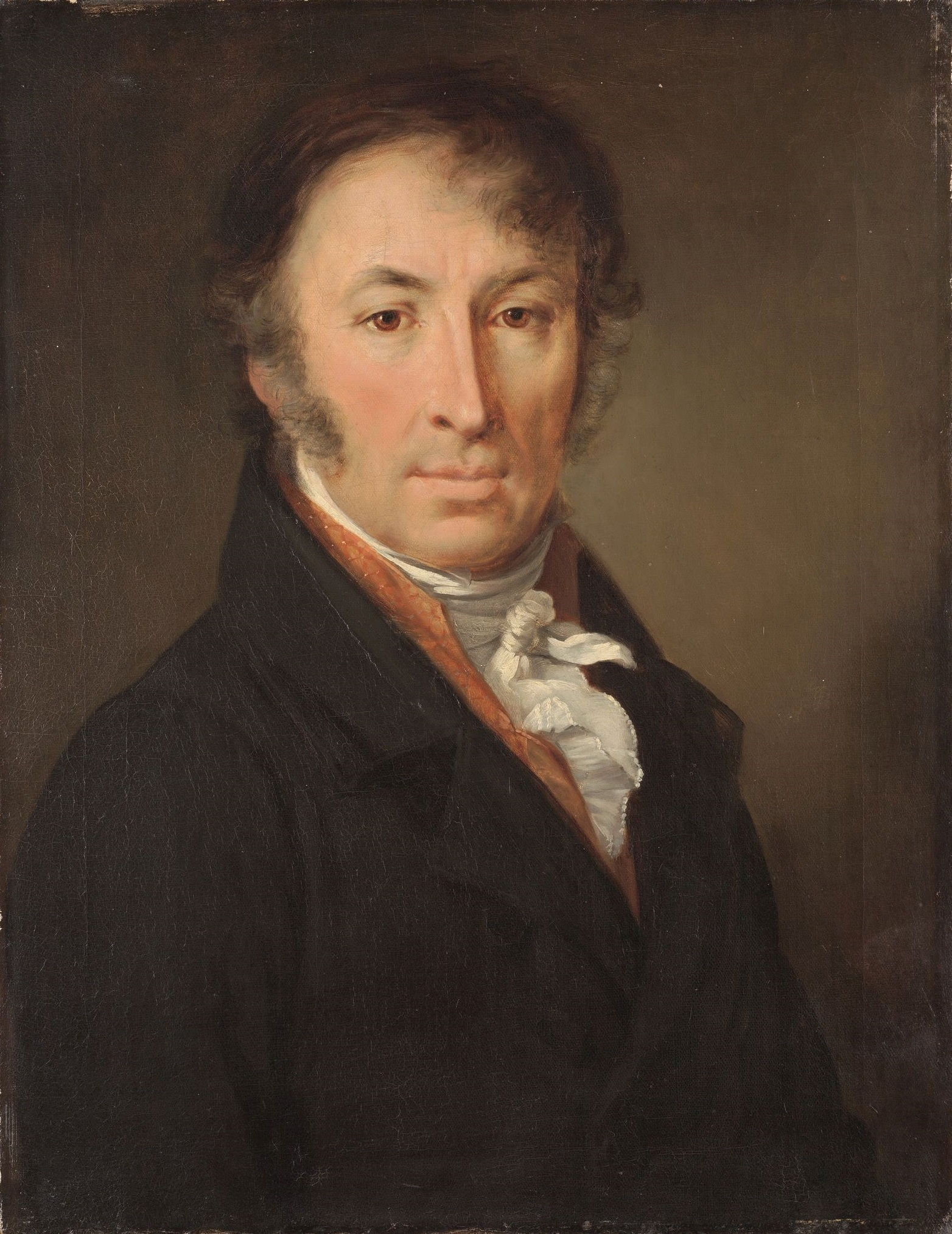
  Nikolai Karamzin
- Vasily Klyuchevsky, dominated Russian historiography at the turn of the 20th century, shifted focus from politics and society to geography and economy
- Alexander Kazhdan, Byzantinist, editor of the Oxford Dictionary of Byzantium
- Nikodim Kondakov, prominent researcher of Byzantine art
- Andrey Korotayev, historian and anthropologist, a founder of cliodynamics, prominent developer of social cycle theory
- Pyotr Kozlov, explorer of Central Asia, discoverer of the ancient Tangut city of Khara-Khoto and Xiongnu royal burials at Noin-Ula
- Nikolay Likhachyov, first and foremost Russian sigillographer, major developer of auxiliary historical disciplines
- Aleksey Lobanov-Rostovsky, statesman, published the major Russian Genealogical Book
- Mikhail Lomonosov, polymath scientist and artist, the first opponent of the Normanist theory, published an early account of Russian history
- Friedrich Martens, legal historian, drafted the Martens Clause of the Hague Peace Conference
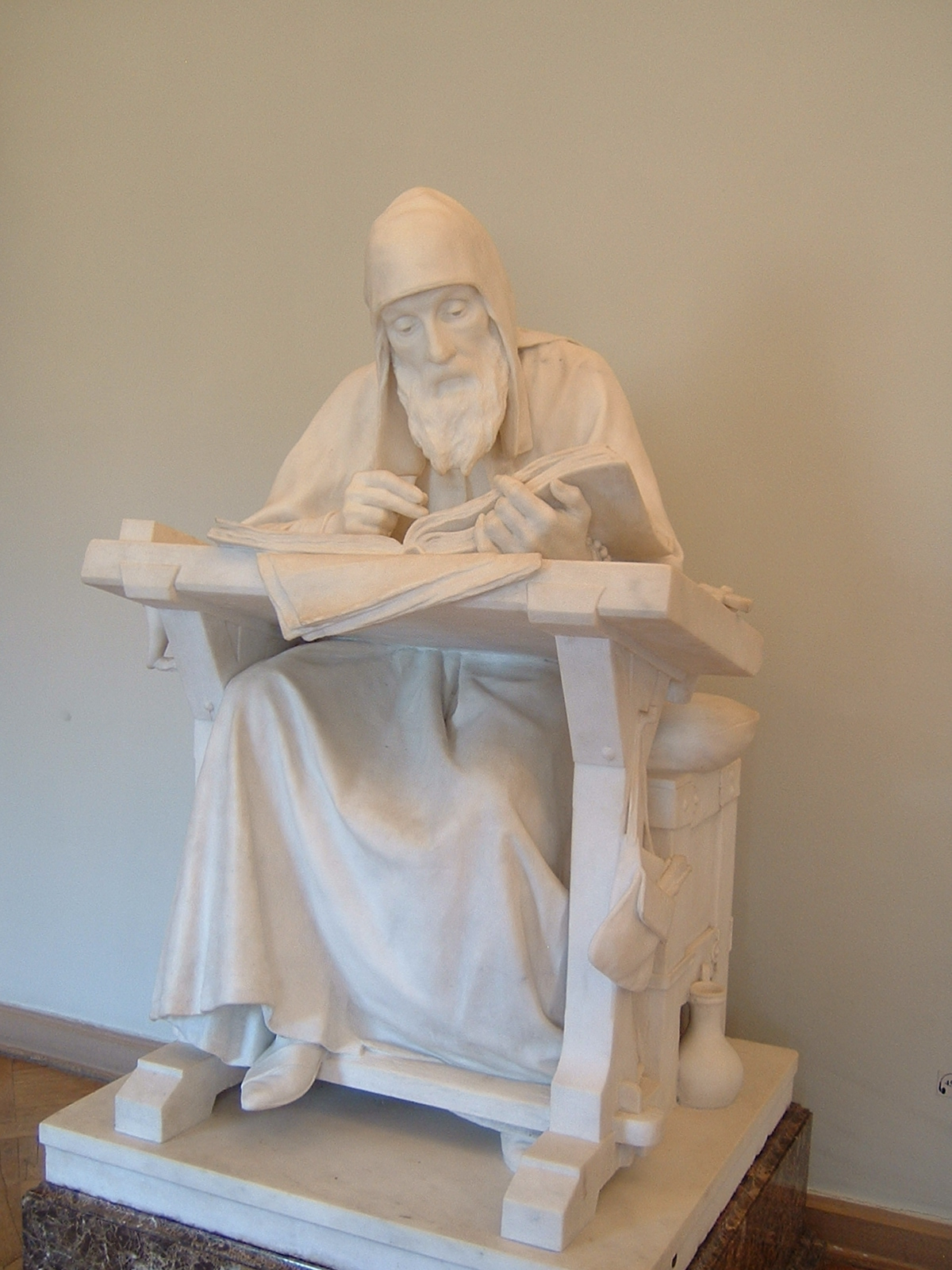
  Nestor the Chronicler
- Vladimir Minorsky, prominent historian of Persia
- Yagutil Mishiev, author of books about the history of Derbent, Dagestan, Russia
- Gerhardt Friedrich Müller, co-founder of the Russian Academy of Sciences, explorer and the first academic historian of Siberia, a founder of ethnography, author of the first academic account of Russian history, put forth the Normanist theory
- Aleksei Musin-Pushkin, prominent collector of ancient Russian manuscripts, discoverer of The Tale of Igor's Campaign
- Nestor the Chronicler, author of the Primary Chronicle (the first East Slavic chronicle) and several hagiographies, saint
- Alexey Okladnikov, prominent historian and archaeologist of Siberia and Mongolia
- Sergey Oldenburg, a founder of Russian Indology and the Academic Institute of Oriental Studies
- George Ostrogorsky, preeminent 20th-century Byzantinist
- Avraamy Palitsyn, 17th-century historian of the Time of Troubles
- Anna Pankratova (1897–1957), leading Soviet historian
- Evgeny Pashukanis, legal historian, wrote The General Theory of Law and Marxism
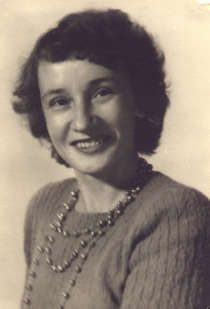
  Tatyana Proskuryakova
- Boris Piotrovsky, prominent researcher of Urartu, Scythia, and Nubia, long-term director of the Hermitage Museum
- Mikhail Piotrovsky, orientalist, current director of the Hermitage Museum
- Mikhail Pogodin, leading mid-19th-century Russian historian, proponent of the Normanist theory
- Mikhail Pokrovsky, Marxist historian prominent in the 1920s
- Natalia Polosmak, archaeologist of Pazyryk burials, discoverer of Pazyryk Ice Maiden
- Alexander Polovtsov, statesman, historian and Maecenas, founder of the Russian Historian Society
- Tatyana Proskuryakova, Mayanist scholar and archaeologist, deciphered the ancient Maya script
- Semyon Remezov, cartographer and the first historian of Siberia, author of the Remezov Chronicle
- Mikhail Rostovtsev, archeologist and economist, the first to thoroughly examine the social and economic systems of the Ancient World, excavated Dura-Europos
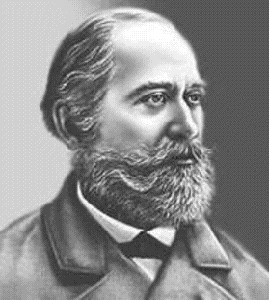
  Sergey Solovyov
- Nicholas Roerich, painter, archeologist, explorer of Central Asia, initiated the international Roerich's Pact on historical monuments protection
- Sergei Rudenko, discoverer of Scythian Pazyryk burials
- Boris Rybakov, historian and chief Soviet archaeologist for 40 years, primary opponent of the Normanist theory
- Viktor Sarianidi, discoverer of the Bactria-Margiana Archaeological Complex and the Bactrian Gold in Central Asia
- Mikhail Shcherbatov, man of Russian Enlightenment, conservative historian
- Sergey Solovyov, principal Russian 19th-century historian, author of the 29-volume History of Russia
- Vasily Struve, orientalist and historian of the Ancient World, put forth the Marxist theory of five socio-economic formations that dominated the Soviet education
- Yevgeny Tarle, author of the famous studies on Napoleon's invasion of Russia and on the Crimean War
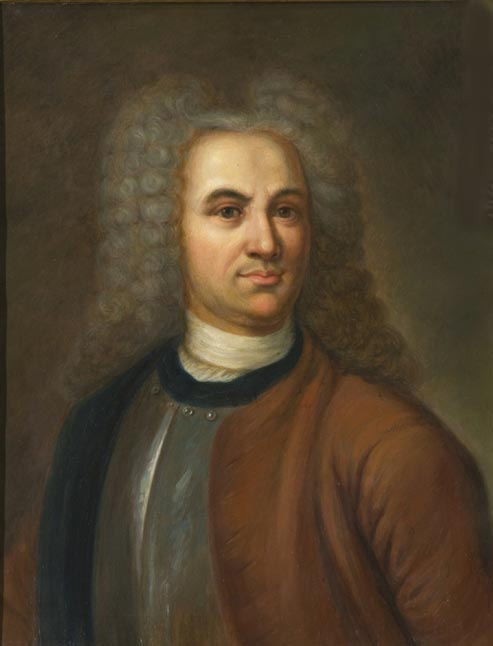
  Vasily Tatischev
- Vasily Tatischev, statesman, geographer and historian, discovered and published the Russkaya Pravda, Sudebnik and the controversial Ioachim Chronicle; wrote the first full-scale account of Russian history
- Mikhail Tikhomirov, major paleographer, published the Complete Collection of Russian Chronicles
- Boris Turayev, author of the first full-scale History of Ancient East
- Peter Turchin, population biologist and historian, coined the term cliodynamics
- Aleksey Uvarov, founder of the first Russian archaeological society, discovered over 750 ancient kurgans
- Nikolai Yadrintsev, discoverer of Genghis Khan's capital Karakorum and the Orkhon script of ancient Türks
- Valentin Yanin, preeminent researcher of birch bark documents
- Dmitry Yurasov, historian of soviet repression

=== Linguists and ethnographers ===
- Vasily Abaev, major researcher of Iranian languages
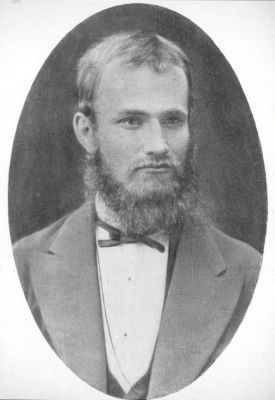
  Ivan Baudouin de Courtenay
- Alexander Afanasyev, leading Russian folklorist, recorded and published over 600 Russian fairy tales, by far the largest folktale collection by any one man in the world
- Ivan Baudouin de Courtenay, co-invented the concept of phoneme and the systematic treatment of linguistical alternations, pioneered synchronic analysis and mathematical linguistics
- Vladimir Bogoraz, researcher of Chukchi people, founder of the Institute of the Peoples of the North
- Otto von Böhtlingk, prominent Indologist and Sanskrit grammarian
- Fyodor Buslaev, philologist and folklorist, representative of the Mythological school of comparative literature
- Marina Butovskaya, ethologist and cultural anthropologist
- Vladimir Dahl, Russian language lexicographer of the 19th century, folklorist and turkologist, author of the Explanatory Dictionary of the Live Great Russian language
- Johann Gottlieb Georgi, explorer, published the first full-scale work on ethnography of indigenous peoples of Russia
- Dmitry Gerasimov, medieval translator, diplomat and philologist, correspondent of European Renaissance scholars
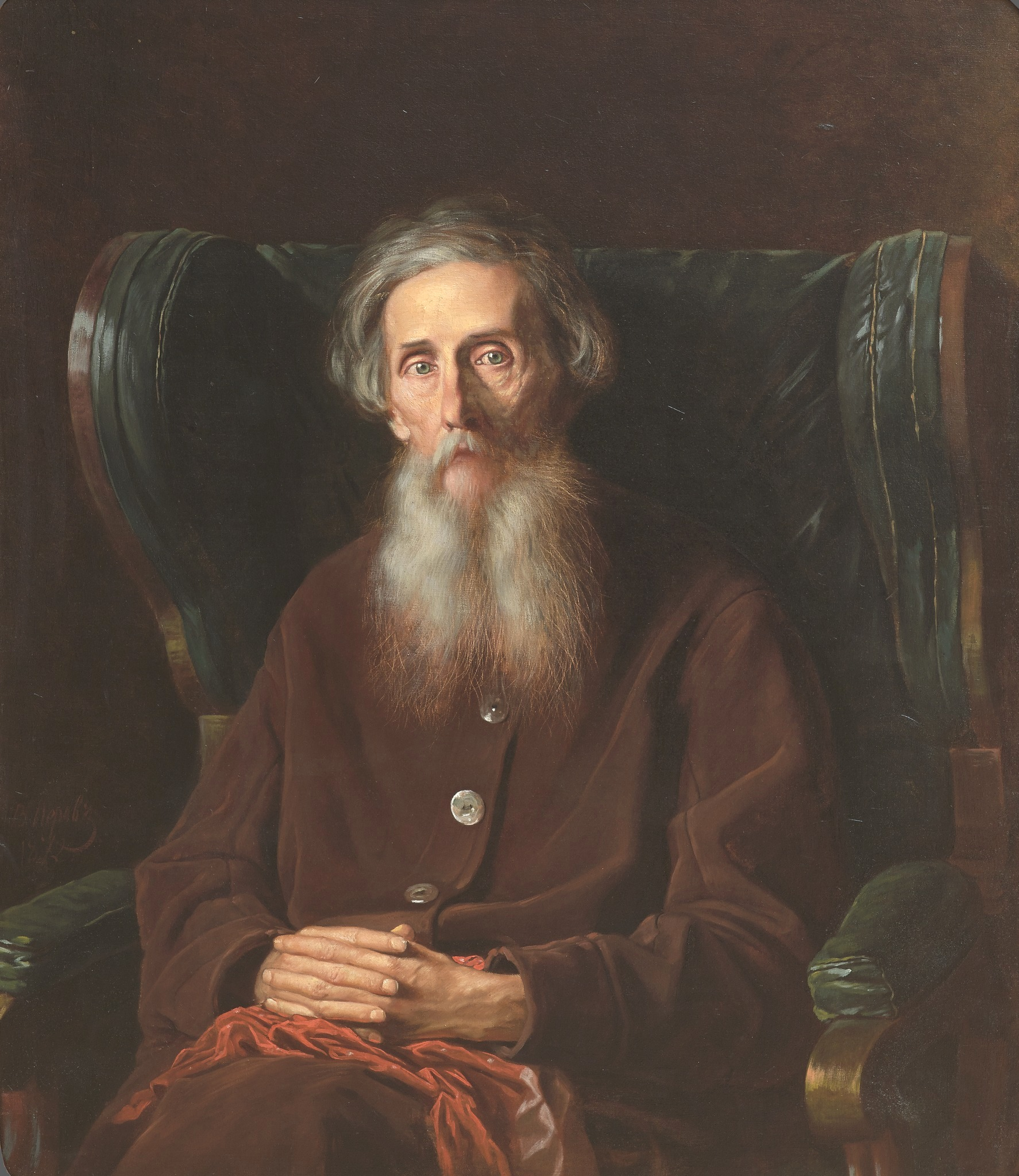
  Vladimir Dahl
- Vladislav Illich-Svitych, founder of Nostratic linguistics
- Vyacheslav Ivanov, founder of glottalic theory of Indo-European consonantism
- Roman Jakobson, preeminent 20th-century linguist and literary theorist, a founder of phonology, major Slavist, author of Jackobson's Communication Model
- Pyotr Kafarov, prominent sinologist, developed the cyrillization of Chinese, discovered The Secret History of the Mongols
- Yuri Knorozov, linguist, epigrapher and ethnographer, deciphered the Maya script, proposed a decipherment for the Indus script
- Nikolay Krushevsky, co-inventor of the concept of phoneme and the systematic treatment of linguistical alternations
- Gerasim Lebedev, pioneer of Indology, introduced Bengali script typing to Europe, founded the first European-style theater in India
- Dmitry Likhachov, major 20th-century expert on Old East Slavic and literature
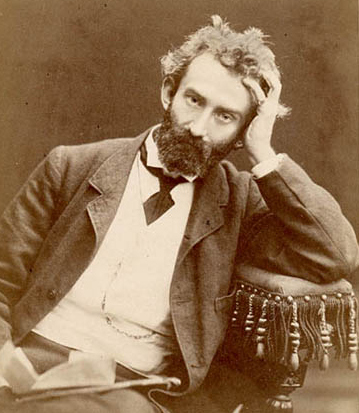
  Nicholai Miklukho-Maklai
- Mikhail Lomonosov, polymath scientist and artist, wrote a grammar that reformed Russian literary language by combining Old Church Slavonic with vernacular tongue
- Nikolay Lvov, polymath artist and scientist, compiled the first significant collection of Russian folk songs, published epic bylinas
- Richard Maack, naturalist and ethnographer of Siberia
- Sergey Malov, turkologist, classified the Turkic alphabets, deciphered the ancient Orkhon script
- Nicholas Marr, put forth a pseudo-linguistic Japhetic theory on the origin of language
- Igor Melchuk, structural linguist, author of Meaning-Text Theory
- Nicholai Miklukho-Maklai, anthropologist who lived and traveled among the natives of Papua New Guinea and Pacific islands, prominent anti-racist
- Semyon Novgorodov, Yakut politician and linguist, creator of written Yakut language (Sakha scripts)

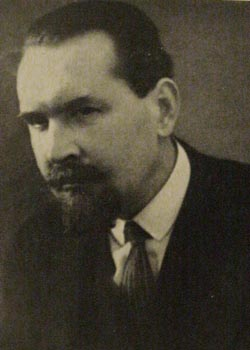
Nikolai Trubetzkoy

- Stephan of Perm, 14th-century missionary, converted Komi Permyaks to Christianity and invented the Old Permic script
- Yevgeny Polivanov, linguist, orientalist and polyglot, developed the cyrillization of Japanese
- Nicholas Poppe, prominent Altaic-language researcher
- Vladimir Propp, formalist scholar, major researcher of folk tales and mythology
- Isaac Jacob Schmidt, first researcher of Mongolian language
- Leopold von Schrenck, naturalist and ethnographer, coined the term Paleo-Asiatic peoples, the first director of the Peter the Great Museum of Anthropology and Ethnography
- Aleksey Shakhmatov, founder of textology, prepared major 20th-century reforms of Russian orthography, pioneered the systematic research of Old Russian and medieval Russian literature
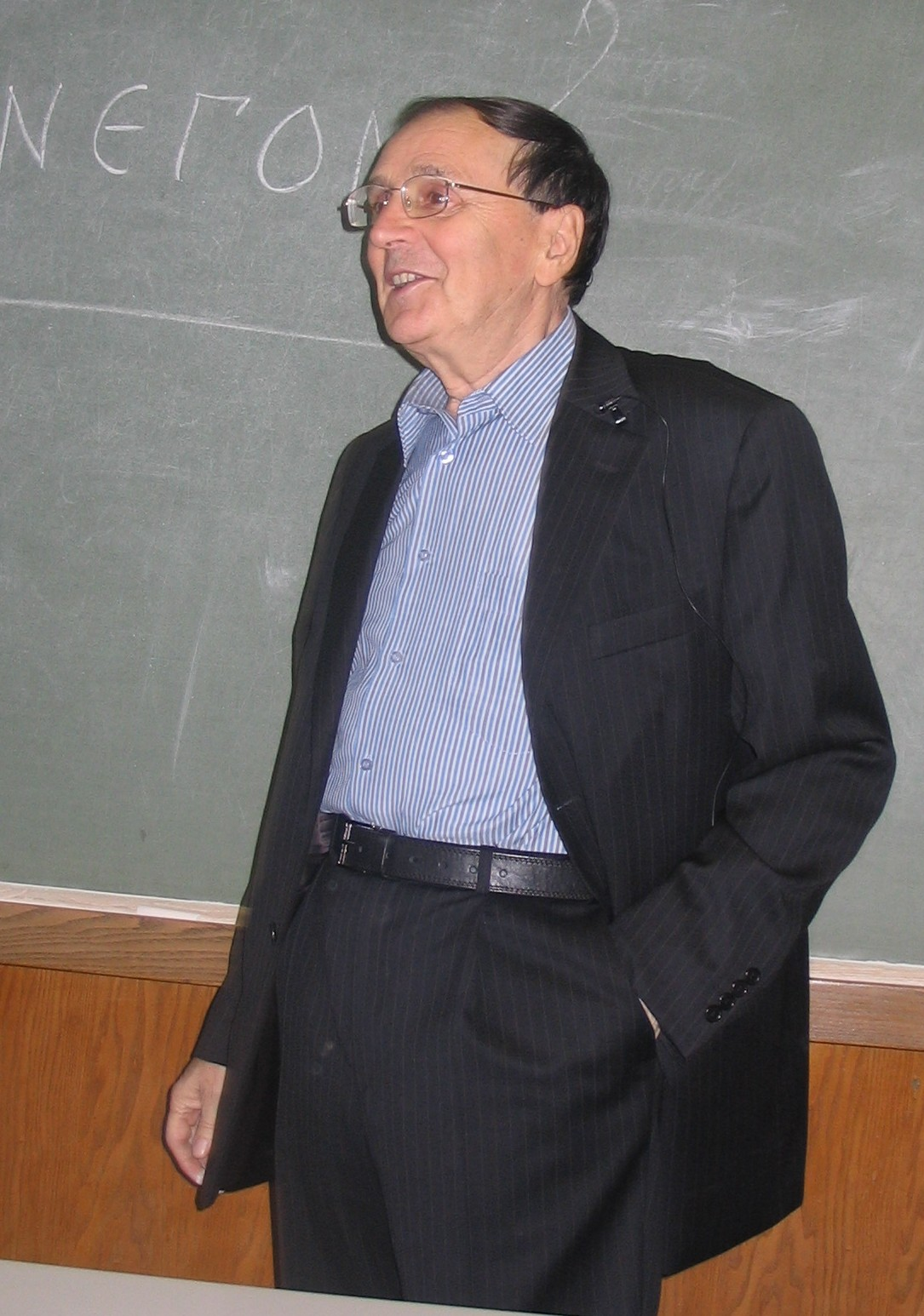
  Andrey Zaliznyak
- Lev Shcherba, phonetician and phonologist, author of the glokaya kuzdra phrase
- Fyodor Shcherbatskoy, Indologist, initiated the scholarly study of Buddhist philosophy in the West
- Izmail Sreznevsky, leading 19th-century Slavist, published Codex Zographensis, Codex Marianus and Kiev Fragments
- Sergei Starostin, prominent supporter of Altaic theory, proposed the Dené–Caucasian languages macrofamily, reconstructed several Eurasian proto-languages
- Vasily Tatischev, geographer, ethnographer and historian, compiled the first encyclopedic dictionary of Russian language
- Tenevil, Chukchi reindeer herder who created a writing system for the Chukchi language
- Nikolai Trubetzkoy, principal developer of phonology and inventor of morphophonology, defined phoneme, a founder of the Prague School of structural linguistics
- Dmitry Ushakov, author of the academic Explanatory Dictionary of the Russian Language
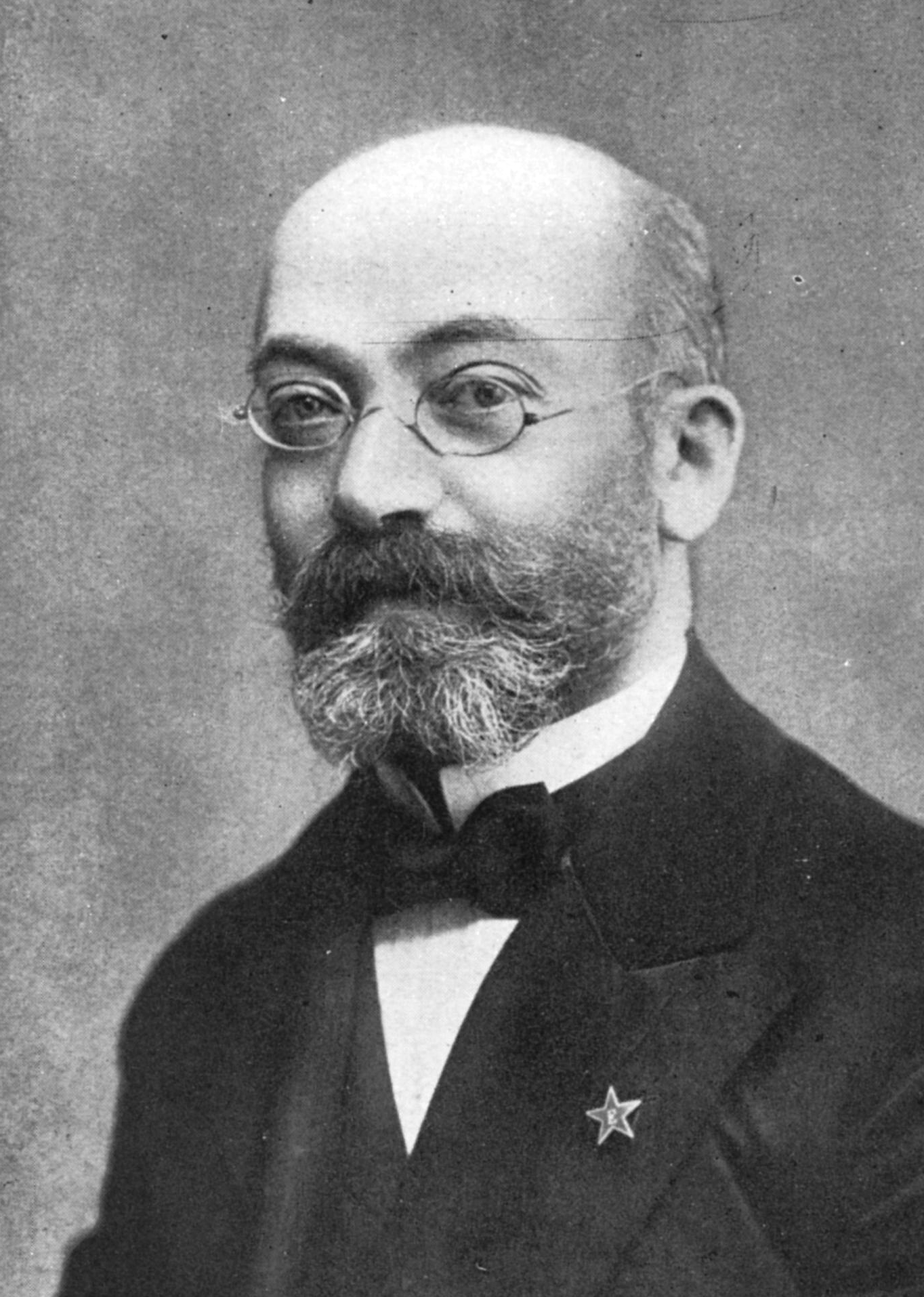
  Ludwik Zamenhof
- Max Vasmer, leading Indo-European, Finno-Ugric and Turkic etymologist, author of the Etymological dictionary of the Russian language
- Viktor Vinogradov, linguist and philologist, founder of the Russian Language Institute
- Alexander Vostokov, coined the term Old Church Slavonic, discovered the Ostromir Gospel (the most ancient book in East Slavic language), pioneered the research of Russian grammar
- Andrey Zaliznyak, author of the comprehensive systematic description of Russian inflection, prominent researcher of the Old Novgorod dialect and birch bark documents, proved the authenticity of the Tale of Igor's Campaign
- L. L. Zamenhof, inventor of Esperanto, the most widely spoken constructed international auxiliary language

=== Mathematicians ===
- Aleksandr Aleksandrov, developer of CAT(k) space and Alexandrov's uniqueness theorem in geometry
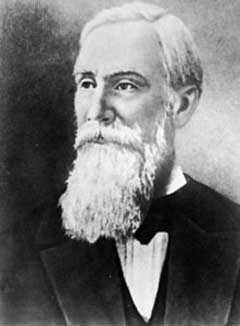
  Pafnuti Chebyshev
- Pavel Alexandrov, author of the Alexandroff compactification and the Alexandrov topology
- Dmitri Anosov, developed Anosov diffeomorphism
- Vladimir Arnold, an author of the Kolmogorov–Arnold–Moser theorem in dynamical systems, solved Hilbert's 13th problem, raised the ADE classification and Arnold's rouble problems
- Sergey Bernstein, developed the Bernstein polynomial, Bernstein's theorem and Bernstein inequalities in probability theory
- Nikolay Bogolyubov, mathematician and theoretical physicist, author of the edge-of-the-wedge theorem, Krylov–Bogolyubov theorem, describing function and multiple contributions to quantum mechanics
- Nikolai Chebotaryov, author of Chebotarev's density theorem
- Pafnuti Chebyshev, prominent tutor and founding father of Russian mathematics,
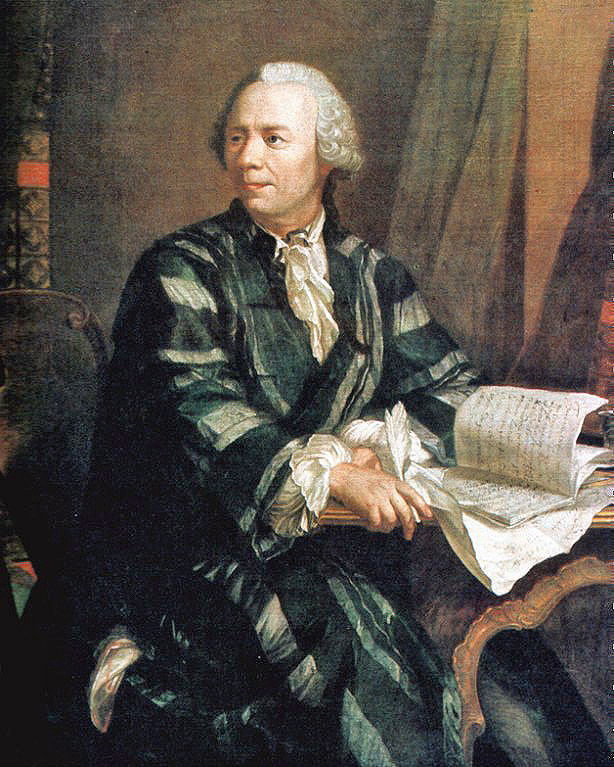
  Leonhard Euler
  contributed to probability, statistics and number theory, author of the Chebyshev's inequality, Chebyshev distance, Chebyshev function, Chebyshev equation
- Boris Delaunay, inventor of Delaunay triangulation, organised the first Soviet Student Olympiad in mathematics
- Vladimir Drinfeld, mathematician and theoretical physicist, introduced quantum groups and ADHM construction, Fields Medal winner
- Eugene Dynkin, developed Dynkin diagram, Doob–Dynkin lemma and Dynkin system in algebra and probability
- Leonhard Euler, preeminent 18th-century mathematician, arguably the greatest of all time, made important discoveries in mathematical analysis, graph theory and number theory, introduced much of the modern mathematical terminology and notation (mathematical function, Euler's number, Euler circles etc.)
- Yevgraf Fyodorov, identified Periodic graph in geometry, the first to identify all of the 230 space groups of crystals
- Boris Galerkin, developed the Galerkin method in numerical analysis
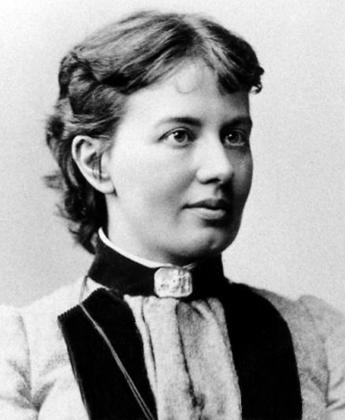
  Sofia Kovalevskaya
- Israel Gelfand, contributed to many areas of mathematics, including group theory, representation theory and linear algebra, author of the Gelfand representation, Gelfand pair, Gelfand triple, integral geometry; Wolf Prize winner
- Alexander Gelfond, author of Gelfond's theorem, provided means to obtain infinite number of transcendentals, including Gelfond–Schneider constant and Gelfond's constant, Wolf Prize in Mathematics winner
- Mikhail Gromov, a prominent developer of geometric group theory, inventor of homotopy principle, introduced Gromov's compactness theorems in geometry and topology, Gromov norm, Gromov product; Wolf Prize winner
- Leonid Kantorovich, founder of linear programming, introduced the Kantorovich inequality and Kantorovich metric, developed the theory of optimal allocation of resources, Nobel Prize in Economics winner
- Aleksandr Khinchin, developed the Pollaczek-Khinchine formula, Wiener–Khinchin theorem and Khinchin inequality in probability

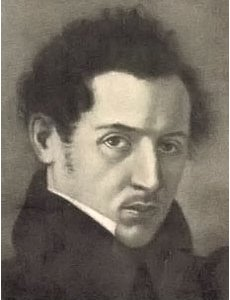
Nikolai Lobachevsky

- Andrey Kolmogorov, preeminent 20th-century mathematician, Wolf Prize winner; developed probability axioms, Chapman–Kolmogorov equation and Kolmogorov extension theorem in probability; Kolmogorov complexity
- Maxim Kontsevich, author of the Kontsevich integral and Kontsevich quantization formula, Fields Medal winner
- Sofia Kovalevskaya, the first woman professor in Northern Europe and Russia, the first female professor of mathematics, discovered the Kovalevskaya top
- Mark Krein, developed the Tannaka–Krein duality, Krein–Milman theorem and Krein space, Wolf Prize winner
- Nikolay Krylov, author of the edge-of-the-wedge theorem, Krylov–Bogolyubov theorem and describing function
- Yuri Linnik, developed Linnik's theorem in analytic number theory
- Nikolai Lobachevsky, a Copernicus of Geometry who created the first non-Euclidean geometry (Lobachevskian or hyperbolic geometry)
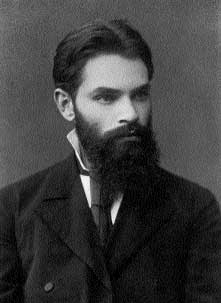
  Aleksandr Lyapunov
- Nikolai Lusin, developed Luzin's theorem, Luzin spaces and Luzin sets in descriptive set theory
- Aleksandr Lyapunov, founder of stability theory, author of the Lyapunov's central limit theorem, Lyapunov equation, Lyapunov fractal, Lyapunov time
- Yuri Manin, author of the Gauss–Manin connection in algebraic geometry, Manin-Mumford conjecture and Manin obstruction in diophantine geometry
- Grigory Margulis, worked on lattices in Lie groups, Wolf Prize and Fields Medal winner
- Andrey Markov, invented the Markov chains, proved Markov brothers' inequality, author of the hidden Markov model, Markov number, Markov property, Markov's inequality, Markov processes, Markov random field, Markov algorithm
- Yuri Matiyasevich, author of Matiyasevich's theorem in set theory, provided negative solution for Hilbert's tenth problem
- Pyotr Novikov, solved the word problem for groups and Burnside's problem
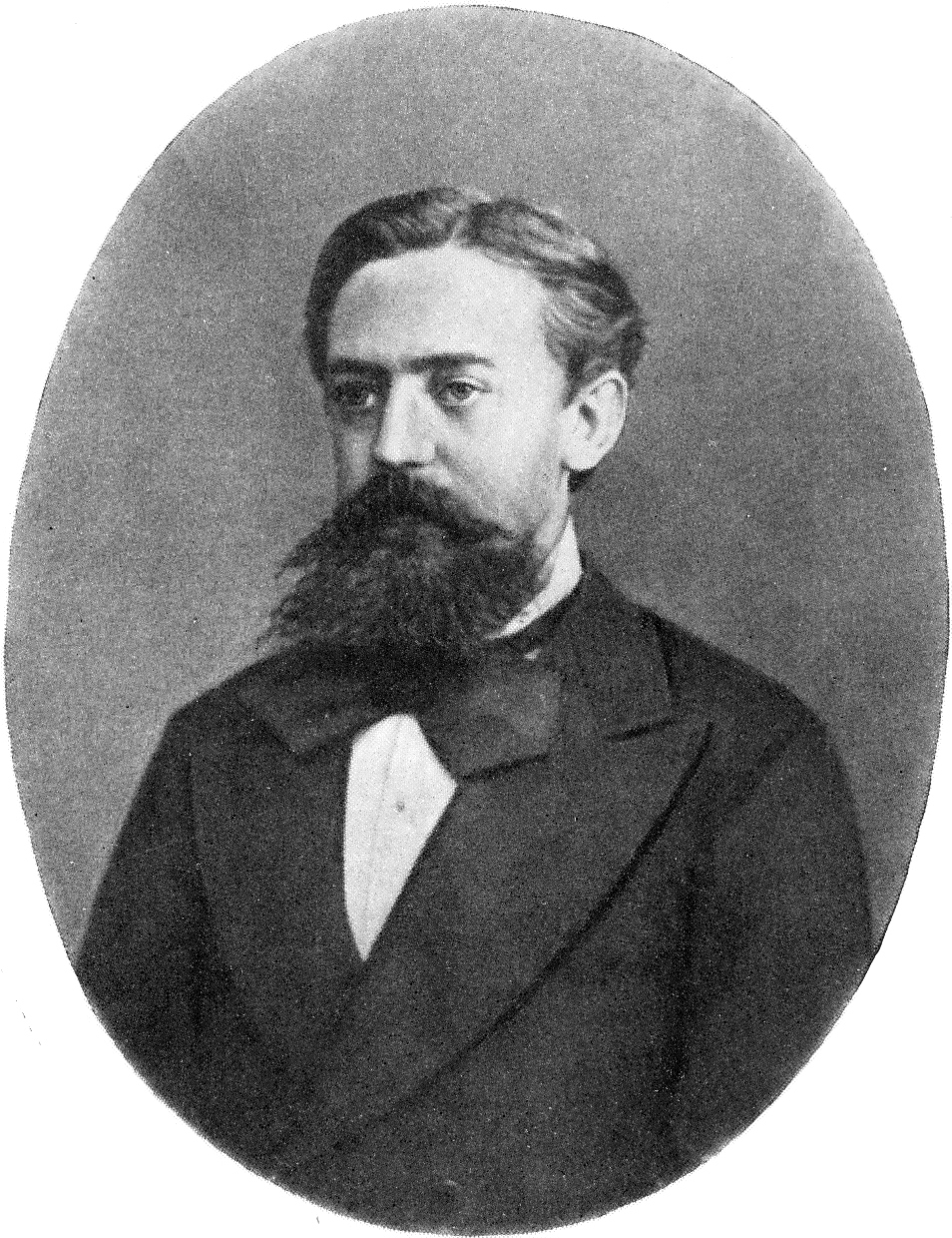
  Andrey Markov
- Sergey Novikov, worked on algebraic topology and soliton theory, developed Adams–Novikov spectral sequence and Novikov conjecture, Wolf Prize and Fields Medal winner
- Andrei Okounkov, researcher of infinite symmetric groups and Hilbert scheme, Fields Medal winner
- Mikhail Ostrogradsky, mathematician and physicist, author of divergence theorem and partial fractions in integration
- Grigori Perelman, major contributor to Riemannian geometry and topology, proved Geometrization conjecture and Poincaré conjecture, won a Fields Medal and the first Clay Millennium Prize Problems Award (declined both)
- Lev Pontryagin, blind mathematician, developed Pontryagin duality and Pontryagin classes in topology, and Pontryagin's minimum principle in optimal control
- Lev Schnirelmann, developed the Lusternik–Schnirelmann category in topology and Schnirelmann density of numbers
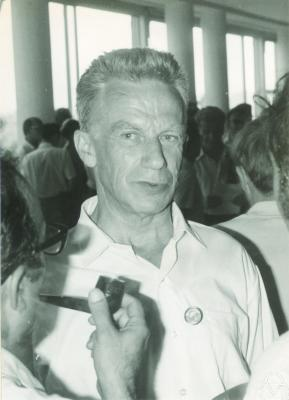
  Sergei Sobolev
- Moses Schönfinkel, inventor of combinatory logic
- Yakov Sinai, developed the Kolmogorov–Sinai entropy and Sinai billiard, Wolf and Abel Prize winner
- Stanislav Smirnov, prominent researcher of triangular lattice, Fields Medalist
- Sergei Sobolev, introduced the Sobolev spaces and mathematical distributions, co-developed the first ternary computer Setun
- Vladimir Steklov, founder of Steklov Institute of Mathematics, proved theorems on generalized Fourier series
- Jakow Trachtenberg, developed the Trachtenberg system of mental calculation
- Andrey Tikhonov, author of Tikhonov regularization of ill-posed problems, Tikhonov space and Tikhonov's theorem (central in general topology), invented magnetotellurics
- Pavel Urysohn, developed the metrization theorems, Urysohn's Lemma and Fréchet–Urysohn space in topology
- Nicolay Vasilyev, inventor of non-Aristotelian logic, the forerunner of paraconsistent and multi-valued logics
- Ivan Vinogradov, developed Vinogradov's theorem and Pólya–Vinogradov inequality in analytic number theory
- Vladimir Voevodsky, introduced a homotopy theory for schemes and modern motivic cohomology, Fields Medalist
- Georgy Voronoy, invented the Voronoi diagram
- Dmitry Yegorov, author of Egorov's Theorem in mathematical analysis
- Efim Zelmanov, solved the restricted Burnside problem, Fields Medal winner

=== Astronomers and cosmologists ===
- Viktor Ambartsumian, one of the founders of theoretical astrophysics, discoverer of stellar associations, founder of Byurakan Observatory
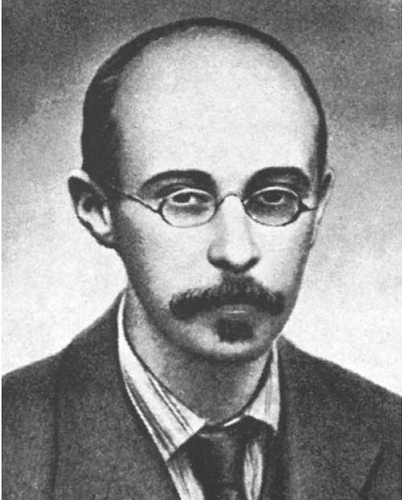
  Alexander Fridman
- Vladimir Belinski, an author of the BKL singularity model of the Universe
- Aristarkh Belopolsky, invented a spectrograph based on the Doppler effect, among the first photographers of stellar spectra
- Fyodor Bredikhin, developed the theory of comet tails, meteors and meteor showers, a director of the Pulkovo Observatory
- Jacob Bruce, statesman, naturalist and astronomer, founder of the first observatory in Russia (in the Sukharev Tower)
- Lyudmila Chernykh, astronomer, discovered 268 asteroids
- Nikolai Chernykh, astronomer, discovered 537 asteroids and 2 comets
- Alexander Fridman, derived the Friedmann equations (expanding-universe solution to the field equations of general relativity), an author of the FLRW metric of Universe
- George Gamow, discovered alpha decay via quantum tunneling and Gamow factor in stellar nucleosynthesis, introduced the Big Bang nucleosynthesis theory, predicted cosmic microwave background
- Matvey Gusev, first to prove the non-sphericity of the Moon, pioneer of photography in astronomy
- Nikolai Kardashev, astrophysicist, inventor of Kardashev scale for ranking the space civilizations
- Isaak Khalatnikov, an author of the BKL singularity
- Marian Kowalski, first to measure the rotation of the Milky Way
- Anders Johan Lexell, mathematician, researcher of celestial mechanics and comet astronomy, proved that Uranus is a planet rather than a comet
- Andrei Linde, created the chaotic inflation theory of the Universe
- Evgeny Lifshitz, an author of the BKL singularity
- Mikhail Lomonosov polymath, invented the off-axis reflecting telescope, discovered the atmosphere of Venus
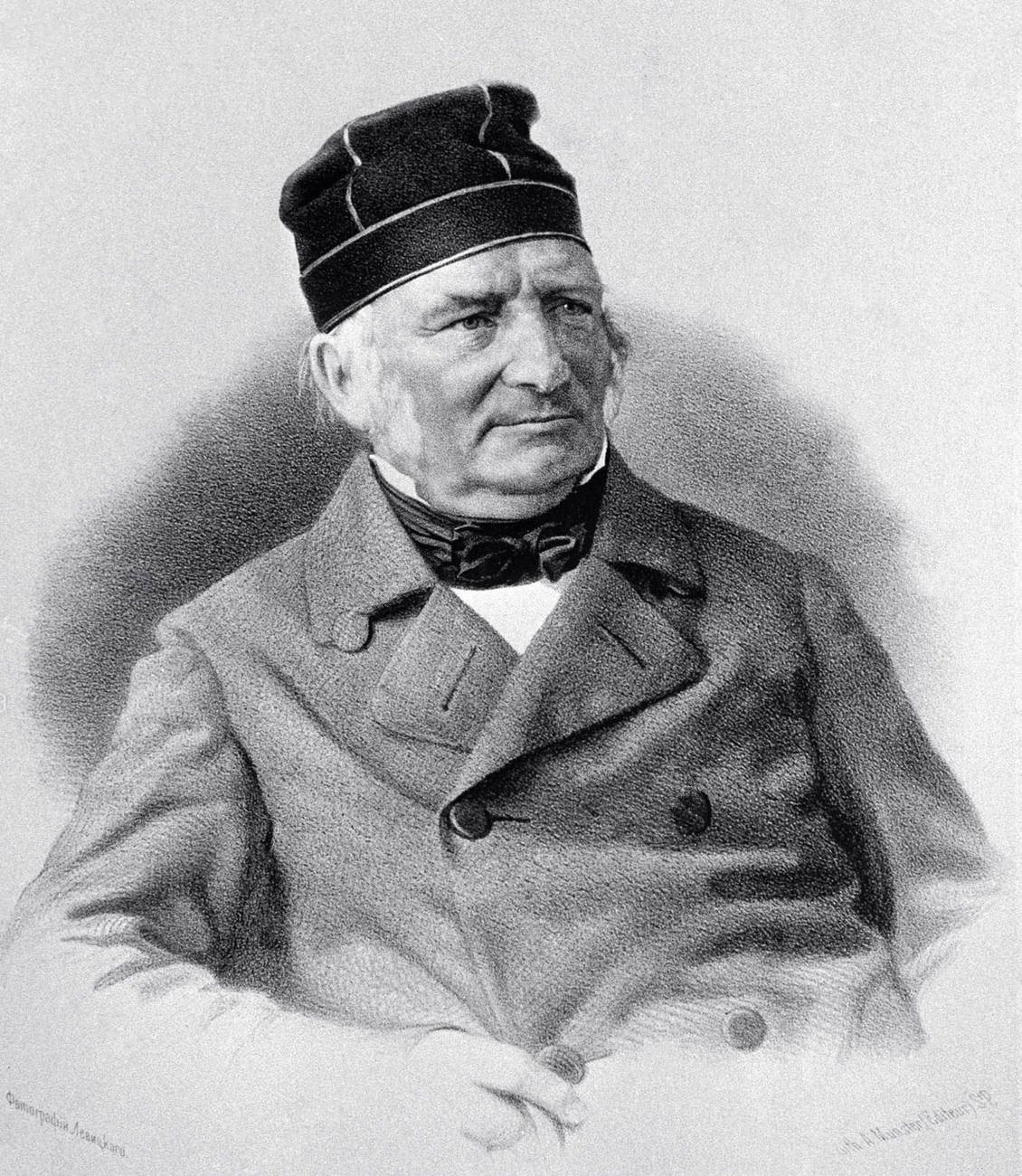
  Friedrich Wilhelm Struve
- Dmitri Dmitrievich Maksutov, invented the Maksutov telescope
- Viktor Safronov, author of the planetesimal hypothesis of planet formation
- Grigory Shayn, first director of the Crimean Astrophysical Observatory, co-developed a method for stellar rotation measurement
- Iosif Shklovsky, prominent radio astronomer, cosmic rays and extraterrestrial life researcher
- Friedrich Wilhelm Struve, founder and the first director of the Pulkovo Observatory, prominent researcher of double stars, initiated the construction of 2,820 km long Struve Geodetic Arc, progenitor of the Struve family of astronomers
- Otto Lyudvigovich Struve, co-developed a method for stellar rotation measurement, directed several U.S. observatories
- Otto Wilhelm von Struve, director of the Pulkovo Observatory, discovered over 500 double stars
- Rashid Sunyaev, co-predicted the Sunyaev–Zel'dovich effect of CMB distortion
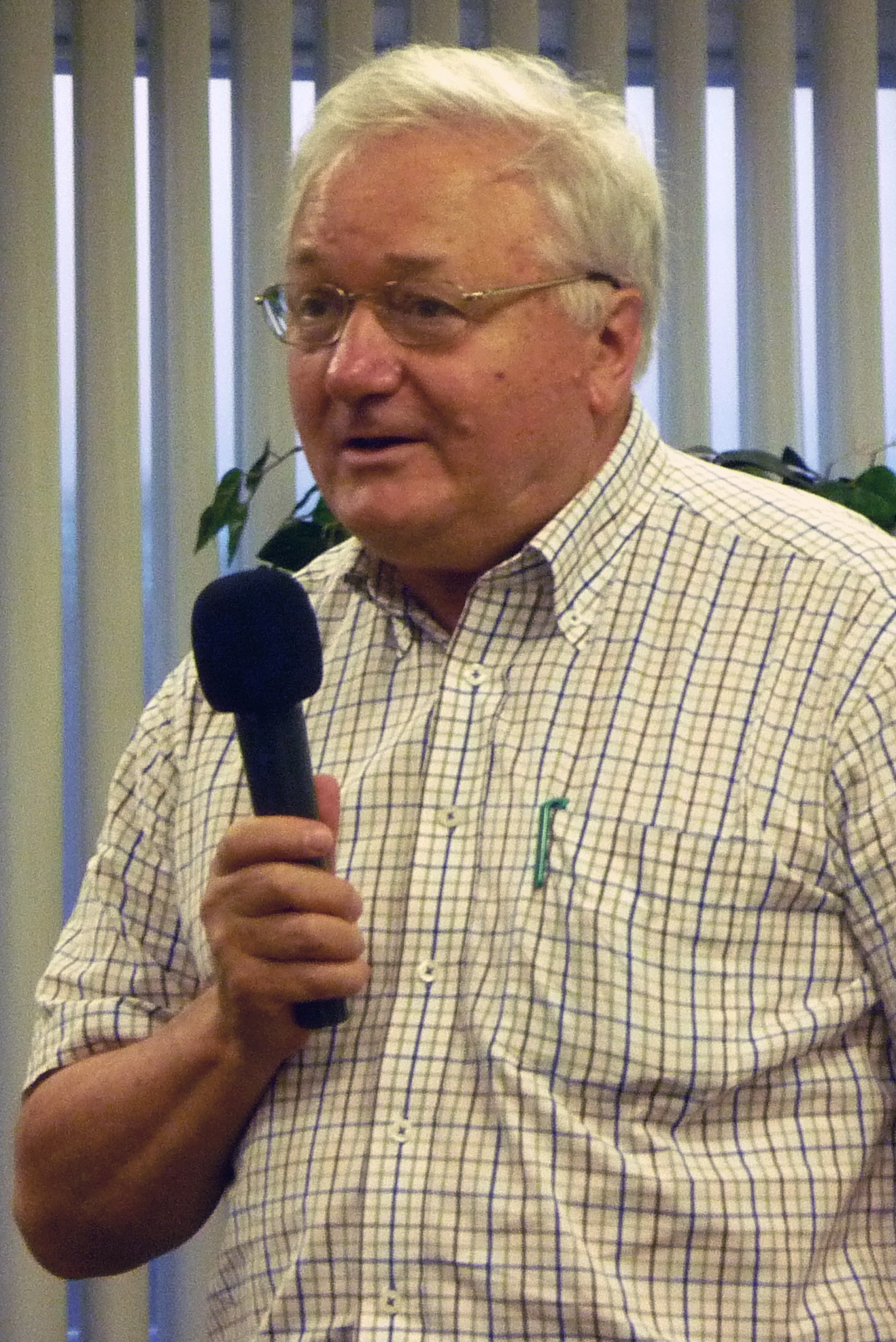
  Rashid Sunyaev
- George Volkoff, predicted the existence of neutron stars
- Boris Vorontsov-Velyaminov, discovered the absorption of light by interstellar dust, author of the Morphological Catalogue of Galaxies
- Ivan Yarkovsky, discovered the YORP and Yarkovsky effect of meteoroids and asteroids
- Aleksandr Zaitsev, coined the term Messaging to Extra-Terrestrial Intelligence, conducted the first intercontinental radar astronomy experiment, transmitted the Cosmic Calls
- Yakov Zeldovich, physicist, astrophysicist and cosmologist, the first to suggest that accretion discs around massive black holes are responsible for the quasar radiation, co-predicted the Sunyaev–Zel'dovich effect

=== Physicists ===
- Alexei Abrikosov, discovered how magnetic flux can penetrate a superconductor (the Abrikosov vortex),
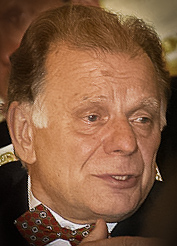
  Zhores Alferov
  Nobel Prize winner
- Franz Aepinus, related electricity and magnetism, proved the electric nature of pyroelectricity, explained electric polarization and electrostatic induction, invented achromatic microscope
- Zhores Alferov, inventor of modern heterotransistor, Nobel Prize winner
- Abram Alikhanov, a prominent researcher of cosmic rays, built the first nuclear reactors in the USSR, founder of Institute for Theoretical and Experimental Physics (ITEP)
- Lev Artsimovich, builder of the first tokamak, researcher of high temperature plasma
- Gurgen Askaryan, predicted self focusing of light, discovered Askaryan effect in the particle physics
- Nikolay Basov, physicist, co-inventor of laser and maser, Nobel Prize winner
- Nikolay Bogolyubov, co-developed the BBGKY hierarchy, formulated a microscopic theory of superconductivity, suggested a triplet quark model, introduced a new quantum degree of freedom (color charge)
- Gersh Budker, invented electron cooling, co-invented collider
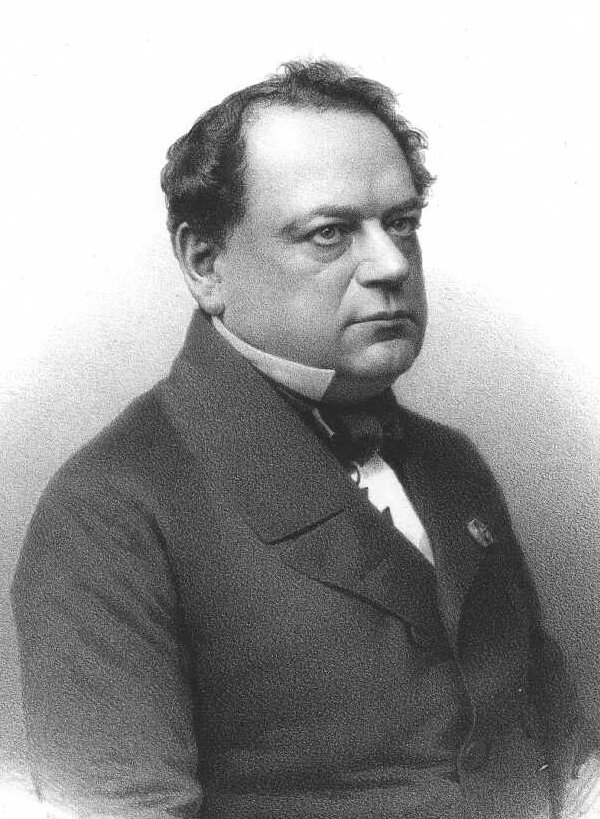
  Boris Jacobi
- Sergey Chaplygin, a founder of aero- and hydrodynamics, formulated the Chaplygin's equations and Chaplygin gas concept
- Pavel Cherenkov, discoverer of Cherenkov radiation, Nobel Prize winner
- Yuri Denisyuk, inventor of 3D holography
- Nikolay Dollezhal, designer of the reactor for the first nuclear power plant, developer of VVER-type reactors
- Ludvig Faddeev, discoverer of Faddeev–Popov ghosts and Faddeev equations in quantum physics
- Georgy Flyorov, an initiator of the Soviet atomic bomb project, co-discoverer of seaborgium and bohrium, founder of the Joint Institute for Nuclear Research
- Vladimir Fock, developed the Fock space, Fock state and the Hartree–Fock method in quantum mechanics
- Ilya Frank, explained the phenomenon of Cherenkov radiation, Nobel Prize winner
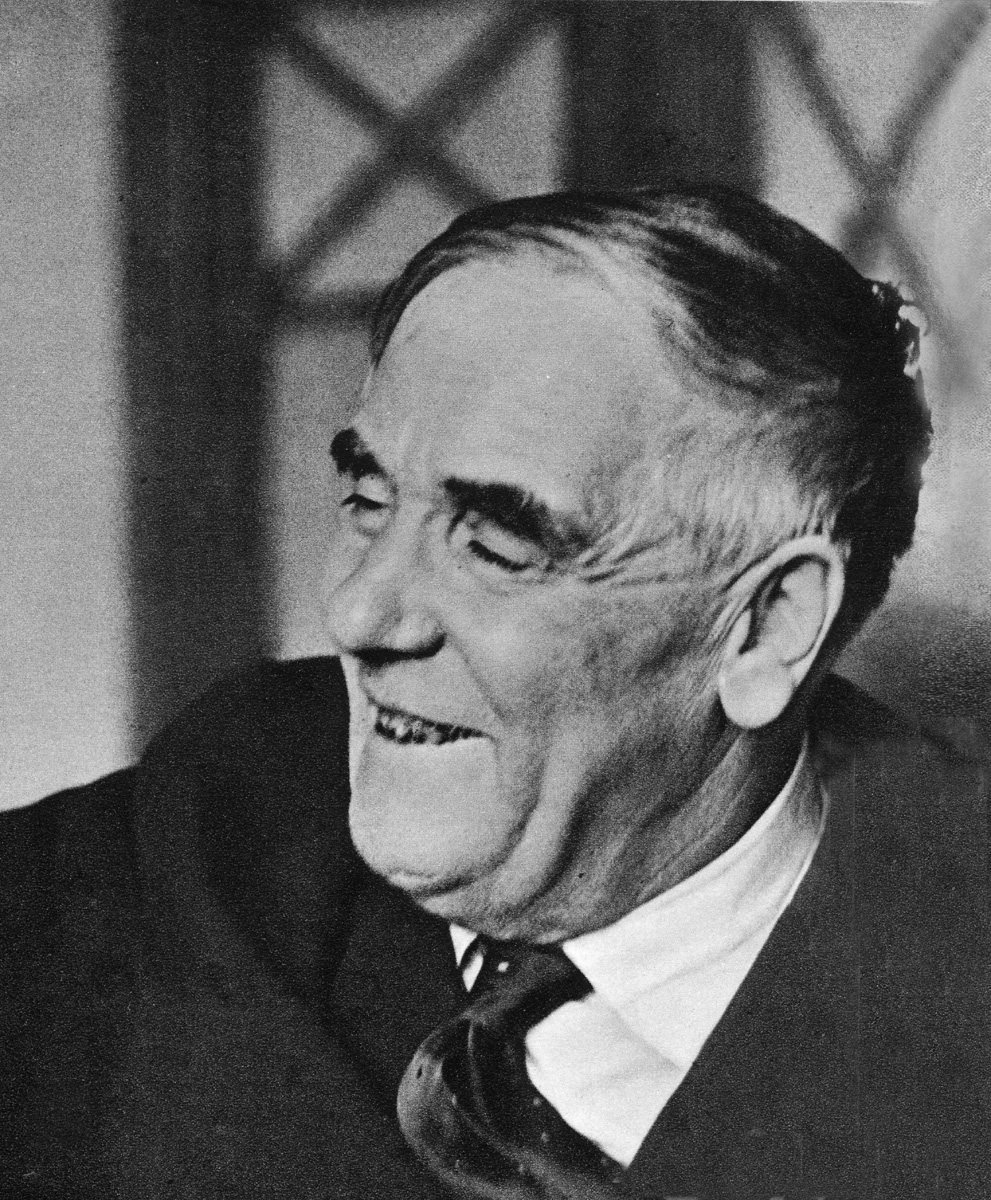
  Pyotr Kapitsa
- Yakov Frenkel, introduced the notion of electron hole, discovered the Frenkel defect of a crystal lattice, described the Poole–Frenkel effect in solid-state physics
- Andre Geim, inventor of graphene, developer of gecko tape, Nobel Prize winner, and also Ig Nobel Prize winner for diamagnetic levitation of a living frog
- Vitaly Ginzburg, co-author of the Ginzburg–Landau theory of superconductivity, a developer of hydrogen bomb, Nobel Prize winner
- Vladimir Gribov, introduced pomeron, DGLAP equations and Gribov ambiguity
- Abram Ioffe, founder of the Soviet physics school, tutor of many prominent scientists
- Dmitri Ivanenko, proposed the first atomic nucleus and nuclear shell models, predicted the synchrotron radiation, author of the hypothesis of quark stars
- Boris Jacobi, formulated the Maximum power theorem in electrical engineering, invented electroplating, electrotyping, galvanoplastic sculpture and electric boat
- Pyotr Kapitsa, originated the techniques for creating ultrastrong magnetic fields, co-discovered a way to measure the magnetic field of an atomic nucleus discovered superfluidity, Nobel Prize winner
- Yuly Khariton, chief designer of the Soviet atomic bomb, co-developer of the Tsar Bomb
- Orest Khvolson, first to study the Chwolson ring effect of gravitational lensing
- Igor Kurchatov, builder of the first nuclear power plant, developer of the first marine nuclear reactors for surface ships
- Lev Landau, theoretical physicist, developed the Ginzburg–Landau theory of superconductivity, explained the Landau damping in plasma physics, pointed out the Landau pole in quantum electrodynamics, co-author of the famous Course of Theoretical Physics, Nobel Prize winner
- Grigory Landsberg, co-discoverer of Raman scattering of light
- Mikhail Lavrentyev, founder of the Siberian Division of the Soviet Academy of Sciences and Akademgorodok in Novosibirsk
- Pyotr Lebedev, first to measure the radiation pressure on a solid body, thus privoving the Maxwell's theory of electromagnetism
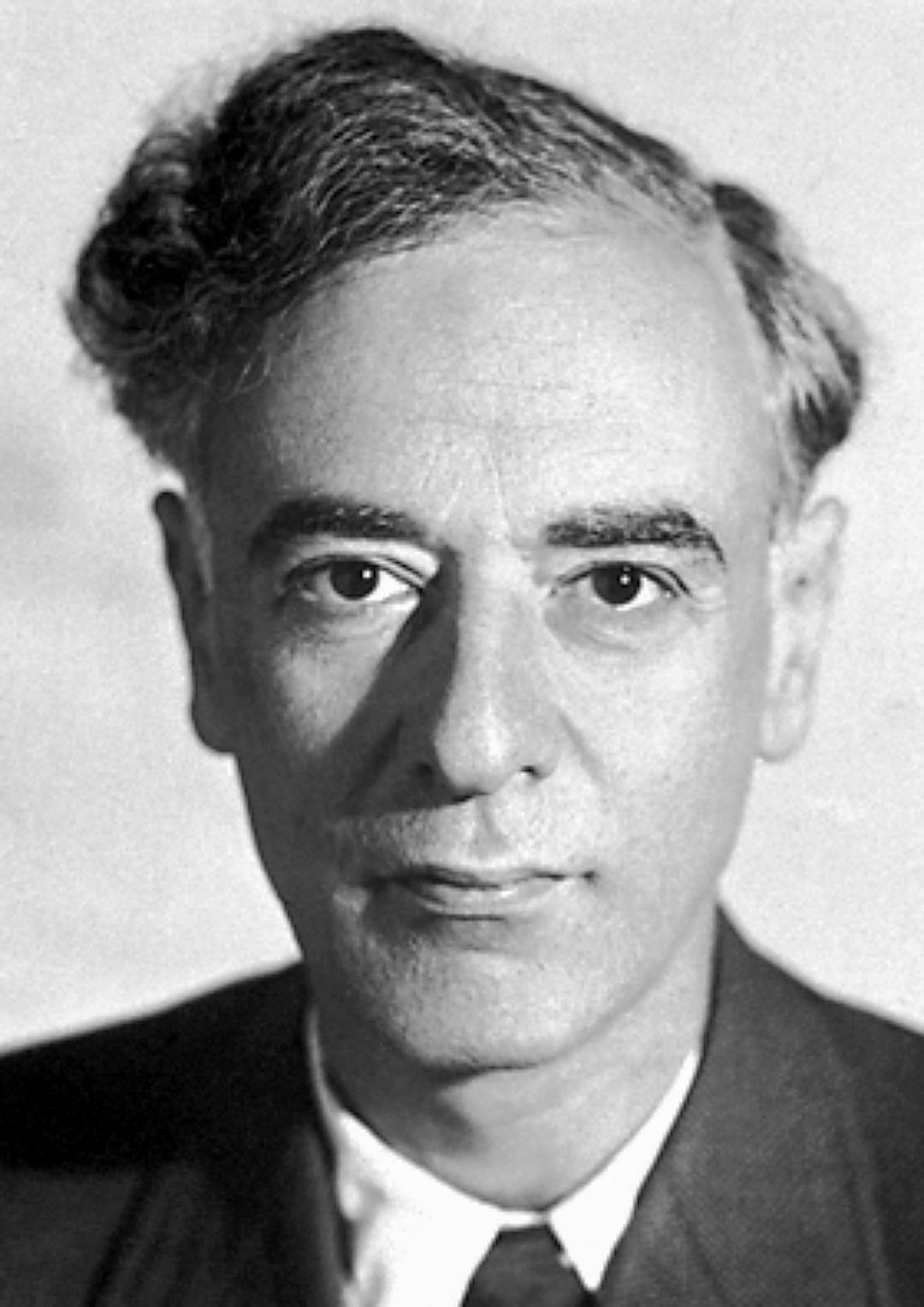
  Lev Landau
- Heinrich Lenz, discovered the Lenz's law of electromagnetism
- Evgeny Lifshitz, an author of the BKL singularity model of the Universe, co-author of the Course of Theoretical Physics
- Mikhail Lomonosov, polymath scientist, artist and inventor; proposed the law of conservation of matter, disproved the phlogiston theory
- Oleg Losev, inventor of light-emitting diode and crystadine
- Alexander Makarov, inventor of orbitrap
- Boris Mamyrin, inventor of reflectron
- Leonid Mandelshtam, co-discoverer of Raman effect
- Konstantin Novoselov, inventor of graphene, developer of gecko tape, Nobel Prize winner
- Yuri Oganessian, nuclear physicist in the Joint Institute for Nuclear Research, co-discoverer of the heaviest elements in the periodic table; element Oganesson
- Vasily Petrov, discoverer of electric arc, proposed arc lamp and arc welding
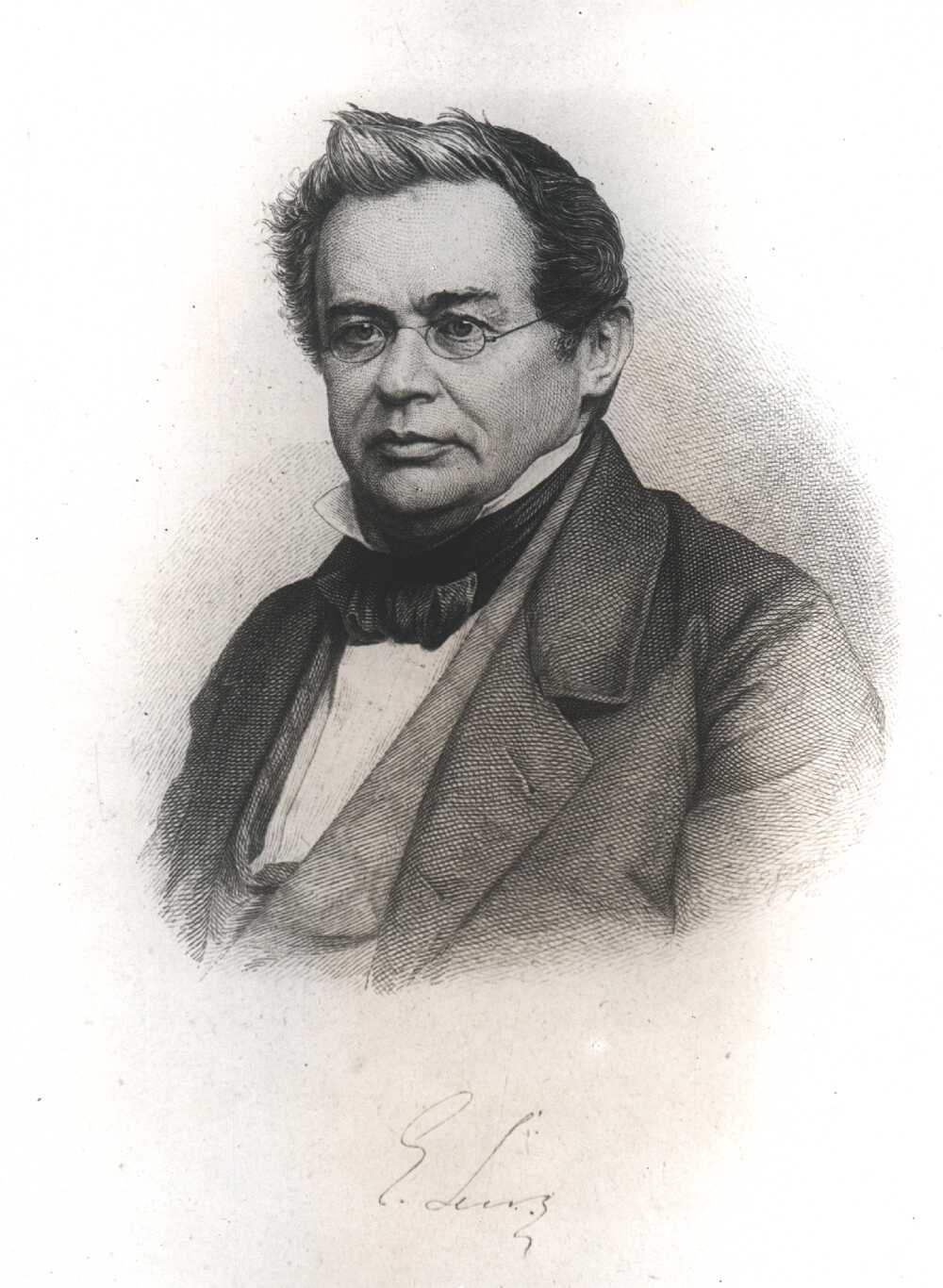
  Heinrich Lenz
- Boris Podolsky, an author of EPR Paradox in quantum physics
- Alexander Polyakov, developed the concepts of Polyakov action, 't Hooft–Polyakov monopole and BPST instanton
- Isaak Pomeranchuk, predicted synchrotron radiation
- Bruno Pontecorvo, a founder of neutrino high energy physics, whose work led to the discovery of PMNS matrix
- Alexander Popov, inventor of lightning detector, one of the inventors of radio, recorded the first experimental radiolocation at sea
- Victor Popov, co-discoverer of Faddeev–Popov ghosts in quantum field theory
- Alexander Prokhorov, co-inventor of laser and maser, Nobel Prize winner
- Georg Wilhelm Richmann, inventor of electrometer, pioneer researcher of atmospheric electricity, killed by a ball lightning in experiment
- Andrei Sakharov, co-developer of tokamak and the Tsar Bomb, inventor of explosively pumped flux compression generator, Nobel Peace Prize winner
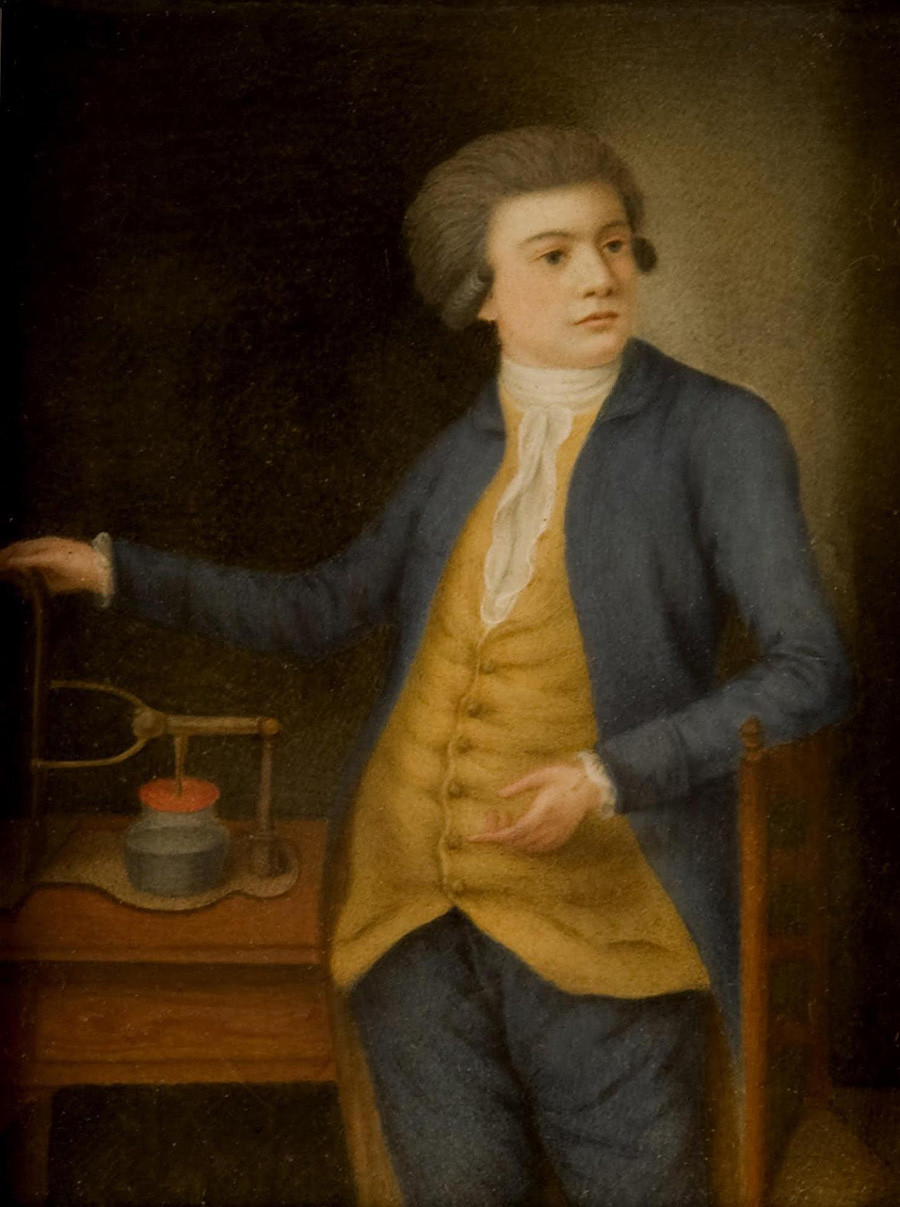
  Vasily Petrov
- Nikolay Semyonov, physical chemist, co-discovered a way to measure the magnetic field of an atomic nucleus, Nobel Prize in Chemistry winner
- Lev Shubnikov, discoverer of Shubnikov–de Haas effect, one of the first researchers of solid hydrogen and liquid helium
- Dmitri Skobeltsyn, first to use cloud chamber for studying cosmic rays, the first to observe positrons
- Aleksandr Stoletov, inventor of photoelectric cell, built the Stoletov curve, pioneered the research of ferromagnetism
- Igor Tamm, explained the phenomenon of Cherenkov radiation, co-developer of tokamak, Nobel Prize winner
- Nikolay Umov, discovered the Umov–Poynting vector and Umov effect, the first to propose the formula $E=kmc^2$
- Petr Ufimtsev, developed the theory that led to modern stealth technology
- Sergey Vavilov, co-discoverer of Cherenkov radiation, formulated the Kasha–Vavilov rule of quantum yields
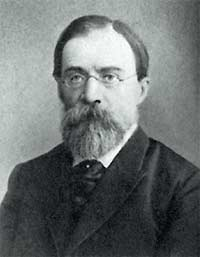
  Aleksandr Stoletov
- Vladimir Veksler, inventor of synchrophasotron, co-inventor of synchrotron
- Evgeny Velikhov, leader of the international program ITER (thermonuclear experimental tokamak)
- Alexey Yekimov, discoverer of quantum dots
- Yevgeny Zavoisky, inventor of EPR spectroscopy, co-developer of NMR spectroscopy
- Yakov Zeldovich, physicist and cosmologist, predicted the beta decay of a pi meson and the muon catalysis, co-predicted the Sunyaev–Zel'dovich effect of CMB distortion
- Nikolai Zhukovsky, a founder of aero- and hydrodynamics, the first to study airflow, author of Joukowsky transform and Kutta–Joukowski theorem, founder of TsAGI, pioneer of aviation

=== Chemists and material scientists ===
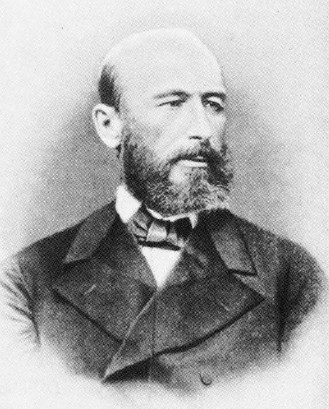
Aleksandr Butlerov

- Ernest Beaux, inventor of Chanel No. 5, "the world's most legendary fragrance"
- Nikolay Beketov, inventor of aluminothermy, a founder of physical chemistry
- Friedrich Konrad Beilstein, proposed the Beilstein test for halogen detection, compiled the Beilstein database in organic chemistry
- Boris Belousov, discoverer of Belousov–Zhabotinsky reaction, a classical example of non-equilibrium thermodynamics
- Alexander Borodin, chemist and composer, the author of the famous opera Prince Igor, discovered Borodin reaction, co-discovered Aldol reaction
- Aleksandr Butlerov, discovered hexamine, formaldehyde and formose reaction (the first synthesis of sugar), the first to incorporate double bonds into structural formulae, a founder of organic chemistry and the theory of chemical structure
- Dmitry Chernov, founder of modern metallography, discovered polymorphism in metals, built the iron–carbon phase diagram
- Aleksei Chichibabin, discovered Chichibabin pyridine synthesis, Bodroux-Chichibabin aldehyde synthesis and Chichibabin reaction
- Karl Ernst Claus, chemist and botanist, discoverer of ruthenium
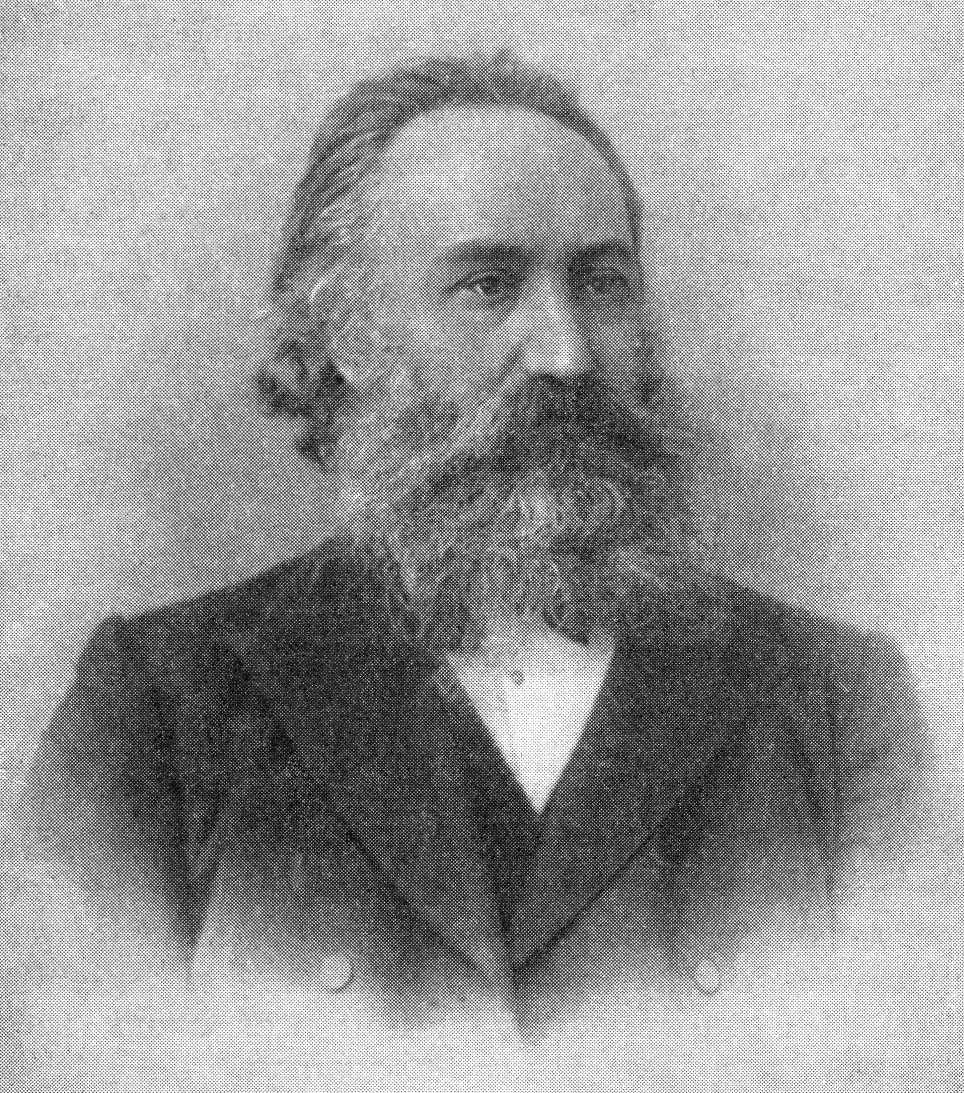
  Yevgraf Fyodorov
- Aleksandr Dianin, discovered Bisphenol A and Dianin's compound
- Constantin Fahlberg, inventor of saccharin, the first artificial sweetener
- Alexey Favorsky, discoverer of Favorskii rearrangement and Favorskii reaction in organic chemistry
- Alexander Frumkin, a founder of modern electrochemistry, author of the theory of electrode reactions
- Yevgraf Fyodorov, the first to enumerate all of the 230 space groups of crystals, thus founding the modern crystallography
- Andre Geim, inventor of graphene, developer of gecko tape, Nobel Prize in Physics winner
- Vladimir Ipatieff, inventor of Ipatieff bomb, a founder of petrochemistry
- Isidore, legendary inventor of Russian vodka
- Boris Jacobi, re-discovered and commercialized electroplating
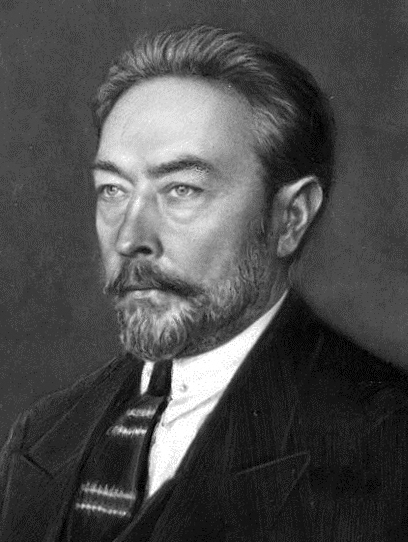
  Sergei Lebedev
- Pyotr Kapitsa, discovered superfluidity while studying liquid helium, Nobel Prize in Physics winner
- Gottlieb Kirchhoff, discoverer of glucose
- Ivan Knunyants, inventor of poly-caprolactam, a developer of Soviet chemical weapons
- Sergei Lebedev, inventor of polybutadiene, the first commercially viable synthetic rubber
- Mikhail Lomonosov, polymath, coined the term physical chemistry, re-discovered smalt, disproved the phlogiston theory, the first to record the freezing of mercury
- Aleksandr Loran, inventor of fire fighting foam
- Konstantin Novoselov, inventor of graphene, developer of gecko tape, Nobel Prize in Physics winner
- Vladimir Markovnikov, author of the Markovnikov's rule in organic chemistry, discoverer of naphthenes
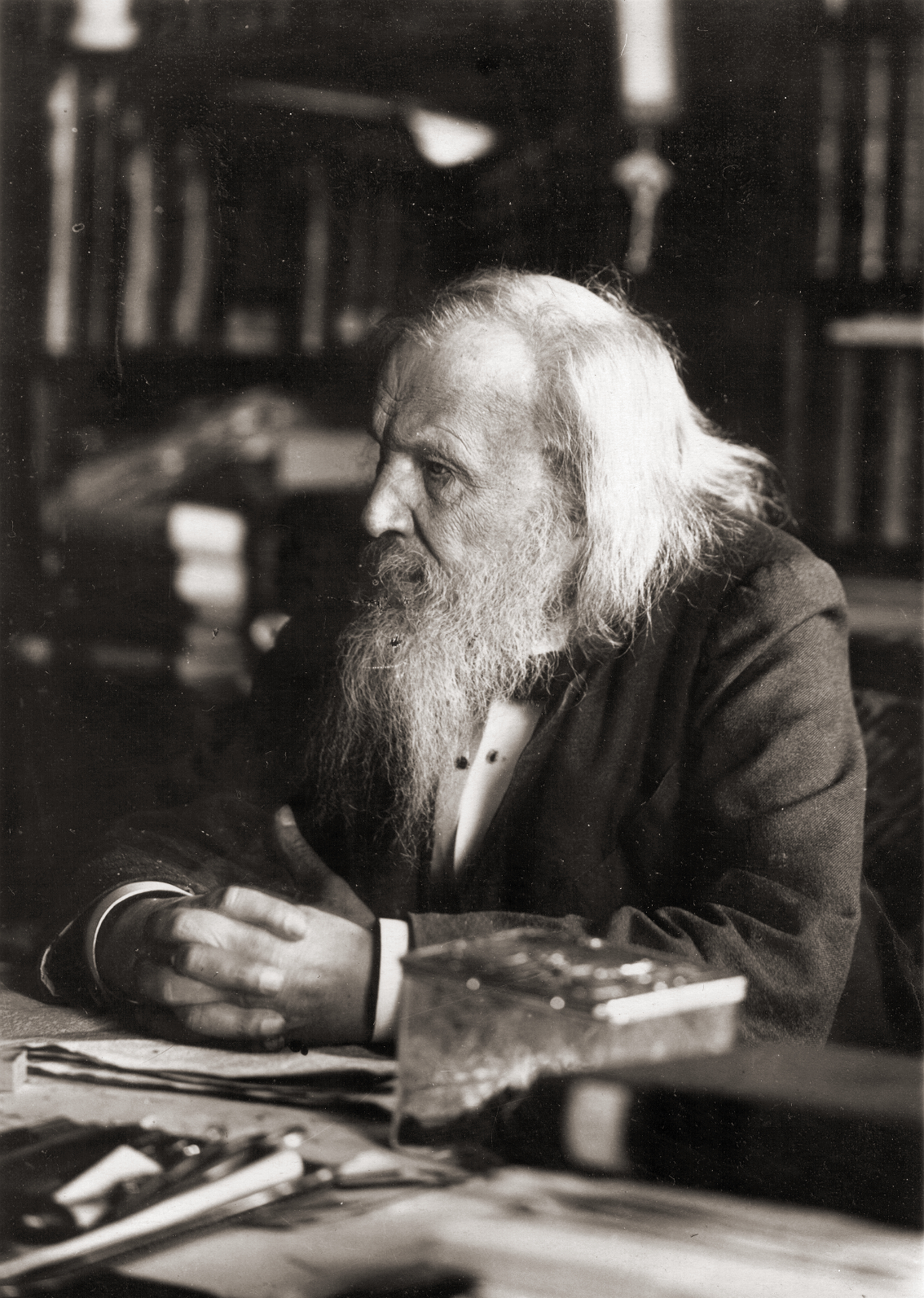
  Dmitri Mendeleyev
- Dmitri Mendeleyev, invented the Periodic table of chemical elements, the first to predict the properties of elements yet to be discovered, inventor of pyrocollodion, developer of pipelines and a prominent researcher of vodka
- Nikolai Menshutkin, discoverer of Menshutkin reaction in organic chemistry
- Ilya Prigogine, researcher of dissipative systems, complex systems and irreversibility, Nobel Prize winner
- Sergey Reformatsky, discoverer of the Reformatsky reaction in organic chemistry
- Nikolay Semyonov, physical chemist, author of the chain reaction theory, Nobel Prize winner
- Vladimir Shukhov, polymath, inventor of chemical cracking
- Mikhail Tsvet, botanist, inventor of chromatography
- Victor Veselago, the first researcher of materials with negative permittivity and permeability
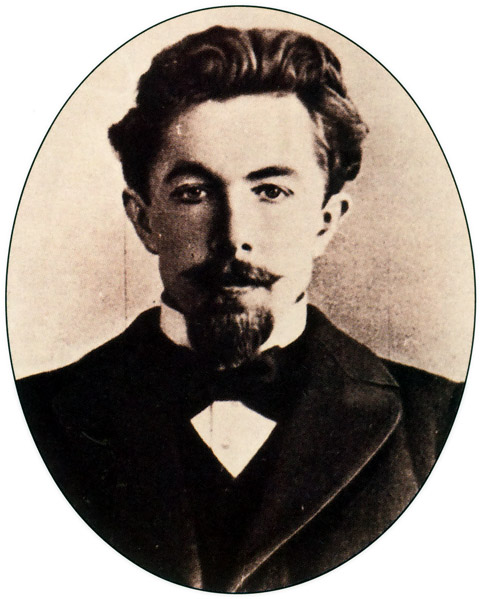
  Mikhail Tsvet
- Dmitry Vinogradov, inventor of the Russian porcelain
- Paul Walden, discovered the Walden inversion and ethylammonium nitrate, the first room temperature ionic liquid
- Alexander Zaytsev, author of the Zaitsev's rule in organic chemistry
- Nikolay Zelinsky, inventor of activated charcoal gas mask in Europe during World War I, co-discoverer of Hell-Volhard-Zelinsky halogenation, a founder of petrochemistry
- Nikolai Zinin, discovered benzidine, co-discovered aniline, the first President of the Russian Physical-Chemical Society

=== Philosophers ===
==== Modern ====
- Elena Oznobkina, researcher and translator of Kant, Nietzsche and Husserl, theorist and critic of Russian prison system, editor of Russian edition of Index on Censorship magazine, human rights activist

=== Orientalists ===
==== East Asian studies ====
- Eliahu Eilat (1903–1990), Israeli diplomat and president of the Hebrew University of Jerusalem
- Evgeny Torchinov, academic, researcher and translator of texts of Buddhism and Taoism into Russian; founder of Chair of Eastern Philosophy at St. Petersburg State University

== Art ==
=== Visual arts ===
==== Architects ====
- Aloisio da Milano, builder of the Kremlin towers and Terem Palace
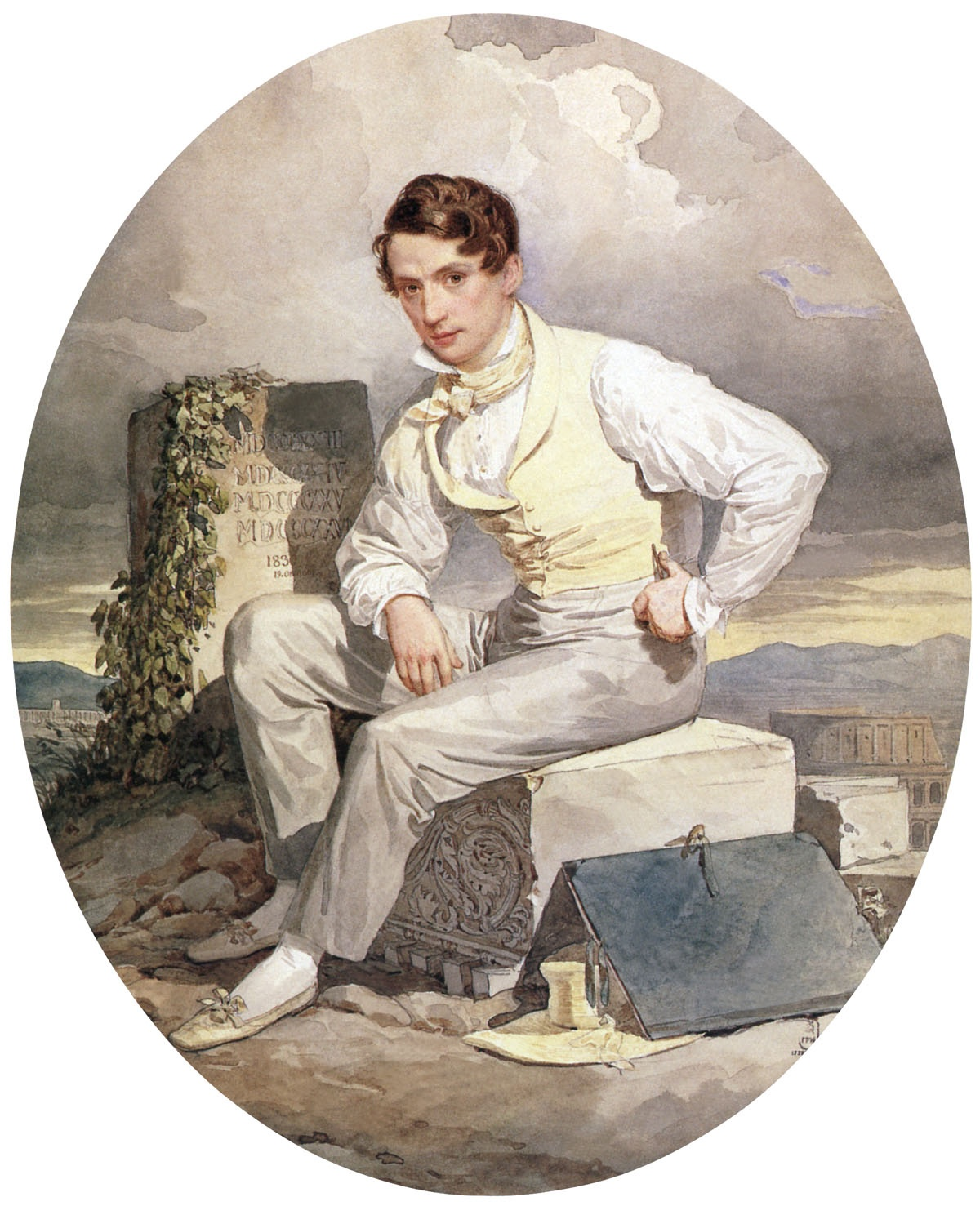
  Alexander Brullov
- Aloisio the New, builder of the Archangel Cathedral
- Gavriil Baranovsky, builder of Elisseeff Emporium and the Buddhist Temple in St Petersburg
- Vasily Bazhenov, architect of the Tsaritsyno Park and the Russian State Library
- Joseph Bové, chief architect of Moscow after the Fire of 1812
- Vincenzo Brenna, court architect of Paul I of Russia
- Alexander Brullov, builder of the Pulkovo Observatory
- Charles Cameron, architect of Tsarskoye Selo and Pavlovsk Palace
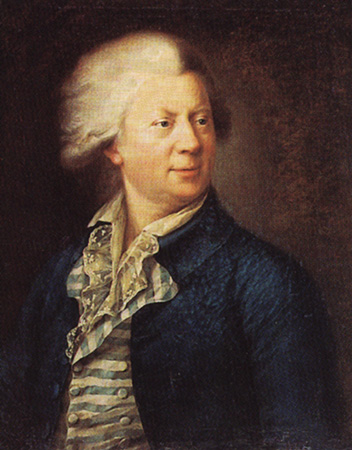
  Yury Felten
- Alberto Cavos, builder of the Bolshoi Theatre and the Mariinsky Theatre
- Alexey Dushkin, inventor of the first deep column station
- Yury Felten, mover of the Thunder Stone, maker of the Summer Garden grille, builder of St Petersburg embankments
- Aristotile Fioravanti, builder of the Dormition Cathedral in Moscow
- Ivan Fomin, master of Russian neoclassical revival and postconstructivism
- Moisei Ginzburg, master of Constructivist architecture, founder of the OSA Group
- David Grimm, builder of the Church of Maria Magdalene and Chersonesus Cathedral
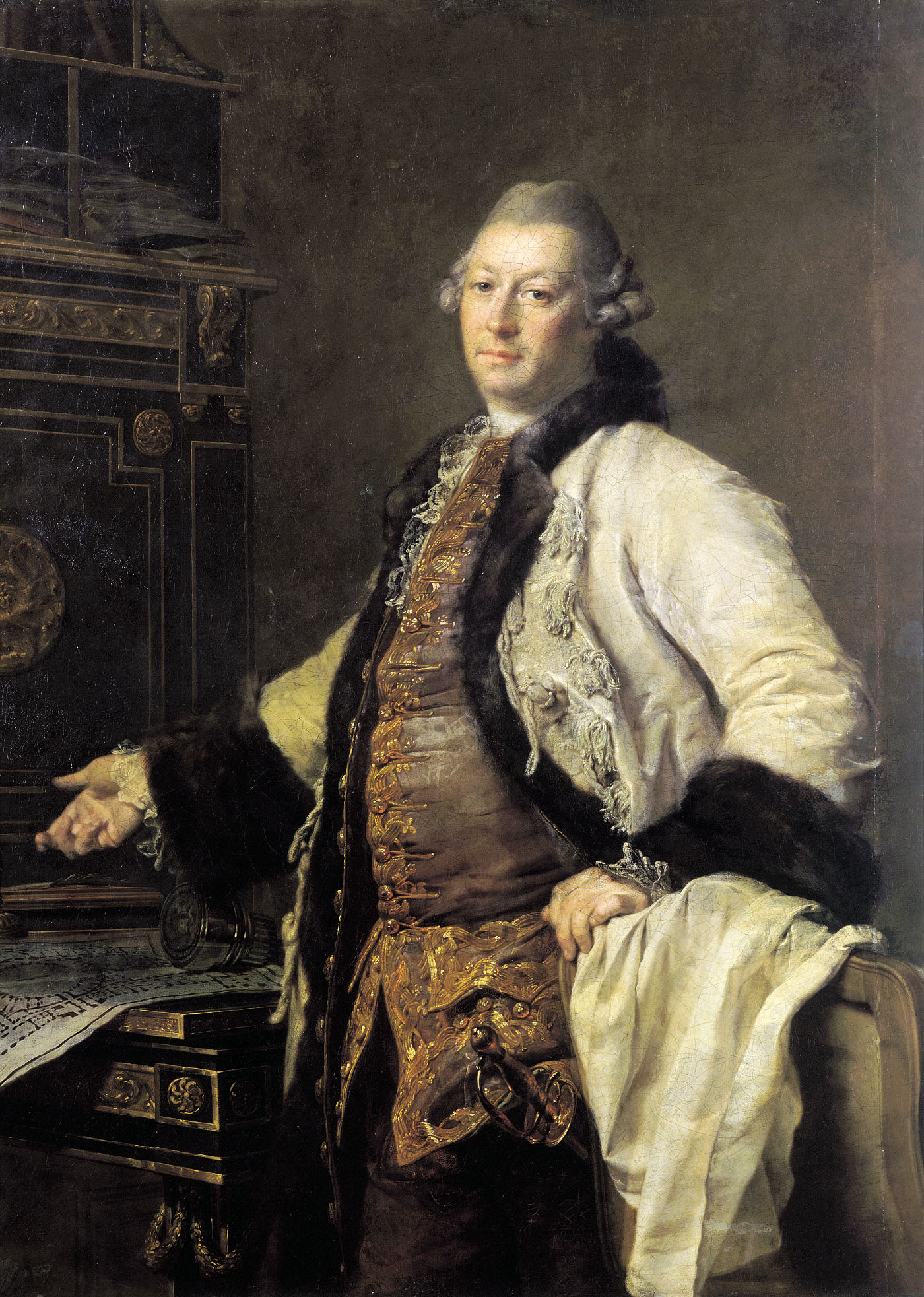
  Alexander Kokorinov
- Boris Iofan, grandmaster of Stalinist architecture
- Matvei Kazakov, builder of the Kremlin Senate
- Roman Klein, builder of the Pushkin Museum and TsUM
- Alexander Kokorinov, builder of the Imperial Academy of Arts
- Fyodor Kon, builder of the Smolensk Kremlin and Moscow's Bely Gorod
- Nikolai Ladovsky, leader of rationalist architecture of ASNOVA
- Nikolay Lvov, polymath scientist and artist, adapted rammed earth technology for northern climate, pioneered HVAC technology, built Priory Palace in Gatchina
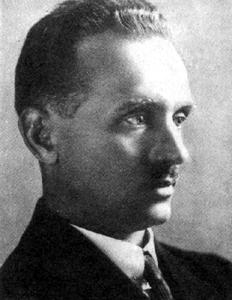
  Konstantin Melnikov
- Georg Johann Mattarnovy, architect of Kunstkamera
- Auguste de Montferrand, builder of Saint Isaac's Cathedral and the Alexander Column
- Arkady Mordvinov, architect of the tallest hotel in Europe
- Nikolai Nikitin, engineer of the largest Soviet structures: Moscow State University, Luzhniki Stadium, The Motherland Calls and Ostankino Tower (once the world's tallest)
- Vyacheslav Oltarzhevsky, architect of the All-Russia Exhibition Centre and Hotel Ukraina (Moscow)

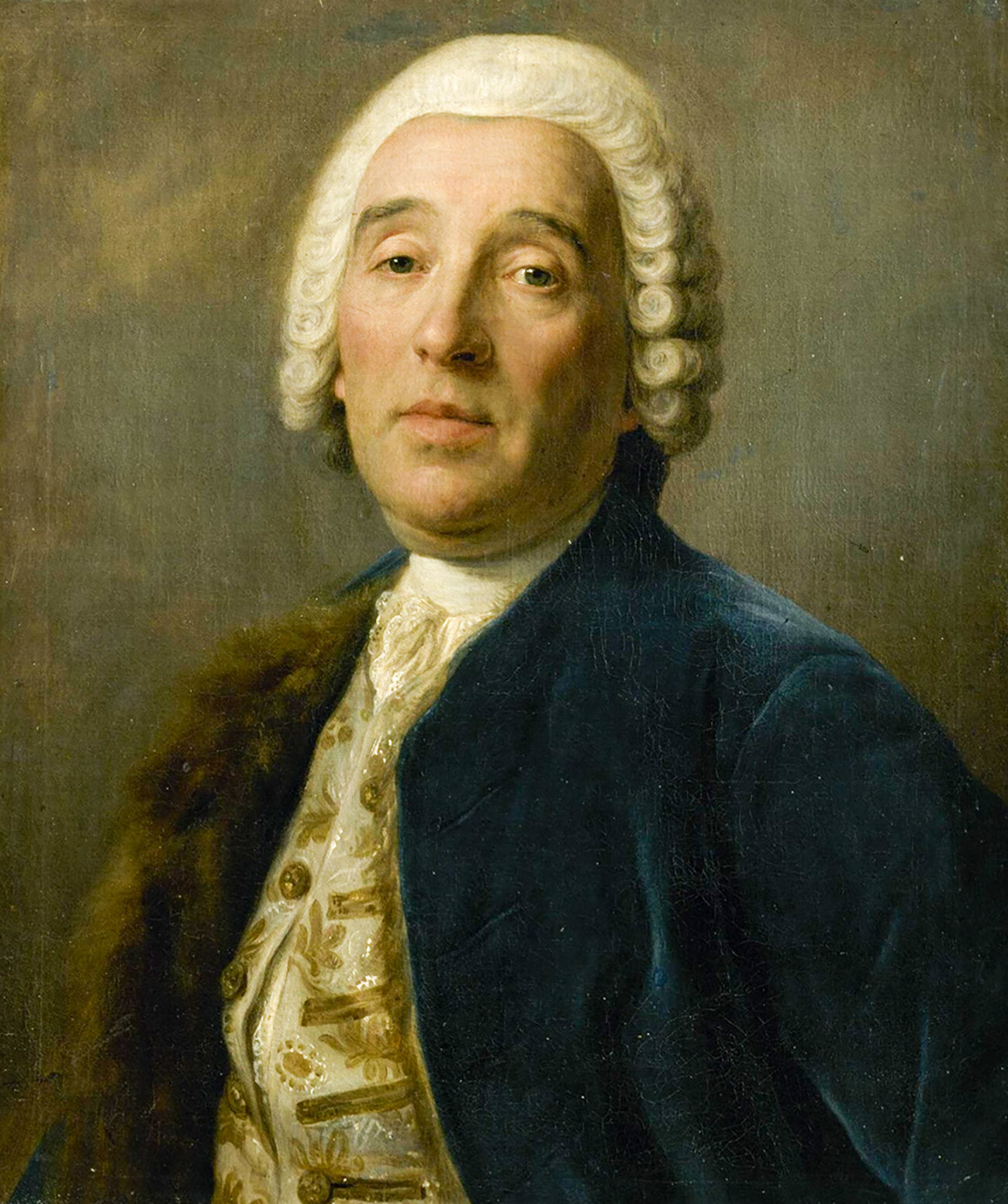
Bartolomeo Rastrelli

- Petrok Maly, builder of the Kitai-gorod Wall and the Ascension Church in Kolomenskoye
- Anatoly Polyansky, architect of the Museum of the Great Patriotic War, Moscow
- Alexander Pomerantsev, builder of the GUM and the Alexander Nevsky Cathedral, Sofia
- Giacomo Quarenghi, builder of the Hermitage Theatre and Smolny Institute
- Bartolomeo Rastrelli, grandmaster of Russian baroque, builder of Peterhof Palace, Saint Andrew's Church in Kiev, Smolny Convent, Catherine Palace, Winter Palace
- Antonio Rinaldi, architect of Oranienbaum and Tsarskoye Selo, builder of the Marble Palace
- Carlo Rossi, architect of the neoclassical ensembles of St Petersburg, author of the Russian Museum, Alexandrinsky Theater, General Staff Building in St. Petersburg
- Lev Rudnev, builder of Stalinist skyscrapers
- Marco Ruffo, builder of Kremlin towers and the Palace of Facets
- Fyodor Schechtel, master of Art Nouveau, builder of Yaroslavsky Rail Terminal
- Vladimir Shchuko, builder of the Lenin Library, master of Stalinist architecture
- Aleksey Shchusev, builder of Lenin's Mausoleum on Red Square and the Hotel Moskva (Moscow)
- Vladimir Sherwood, builder of the State Historical Museum
- Vladimir Shukhov, engineer-polymath, inventor of breakthrough industrial designs( hyperboloid structure, thin-shell structure, tensile structure, gridshell), builder of Shukhov Towers and multiple other structures
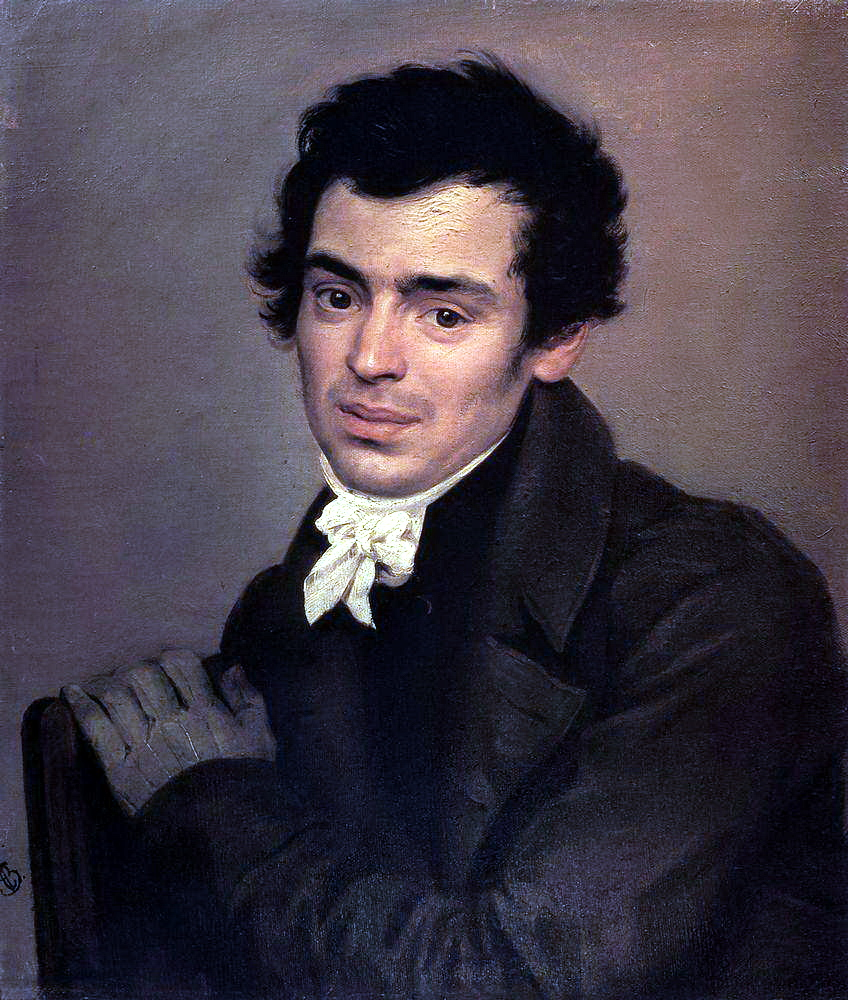
  Konstantin Thon
- Pietro Antonio Solari, builder of the Spasskaya tower and the Palace of Facets
- Vasily Stasov, inventor of the Russian Revival style, builder of the Moscow Triumphal Gates and Narva Triumphal Gates
- Andrei Stackenschneider, builder of the Mariinsky Palace and Beloselsky-Belozersky Palace
- Ivan Starov, builder of the Tauride Palace
- Vladimir Tatlin, author of Tatlin's Tower project
- Konstantin Thon, builder of the Grand Kremlin Palace, Kremlin Armoury and the Cathedral of Christ the Saviour (the world's tallest Orthodox church)
- Domenico Trezzini, the first architect of St Petersburg, builder of the Peter and Paul Fortress, Summer Palace of Peter the Great, Twelve Collegia and Peter and Paul Cathedral (the world's tallest Orthodox belltower)
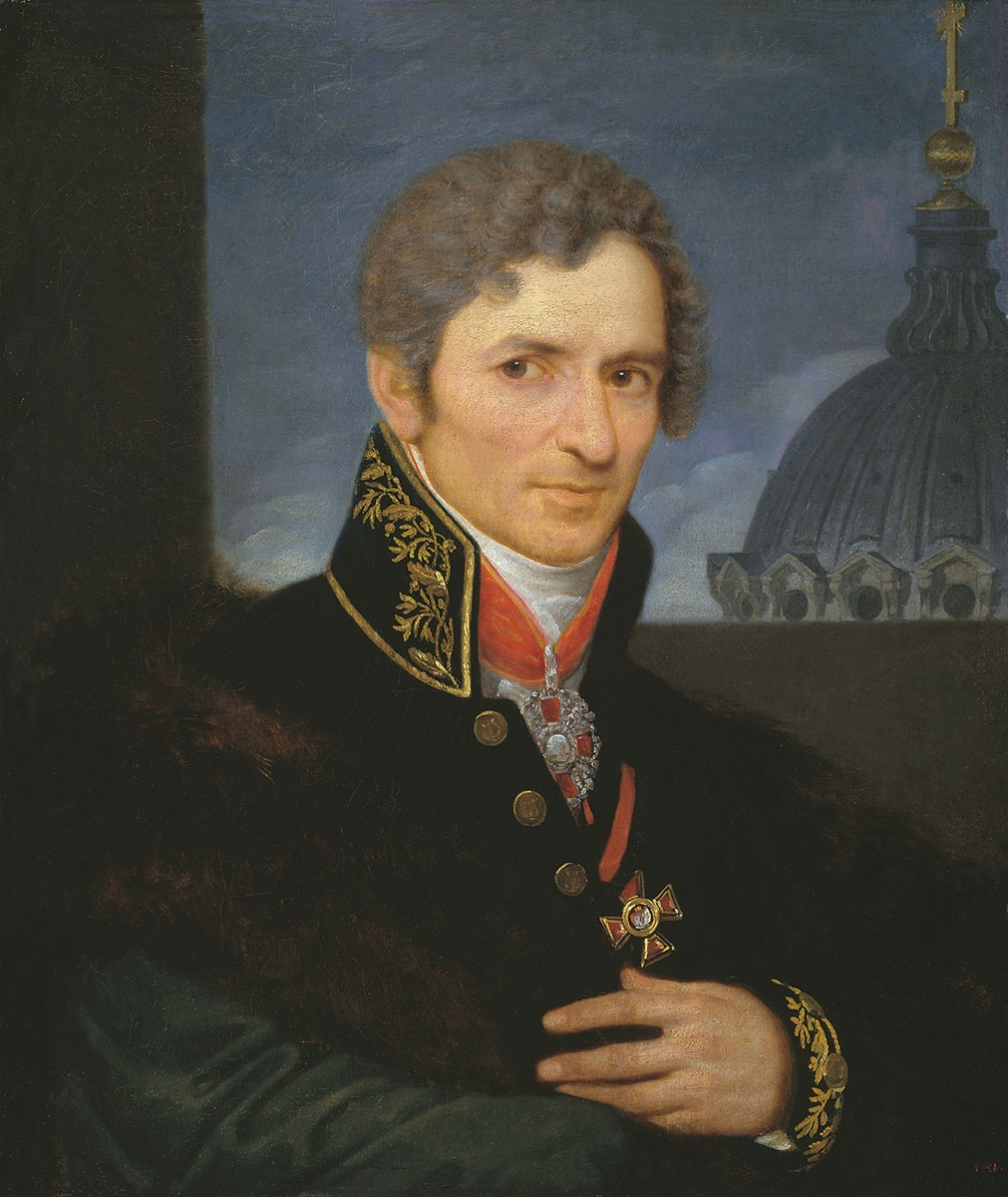
  Andrey Voronikhin
- Vesnin brothers, leaders of constructivist architecture
- Andrey Voronikhin, builder of the Kazan Cathedral and Saint Petersburg Mining Institute
- Postnik Yakovlev, builder of Saint Basil's Cathedral on Red Square
- Andreyan Zakharov, builder of the Russian Admiralty
- Mikhail Zemtsov, architect of Catherinethal
- Pyotr Baranovsky, preservationist of ancient Russian architecture, notable for saving Saint Basil's Cathedral from destruction by the Soviet authorities in the 1930s.

==== Sculptors and jewellers ====
- Mikhail Anikushin, monumentalist, author of celebrated statues of Pushkin
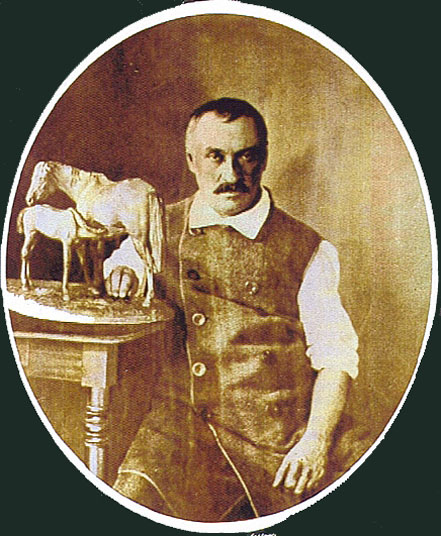
  Peter Clodt
- Mihail Chemiakin, author of Children Are the Victims of Adult Vices
- Peter Clodt, famous for equestrian statues, author of the Anichkov Bridge Horse Tamers
- Vasily Demut-Malinovsky, author of the chariot groups on the Narva Triumphal Gates and the General Staff Building in St. Petersburg
- Peter Carl Fabergé, jeweller, creator of the Fabergé Eggs
- Naum Gabo, sculptor, pioneer of kinetic art
- Mikhail Gerasimov, forensic sculptor, reconstructed the appearance of Tamerlane, Yaroslav the Wise, Rudaki and many other historical figures
- Ilya Kabakov, conceptual installation artist
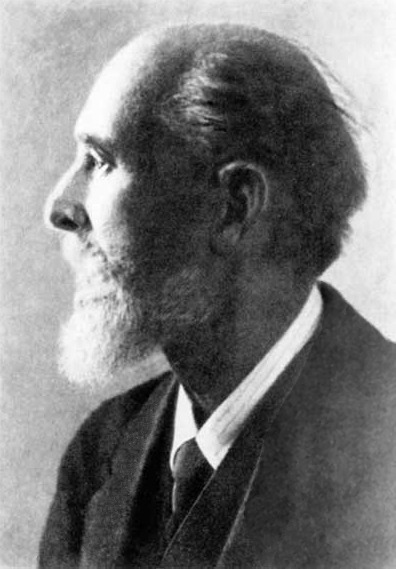
  Peter Carl Fabergé
- Vyacheslav Klykov, author of the monuments to Marshal Zhukov, Saints Cyril and Methodius, the Battle of Kursk
- Sergey Konenkov, sculptor, "the Russian Rodin"
- Mikhail Kozlovsky, neoclassical sculptor, author of the Samson fountain in Peterhof and monument to Suvorov the Mars
- Ivan Martos, author of the Monument to Minin and Pozharsky on Red Square
- Mikhail Mikeshin, author of the Millennium of Russia, the monument to Catherine II in St Petersburg, the monument to Bohdan Khmelnytsky in Kyiv
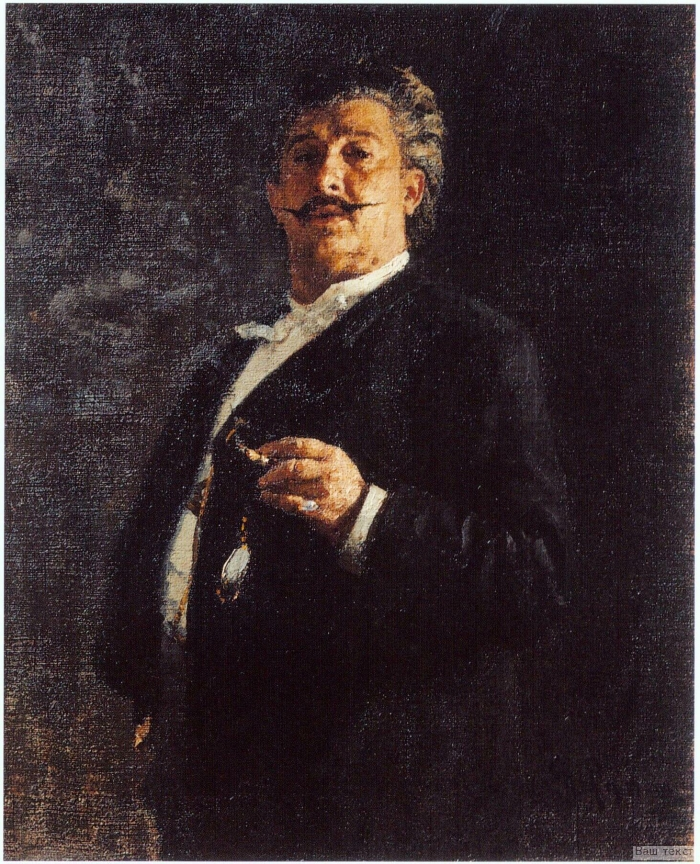
  Mikhail Mikeshin
- Vera Mukhina, sculptor, inventor of welded sculpture, author of the Worker and Kolkhoz Woman
- Andrei Molodkin (born 1966), sculpture and installation
- Ernst Neizvestny, author of the Lotus Flower at the Aswan Dam in Egypt
- Alexander Opekushin, author of early monuments to Pushkin, Lermontov, Aleksandr II
- Boris Orlovsky, author of the statues of Kutuzov and Barclay de Tolly in front of Kazan Cathedral, St. Petersburg
- Avenir Sumin, competitor of Fabergé
- Nikolai Tomsky, author of multiple Lenin statues and the Tomb of the Unknown Soldier (Moscow)
- Zurab Tsereteli, author of the Peter the Great Statue, To the Struggle Against World Terrorism, St. George statues at the Moscow War Memorial and the Freedom Monument (Tbilisi)
- Yevgeny Vuchetich, author of the Soviet War Memorial in Berlin, Let Us Beat Swords into Plowshares in the New York UN garden, and The Motherland Calls in Volgograd

==== Painters ====
- Ivan Aivazovsky, author of The Ninth Wave and over 6000 paintings, mostly seascapes
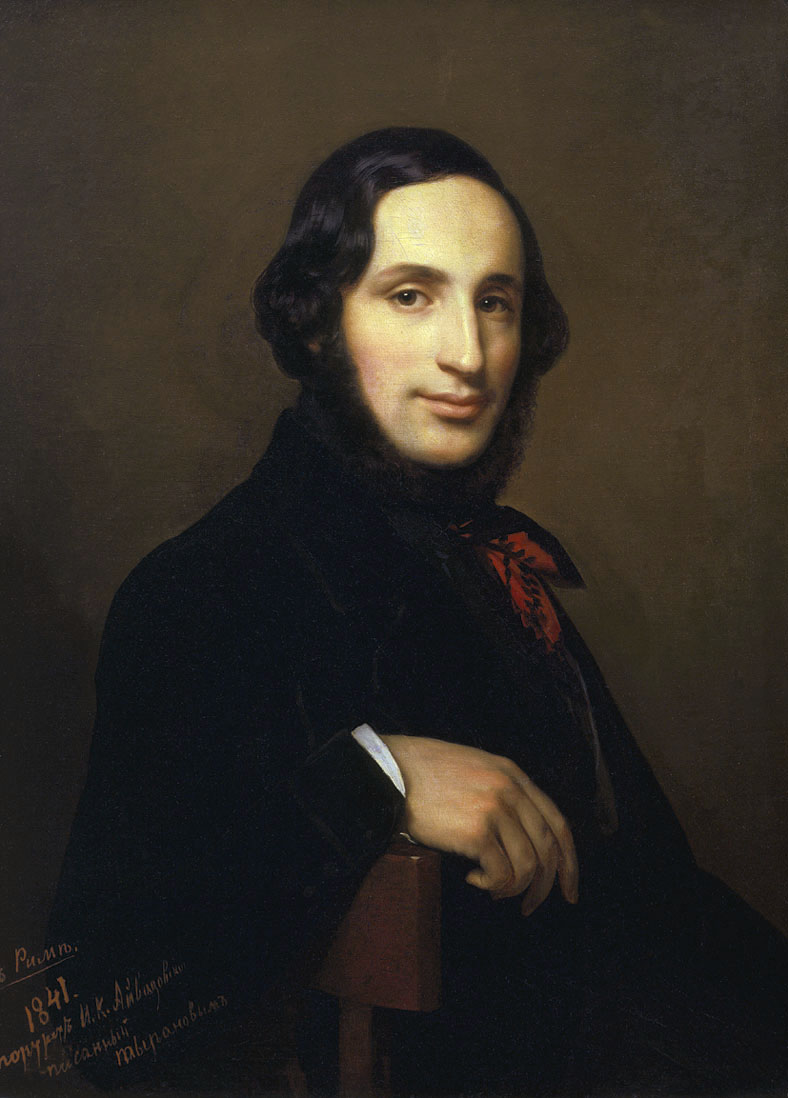
  Ivan Aivazovsky
- Fyodor Alekseyev, prominent landscapist, "the Russian Canaletto"
- Ivan Argunov, major 18th-century portraitist
- Léon Bakst, stage and costume designer for the Ballets Russes, author of the Terror Antiquus
- Alexandre Benois, artist and art critic, influential stage designer, author of the celebrated illustrations to Pushkin's Bronze Horseman
- Ivan Bilibin, painter and stage designer, famous for illustrations of Slavic mythology and sets for Russian fairy tale-based Russian operas
- Alexey Bogolyubov, landscape and seascape painter
- Victor Borisov-Musatov, Post-Impressionist painter, creator of Russian Symbolism
- Vladimir Borovikovsky, famous portraitist at the turn of the 19th century

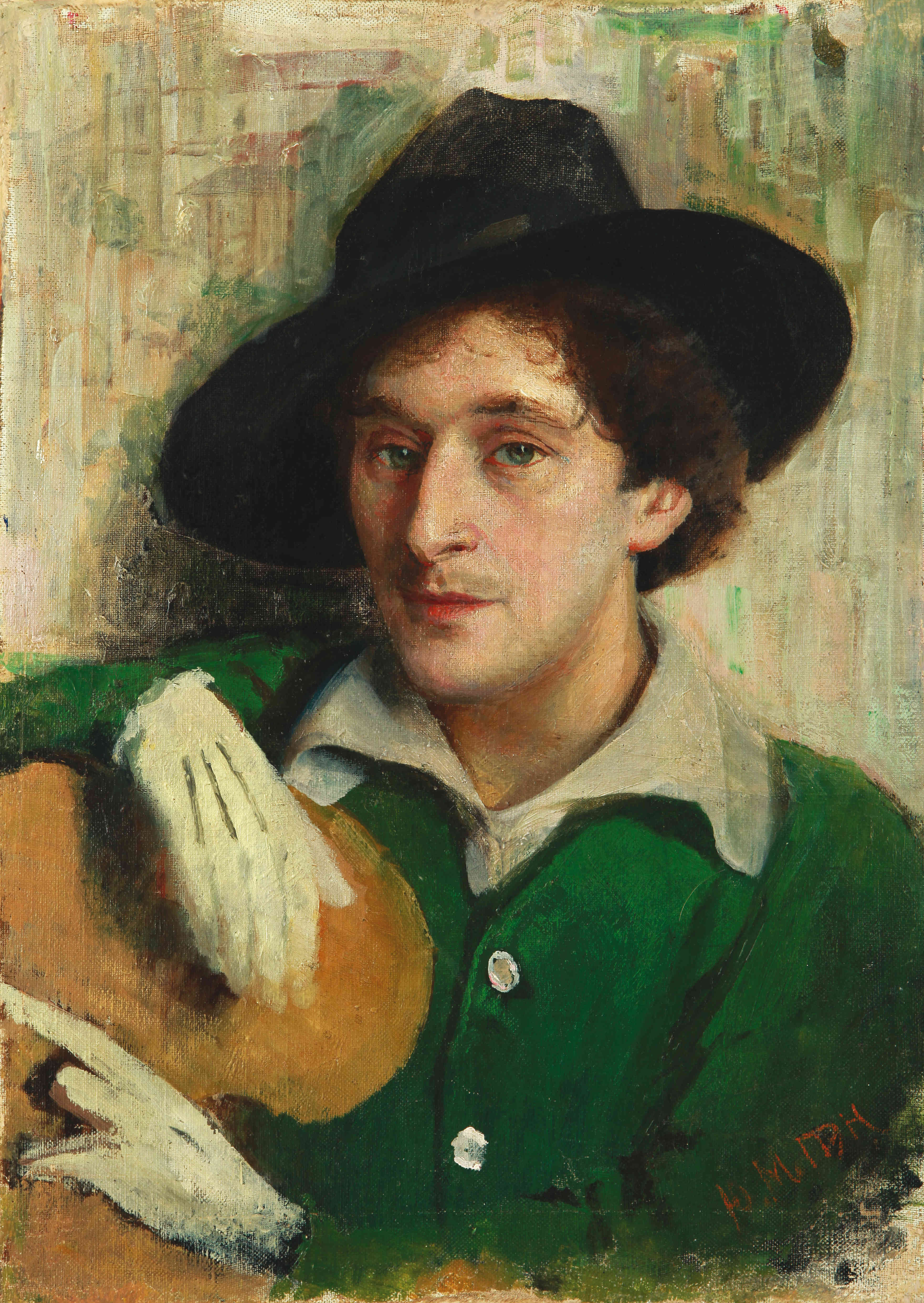
Marc Chagall

- Karl Briullov, neoclassical painter, author of The Last Day of Pompeii
- Marc Chagall, polymath-artist, pioneer of modernism and figurative art, author of famous stained glasses
- Pavel Chistyakov, history and portrait painter, tutor of many celebrated artists
- Alexander Deyneka, master of socialist realism, author of the mosaics at Mayakovskaya (Moscow Metro)
- Dionisy, medieval icon painter, frescoes in the Ferapontov Monastery
- Julia Dolgorukova, painter, landscapist, famous for works on stage, costume designer and new synthetic technologies in painting
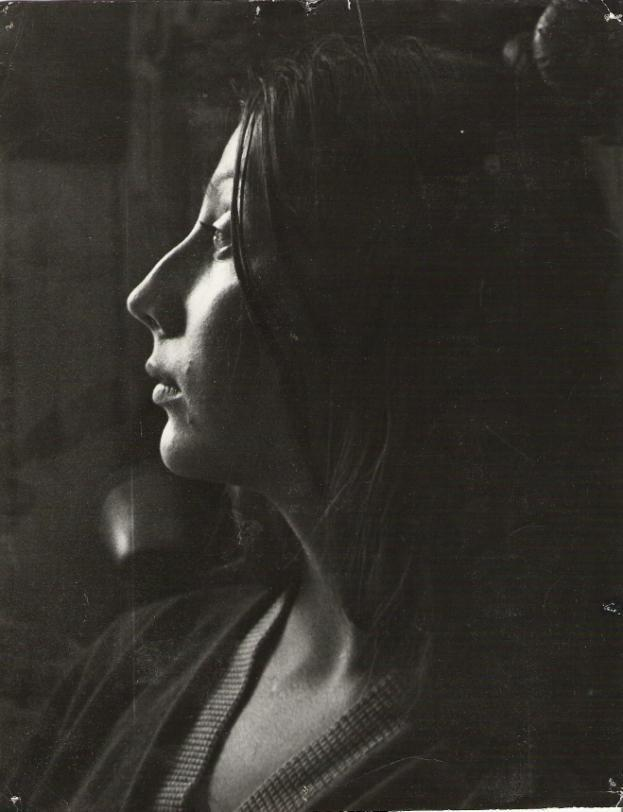
  Julia Dolgorukova
- Andrey Esionov, painter
- Vladimir Favorsky, graphic artist, famous for woodcut illustrations of classic books
- Pavel Fedotov, realist painter, "the Russian Hogarth"
- Nikolai Ge, realist painter, famous for works on historical and religious motifs
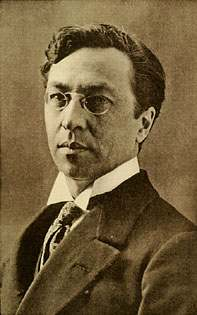
  Wassily Kandinsky
- Feofan Grek, medieval fresco and icon-painter in Byzantine Empire and Russia
- Alexander Ivanov, neoclassical painter, author of The Appearance of Christ before the People
- Sergey Ivanov, author of famous illustrations of Russian history
- Wassily Kandinsky, inventor of pure abstract art, founder of Der Blaue Reiter
- Orest Kiprensky, romantic painter and portraitist
- Konstantin Korovin, leading Russian Impressionist painter
- Ivan Kramskoi, painter and art critic, author of the Christ in the Desert and the Unknown Woman
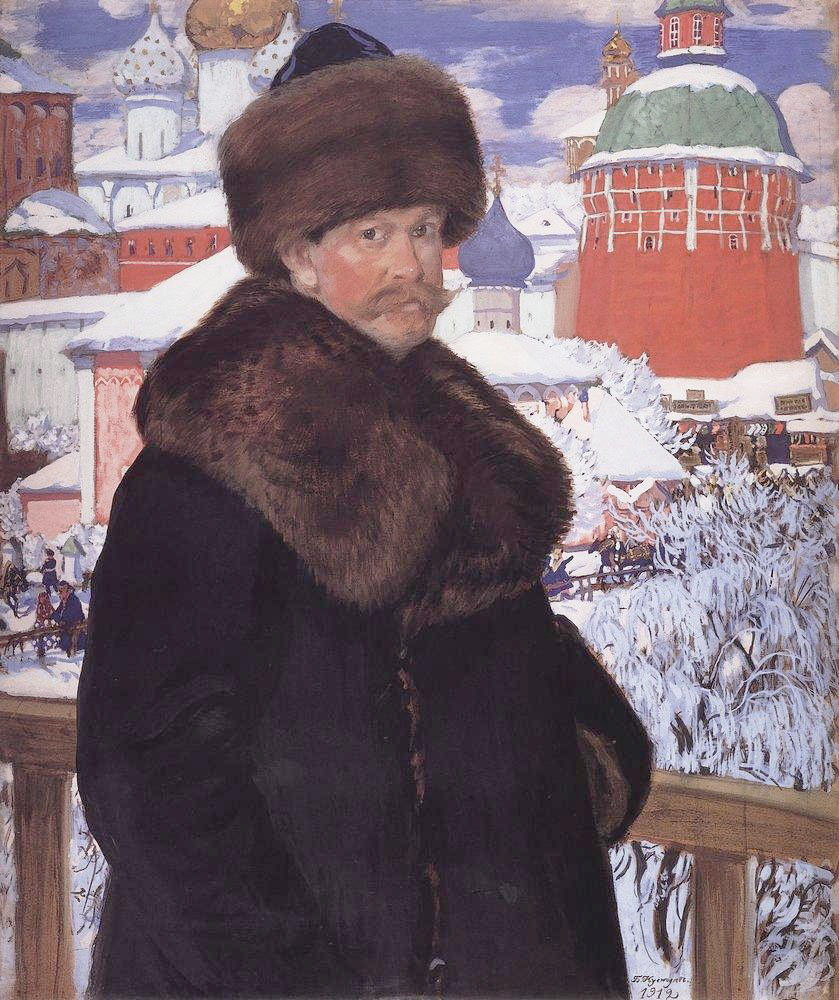
  Boris Kustodiev
- Boris Kustodiev, author of famous portraits, holiday scenes and "Kustodiev's women" (The Merchant's Wife, Bathing, The Russian Venus)
- Mikhail Larionov, avant-garde painter, inventor of rayonism
- Alexei Leonov, cosmonaut and painter, made some of his works in outer space
- Isaac Levitan, landscapist, author of the Over Eternal Peace
- Rafail Sergeevich Levitsky, Peredvizhniki artist and court photographer to the Romanov dynasty
- El Lissitzky, avant-garde painter, typographer, author of Beat the Whites with the Red Wedge
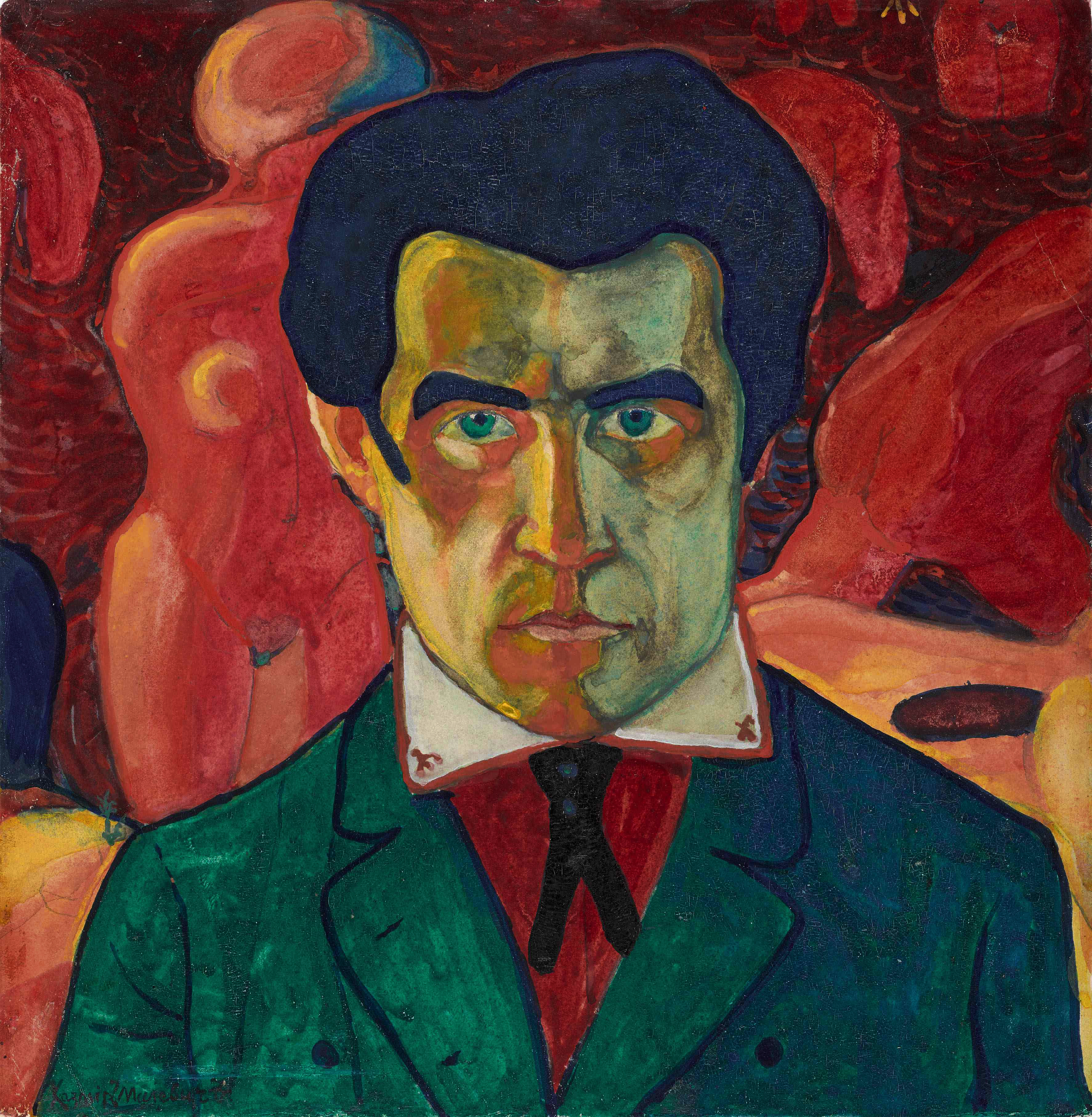
  Kazimir Malevich
- Konstantin Makovsky, famous for idealized history paintings
- Kazimir Malevich, inventor of suprematism, author of the Black Square
- Sergey Malyutin, painter and folk artist, designed the first matryoshka doll
- Vladimir Mayakovsky, futurist poet and propaganda artist, author of the Rosta Windows agitprop
- Sergey Miloradovich, historical painter
- Mikhail Nesterov, religious symbolist painter, portraitist, author of The Vision of the Youth Bartholomew
- Ivan Nikitin, famous Petrine era portraitist
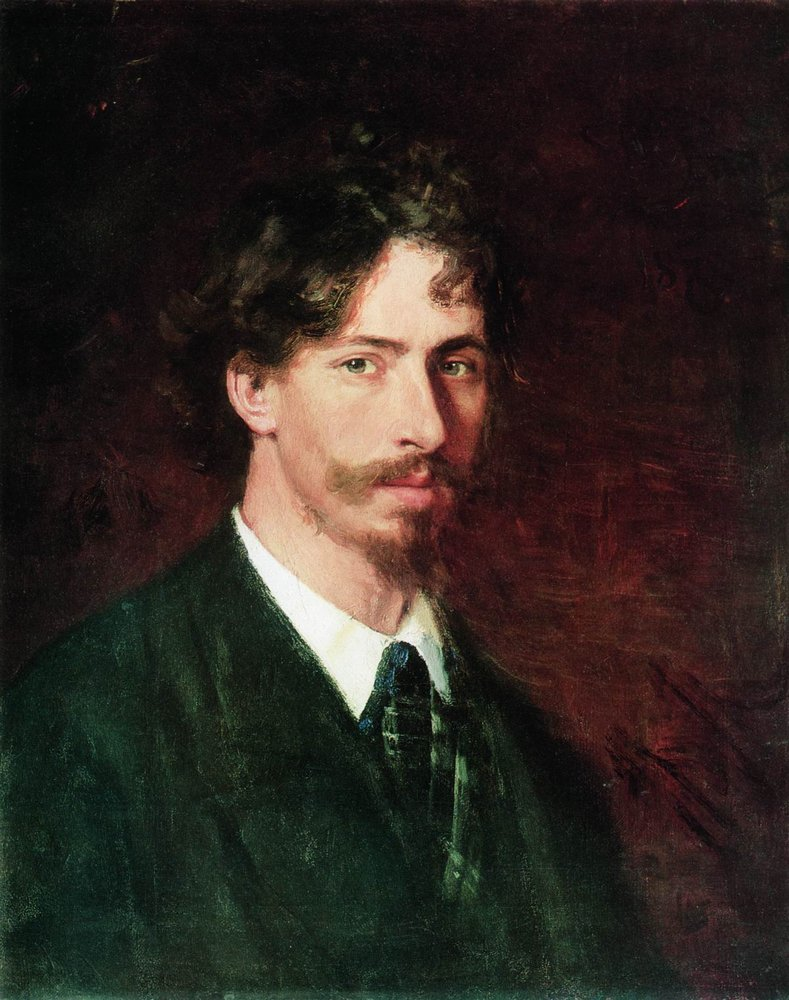
  Ilya Repin
- Vasily Perov, realist painter, author of the Troika and The Hunters at Rest
- Kuzma Petrov-Vodkin, symbolist painter, author of the Bathing of a Red Horse
- Vasily Polenov, landscape painter, author of A courtyard in Moscow and Grandma's garden
- Ilya Repin, archetypical Russian painter, famous for his portraits and history scenes, author of the Barge Haulers on the Volga and the Reply of the Zaporozhian Cossacks
- Alexander Rodchenko, avant-garde artist, graphic designer and constructivist painter
- Nicholas Roerich, artist, scientist, traveler, public figure, initiator of the international Roerich Pact, author of over 7000 paintings
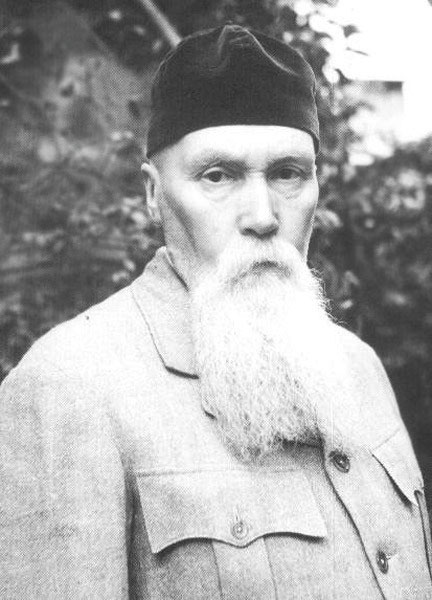
  Nicholas Roerich
- Andrei Rublev, most famous Russian icon-painter, author of the Trinity
- Andrei Ryabushkin, history painter, works devoted mostly to 17th-century Russia
- Alexei Savrasov, landscape painter, creator of the lyrical landscape style
- Zinaida Serebriakova, the most prolific woman painter of Russia, famous for female portraits and nudes
- Valentin Serov, impressionist painter, portraitist, author of The Girl with Peaches and The Kidnapping of Europe
- Taras Shevchenko, romantic poet and painter
- Ivan Shishkin, author of the most celebrated Russian landscapes: the Morning in a Pine Forest, Rye Fields, the Rain in an Oak Forest
- Konstantin Somov, prominent Russian literature illustrator
- Vasily Surikov, author the famous Russian history paintings The Morning of Streltsy's Execution, Boyarynya Morozova, The March of Suvorov through the Alps
- Vasily Tropinin, romantic and realist portraitist
- Israel Tsvaygenbaum, painter
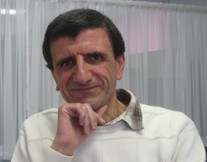
  Israel Tsvaygenbaum
- Simon Ushakov, prolific late 17th-century icon painter, Saviour Not Made by Hands
- Feodor Vasilyev, lyrical landscape painter
- Apollinary Vasnetsov, Russian history illustrator, many works devoted to Moscow
- Viktor Vasnetsov, famous for Russian history and Slavic mythology images, inventor of budenovka, author of the Flying Carpet, Tsar Ivan The Terrible, the Bogatyrs
- Alexey Venetsianov, prominent genre painter, founder of the "Venetsianov school"
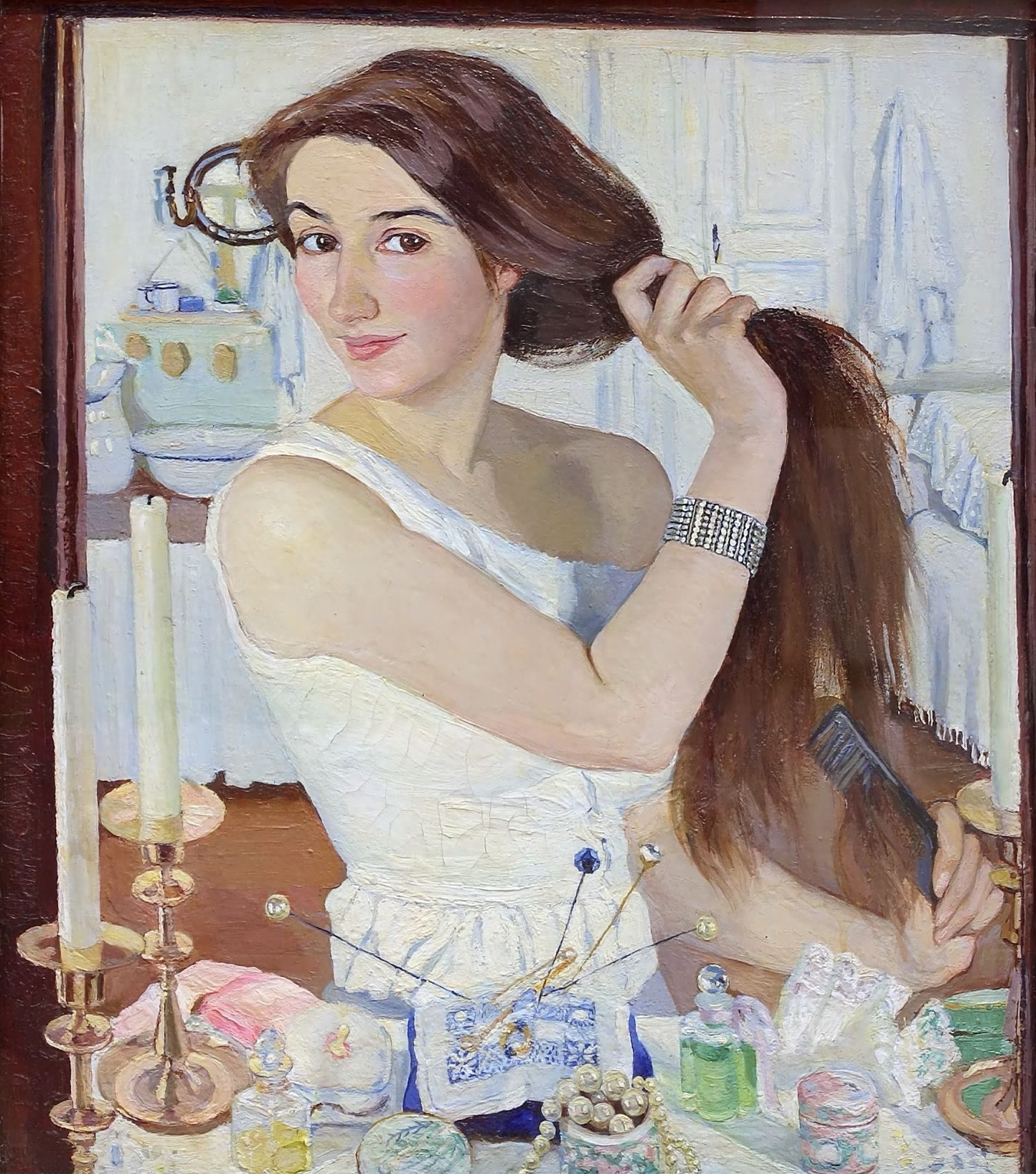
  Zinaida Serebriakova
- Vasily Vereshchagin, battle painter, author of The Apotheosis of War and the Blowing from Guns in British India
- Romanov Viktor (born 1959), painter
- Mikhail Vrubel, leader of the Russian Symbolism, author of The Demon Sitting and The Swan Princess
- Nikolai Yaroshenko, realist genre painter and portraitist
- Pyotr Zakharov-Chechenets, portrait painter of Chechen origin
- Leon Zernitsky, illustrator and artist
- Karp Zolotaryov, late 17th-century icon painter, notable for realistic style

=== Literature ===
==== Novel and short story authors ====
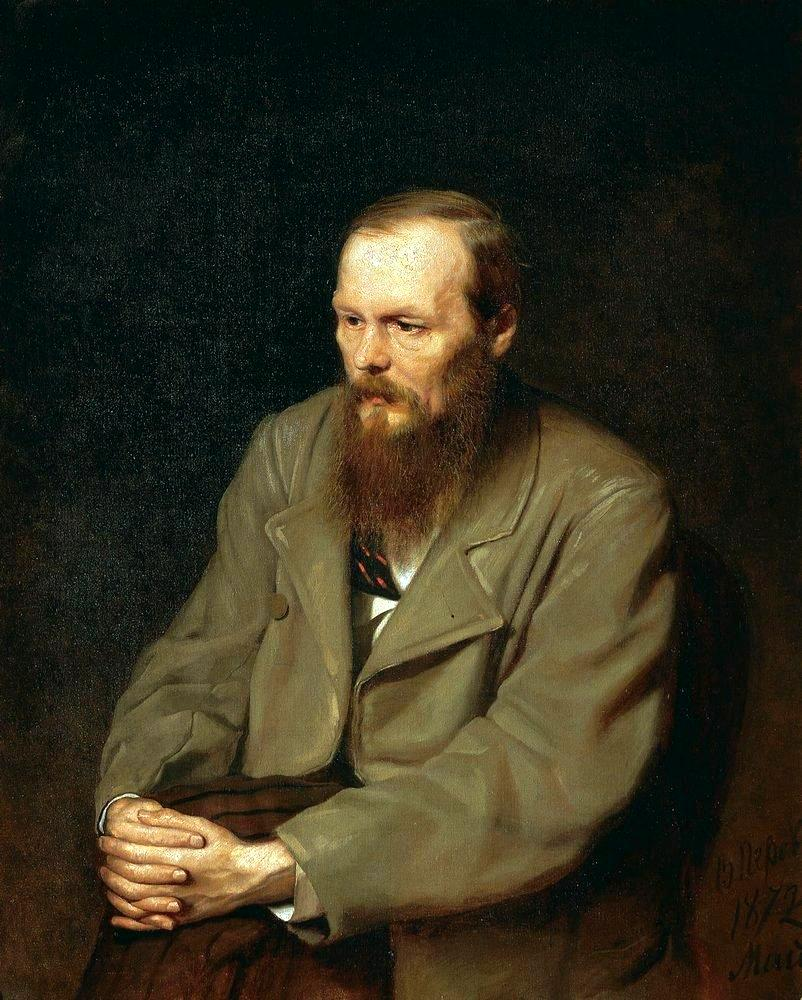
Fyodor Dostoevsky

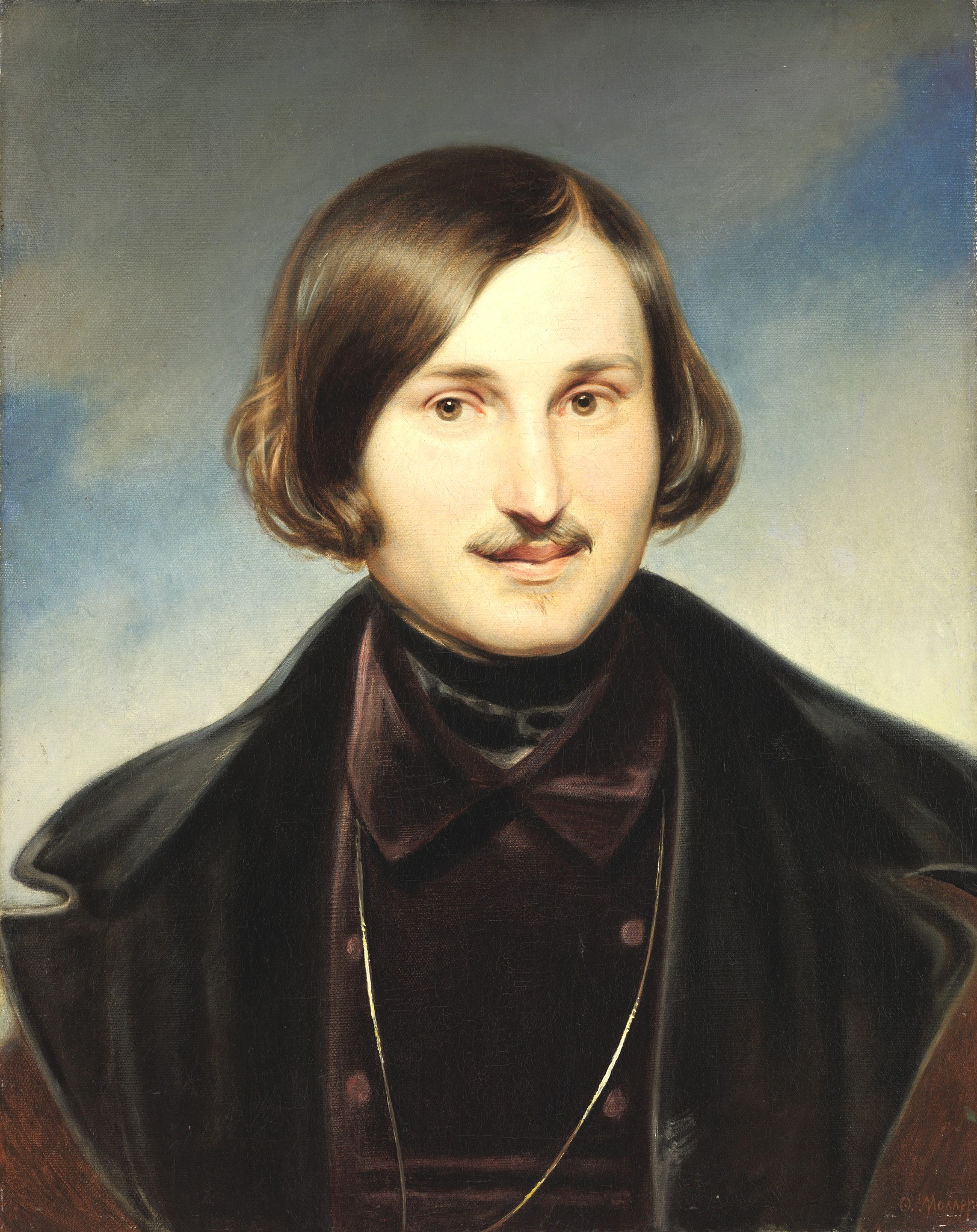
Nikolai Gogol

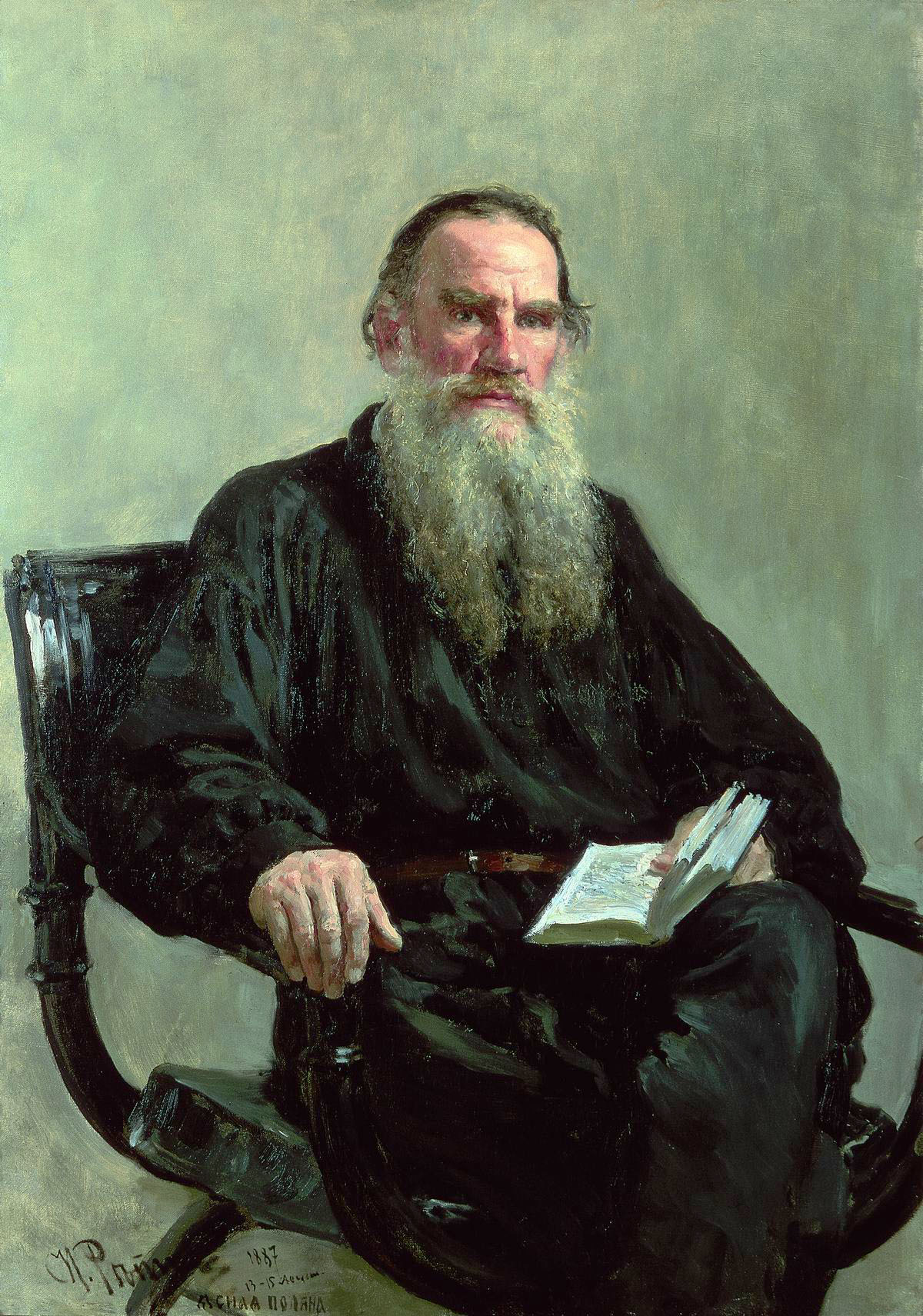
Leo Tolstoy

- Chinghiz Aitmatov, Kyrgyz and Russian writer, author of Jamilya
- Vasily Aksyonov, author of the Moscow saga Generations of Winter
- Boris Akunin, famous for his detective fiction, author of The Diamond Chariot
- Sholem Aleichem, important Russian Jewish writer, the famous musical Fiddler on the Roof was based on Aleichem's story Tevye the Dairyman
- Isaac Babel, well-known Russian Jewish writer, author of The Odessa Tales
- Andrei Bely, author of the novel Petersburg, poet
- Alexander Belyayev, major science fiction writer, author of Amphibian Man and Ariel
- Valery Bryusov, important symbolist writer, author of the novel The Fiery Angel
- Mikhail Bulgakov, author of The Master and Margarita, which The Times of London has called one of the masterpieces of the 20th century
- Kir Bulychev, author of the science fiction anthology Half a Life
- Ivan Bunin, short story writer and poet, first Russian to be awarded the Nobel Prize for Literature
- Anton Chekhov, famous for his short stories and plays; author of The Lady with the Dog, The Black Monk
- Nikolai Chernyshevsky, influential revolutionary writer, author of What Is to Be Done?
- Fyodor Dostoevsky, author of Crime and Punishment, The Idiot, The Possessed, The Brothers Karamazov
- Sergei Dovlatov, Russian writer who emigrated to the US, author of the novel Affiliate
- Dmitry Glukhovsky, author of the post-apocalyptic novel Metro 2033
- Nikolai Gogol, considered the "father" of Russian realism, author of The Overcoat, The Nose, Dead Souls
- Ivan Goncharov, author of Oblomov
- Maxim Gorky, founder of socialist realism, author of Twenty-six Men and a Girl
- Vasily Grossman, author of Life and Fate, described by Le Monde as "the greatest Russian novel of the twentieth century"
- Ilf and Petrov popular satirists, authors of The Twelve Chairs
- Nikolai Karamzin, prominent sentimentalist writer and major historian, author of Poor Liza
- Valentin Katayev, author of the industrial novel Time, Forward!
- Veniamin Kaverin, author of the social and adventure novel The Two Captains
- Daniil Kharms, Soviet surrealist and absurdist writer
- Mikhail Lermontov, author of A Hero of our Time, poet
- Nikolai Leskov, author of Lefty and Lady Macbeth of Mtsensk
- Sergey Lukyanenko, most popular contemporary Russian sci-fi writer, author of the Night Watch
- Vladimir Nabokov, author of Lolita, which was ranked at #4 on the list of the Modern Library 100 Best Novels
- Nikolay Nosov, children's writer, author of the popular Neznaika series
- Vladimir Obruchev, geologist and explorer, author of the science fiction and travel novels Plutonia and Sannikov Land
- Yuri Olesha, author of the innovative novel Envy
- Nikolai Ostrovsky, socialist realist writer, best known for his novel How the Steel Was Tempered
- Boris Pasternak, author of Doctor Zhivago, poet and translator, Nobel Prize winner (was forced to decline the prize)
- Viktor Pelevin, postmodernist writer, author of the short novel Omon Ra
- Andrei Platonov, author of The Foundation Pit
- Aleksandr Pushkin, the greatest Russian poet, novelist, author of The Captain's Daughter
- Alexander Radishchev, radical writer, author of Journey from St. Petersburg to Moscow
- Ayn Rand, creator of Objectivism, author of The Fountainhead, and Atlas Shrugged
- Varlam Shalamov, Gulag survivor, author of Kolyma Tales
- Mikhail Sholokhov, Nobel Prize for Literature, author of And Quiet Flows the Don
- Aleksandr Solzhenitsyn, Nobel Prize for Literature, author of One Day in the Life of Ivan Denisovich
- Vladimir Sorokin, one of the most popular writers in modern Russian literature
- Boris and Arkady Strugatsky, collaborative duo of Soviet science fiction writers
- Tatyana Tolstaya, writer, TV host, publicist, novelist, and essayist from the Tolstoy family
- Aleksey Nikolayevich Tolstoy, Soviet writer, best known for his works of science fiction, author of Aelita
- Leo Tolstoy, widely considered to be one of the world's greatest novelists, author of War and Peace, Anna Karenina, and The Death of Ivan Ilyich
- Ivan Turgenev, author of A Sportsman's Sketches, which had an influence on the abolition of serfdom in Russia
- Yury Tynyanov, important member of the Russian Formalist school, author of Lieutenant Kijé
- Eduard Uspensky, children's writer known for his fictional characters Gena the Crocodile and Cheburashka
- Vladimir Voinovich, author of the well-known novel The Life and Extraordinary Adventures of Private Ivan Chonkin
- Ivan Yefremov, paleontologist and science fiction writer, founder of taphonomy, author of The Land of Foam, Andromeda: A Space-Age Tale and Thais of Athens
- Yevgeny Zamyatin, author of the dystopian novel We, which influenced George Orwell's Nineteen Eighty-Four, and Ayn Rand's Anthem

==== Philosophers and critics ====
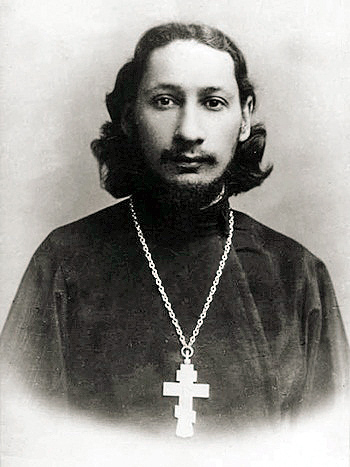
Pavel Florensky

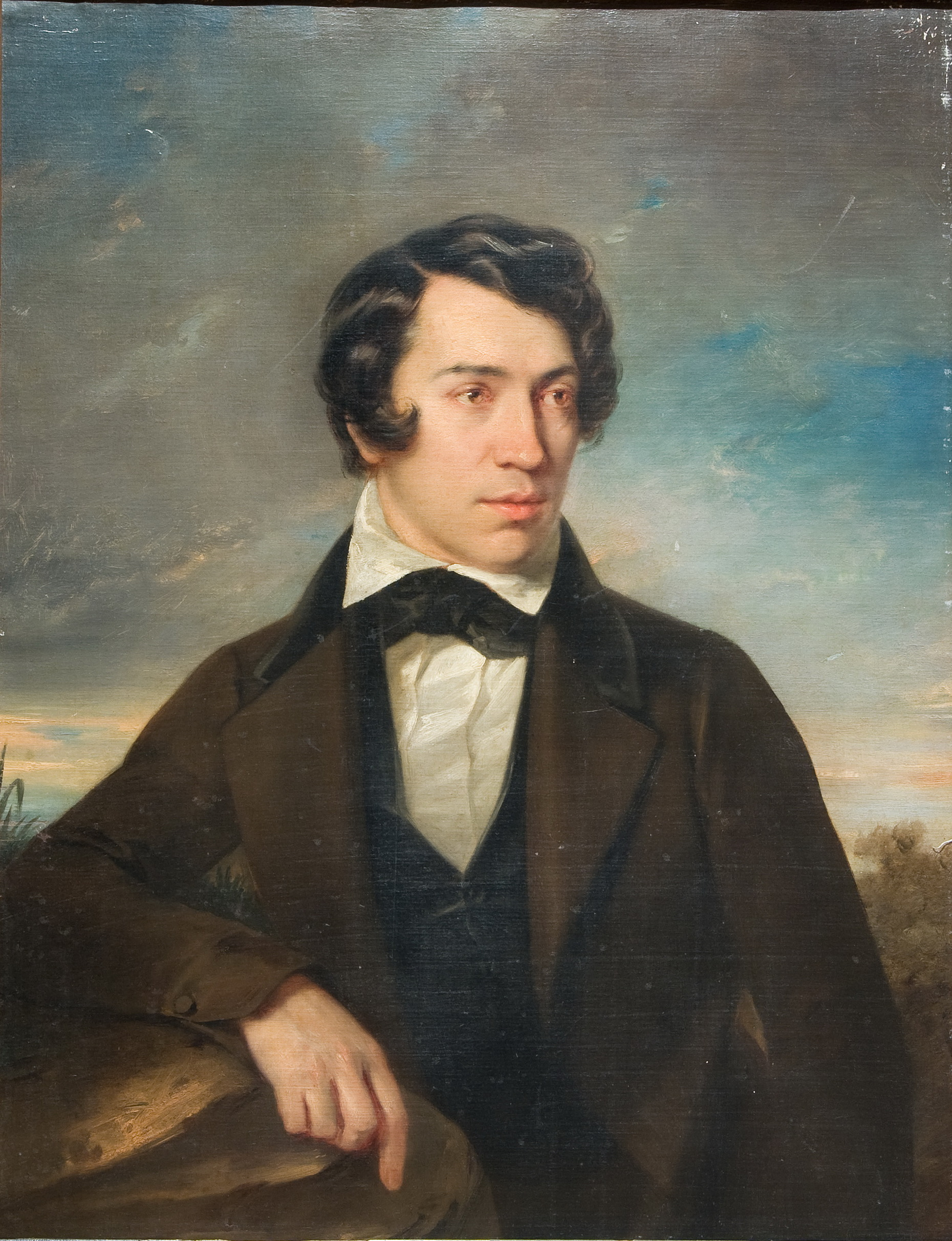
Aleksey Khomyakov

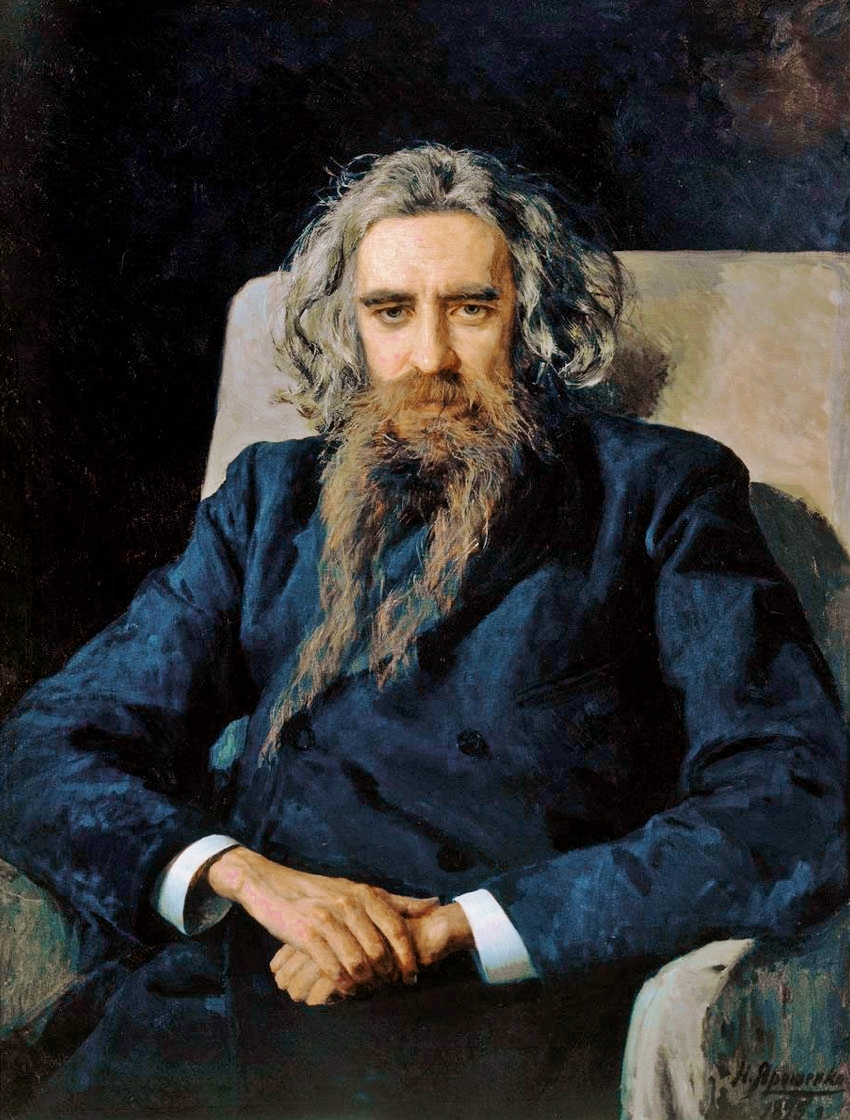
Vladimir Solovyov

- Mikhail Bakhtin, philosopher, literary critic, semiotician, and scholar who worked on literary theory, ethics, and the philosophy of language
- Mikhail Bakunin, well-known revolutionary and theorist of collectivist anarchism
- Vissarion Belinsky, influential critic, and editor of two major literary magazines: Otechestvennye Zapiski, and Sovremennik
- Nikolai Berdyaev, religious and political philosopher
- Helena Blavatsky, founder of Theosophy and the Theosophical Society
- Alexander Bogdanov, physician, philosopher, science fiction writer, and a key figure in the early history of the Bolsheviks
- Nikolay Chernyshevsky, famous for his philosophical novel What is To Be Done?, he was the leader of the revolutionary democratic movement of the 1860s, and an influence on Vladimir Lenin
- Nikolay Danilevsky, naturalist, economist, ethnologist, philosopher, historian, and ideologue of the pan-Slavism and Slavophile movements
- Sergei Diaghilev, art critic and impresario
- Nikolay Dobrolyubov, literary critic, journalist, and revolutionary democrat
- Pavel Florensky, Orthodox theologian, philosopher, mathematician, electrical engineer, and inventor
- Leonid Grinin, important modern sociologist and philosopher of history
- Alexander Herzen, highly influential proponent of populism, socialism, and collectivization
- Mikhail Katkov, conservative journalist and literary critic influential during the reign of Alexander III
- Ivan Kireyevsky, literary critic and philosopher, co-founder of the Slavophile movement
- Aleksey Khomyakov, religious poet and philosopher, co-founder of the Slavophile movement, coined the term sobornost
- Peter Kropotkin, naturalist, geographer and one of the world's foremost anarcho-communists
- Pyotr Lavrov, prominent Russian philosopher, publicist, sociologist, and theorist of narodism
- Konstantin Leontiev, conservative, monarchist reactionary philosopher
- Aleksei Losev, one of the most prominent figures in Russian philosophical and religious thought of the 20th century
- Nikolay Novikov, writer and philanthropist, a man of Russian Enlightenment, often considered to be the first Russian journalist
- Peter D. Ouspensky, esoteric philosopher, author of In Search of the Miraculous
- Dmitri Pisarev, radical writer and social critic whose works had an important influence on Lenin
- Ayn Rand, Objectivist philosopher, best known for her novels The Fountainhead and Atlas Shrugged
- Lev Shestov, influential Ukrainian/Russian existentialist philosopher, author of the well-known works Penultimate Words and All Things are Possible
- Vladimir Solovyov, philosopher, poet, pamphleteer, and literary critic, who played a significant role in the development of Russian philosophy and poetry at the end of the 19th century
- Vladimir Stasov, preeminent 19th-century art critic in Russia
- Leo Tolstoy, Christian anarchist and pacifist, whose ideas and social writings were the basis of the Tolstoyan movement
- Leon Trotsky, Bolshevik, and Marxist, one of the leaders of the Russian Revolution of 1917

==== Playwrights ====
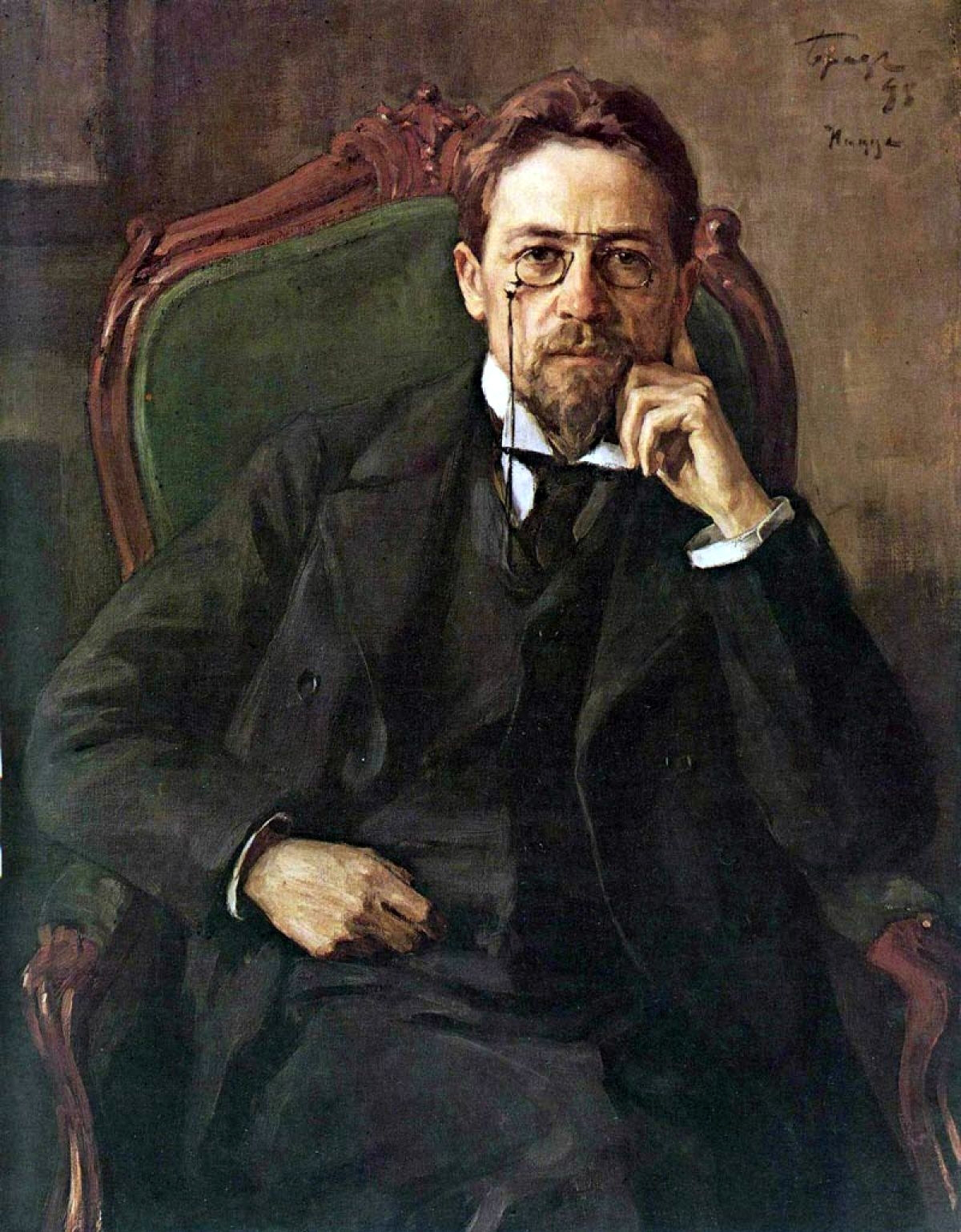
Anton Chekhov

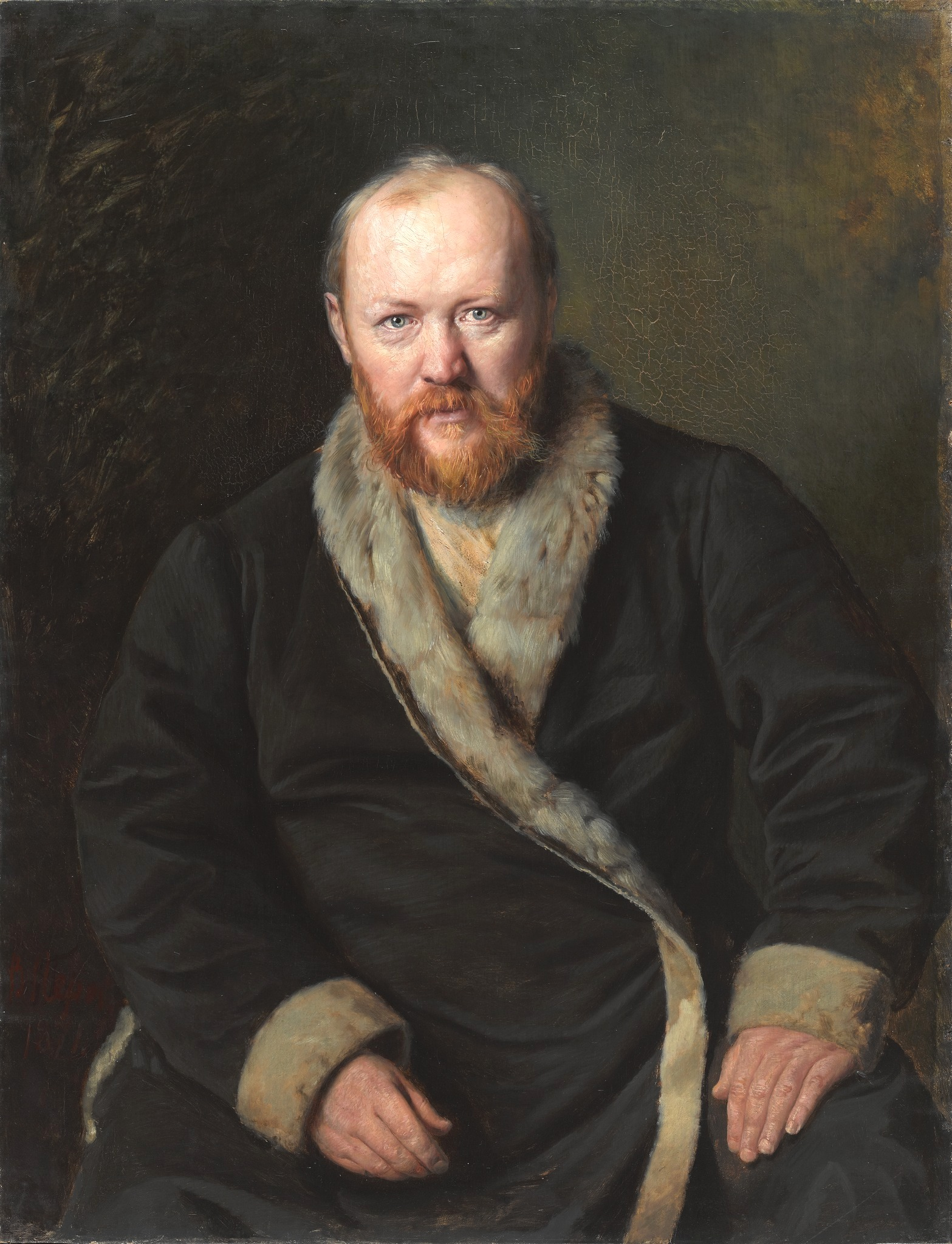
Alexander Ostrovsky

- Leonid Andreyev, author of many popular plays, including He Who Gets Slapped
- Hizgil Avshalumov, soviet novelist, poet and playwright
- Mikhail Bulgakov, popular Soviet writer, author of the play Flight
- Anton Chekhov, famous for his short stories and plays, author of The Cherry Orchard, Uncle Vanya, Three Sisters, The Seagull
- Denis Fonvizin, known chiefly for his famous play The Minor
- Nikolai Gogol, author of the great satirical play The Government Inspector
- Maxim Gorky, author of The Lower Depths, a hallmark of socialist realism
- Aleksandr Griboyedov, author of the popular play Woe from Wit
- Mikhail Lermontov, author of the play Masquerade
- Vladimir Mayakovsky, one of the foremost representatives of Russian Futurism
- Alexander Ostrovsky, known for his plays dealing with the merchant class, most notably The Storm
- Aleksey Pisemsky, realist writer, author of the well-known play A Bitter Fate, considered to be the first Russian realistic tragedy
- Alexander Pushkin, Russia's national poet, also known for his plays, including Boris Godunov and The Stone Guest
- Alexander Sumarokov, poet and playwright who single-handedly created classical theatre in Russia
- Aleksey Konstantinovich Tolstoy, author of historical dramas, including The Death of Ivan the Terrible and Tsar Fyodor Ioannovich
- Leo Tolstoy, one of the greatest Russian writers, author of the plays The Power of Darkness, The Fruits of Enlightenment, and The Living Corpse
- Ivan Turgenev, author of the well known play A Month in the Country

==== Poets ====
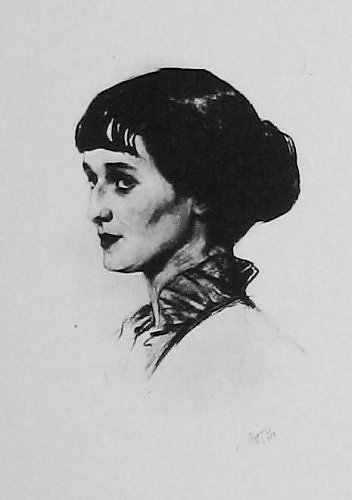
Anna Akhmatova

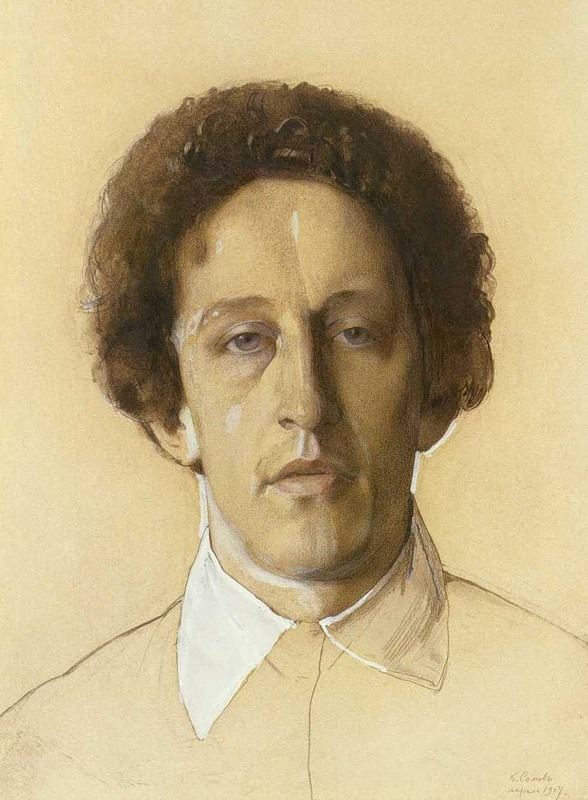
Aleksandr Blok

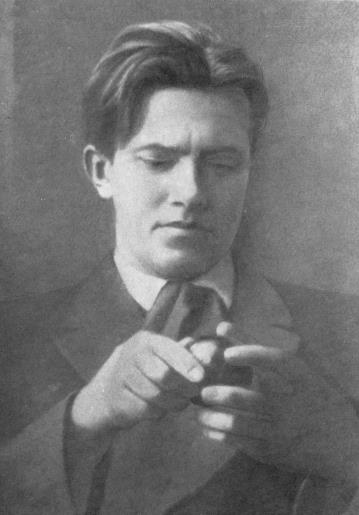
Vladimir Mayakovsky

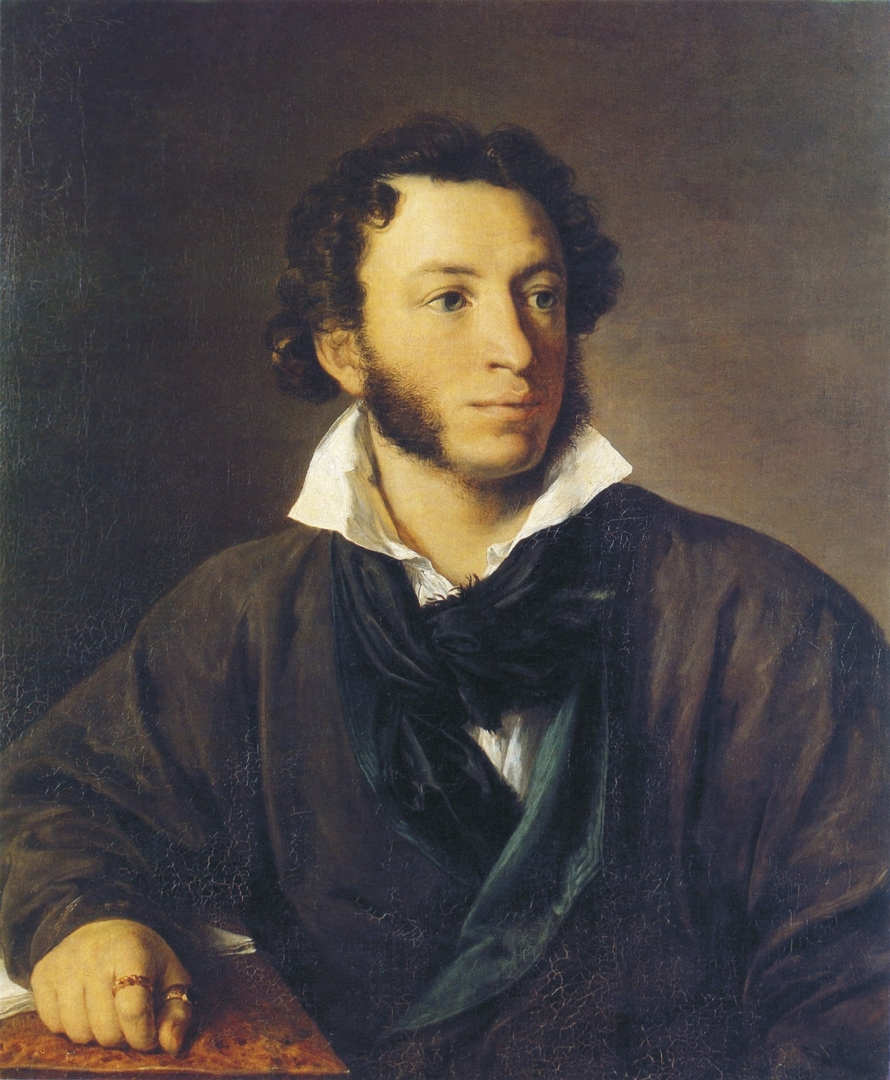
Alexander Pushkin

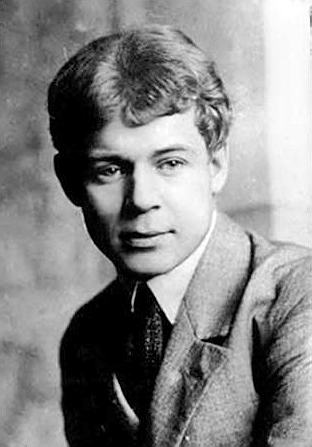
Sergei Yesenin

- Zharaskan Abdirash, Soviet-era Kazakh poet
- Anna Akhmatova, modernist poet, author of Requiem
- Bella Akhmadulina, Soviet and Russian poet who has been cited by Joseph Brodsky as the best living poet in the Russian language
- Innokenty Annensky, poet, critic, and translator, representative of the first wave of Russian Symbolism
- Konstantin Balmont, symbolist poet, one of the major figures of the Silver Age of Russian Poetry
- Evgeny Baratynsky, lauded by Alexander Pushkin as the finest Russian elegiac poet, rediscovered by Anna Akhmatova and Joseph Brodsky as a supreme poet of thought
- Konstantin Batyushkov, an important precursor of Alexander Pushkin
- Andrey Bely, symbolist poet, namesake of the important Andrei Bely Prize
- Alexander Blok, leader of the Russian Symbolist movement, author of "The Twelve"
- Joseph Brodsky, winner of the 1987 Nobel Prize in Literature
- Korney Chukovsky, one of the most popular children's poets in the Russian language
- Denis Davydov, guerilla fighter and soldier-poet of the Napoleonic Wars, invented a genre of hussar poetry noted for its hedonism and bravado
- Gavrila Derzhavin, one of the greatest Russian poets before Alexander Pushkin
- Aleksandr Drakokhrust, Soviet poet
- Gabriel El-Registan, one of the writers of the National Anthem of the Soviet Union
- Afanasy Fet, had a profound influence on the Russian Symbolists, especially Annensky and Blok
- Nikolay Gumilyov, founded the acmeism movement
- Vyacheslav Ivanov, poet and playwright associated with the Russian Symbolism movement
- Antiochus Kantemir, Russian poet-satirist, activist of early Russian Enlightenment
- Velimir Khlebnikov, influential member of the Russian Futurist movement, regarded by his contemporariesas as "a poet's poet"
- Ivan Krylov, Russia's best known fabulist
- Yuri Kublanovsky, poet, essayist, critic and art historian
- Mikhail Lermontov, most important Russian poet after Alexander Pushkin's death, his influence on later Russian literature is still felt in modern times
- Osip Mandelstam, Acmeist poet, author of Tristia
- Vladimir Mayakovsky, among the most important representatives of early 20th-century Russian Futurism
- Apollon Maykov, his lyrical poems often showcase images of Russian villages, nature, and Russian history
- Nikolai Nekrasov, one of Russia's most popular poets, author of the long poem Who is Happy in Russia?
- Boris Pasternak, author of the influential poem "My Sister Life", Nobel Prize winner (was forced to decline the prize)
- Nikolai Ogarev, known to every Russian, not only as a poet, but as the fellow-exile and collaborator of Alexander Herzen on Kolokol, a newspaper printed in England and smuggled into Russia
- Yakov Polonsky, leading Pushkinist poet
- Symeon of Polotsk, academically trained Baroque Belarusian born Russian poet
- Alexander Pushkin, greatest Russian poet, author of Eugene Onegin
- Ilya Selvinsky, leader of the Constructivist movement
- Igor Severyanin, Russian lyrical poet who presided over the circle of the so-called Ego-Futurists
- Boris Slutsky, one of the most important representatives of the War generation of Russian poets
- Fyodor Sologub, influential symbolist poet and writer
- Aleksey Konstantinovich Tolstoy, popular poet and dramatist, known for his humorous and satirical verse
- Vasily Trediakovsky, helped lay the foundations of classical Russian literature
- Marina Tsvetaeva, known primarily for her lyric poetry, widely admired by her fellow poets
- Aleksandr Tvardovsky, chief editor of Novy Mir for many years, author of Vasili Tyorkin
- Fyodor Tyutchev, romantic poet, author of The Last Love
- Maximilian Voloshin, Symbolist poet, famous freemason
- Pyotr Yershov, author of the famous fairy-tale poem The Humpbacked Horse
- Sergei Yesenin, one of the most popular and well-known Russian poets of the 20th century
- Yevgeny Yevtushenko, Soviet/Russian poet, director of several films
- Nikolay Zabolotsky, one of the founders of the Russian avant-garde absurdist group OBERIU
- Vasily Zhukovsky, credited with introducing the Romantic Movement to Russian literature

=== Performing arts ===
==== Actors ====
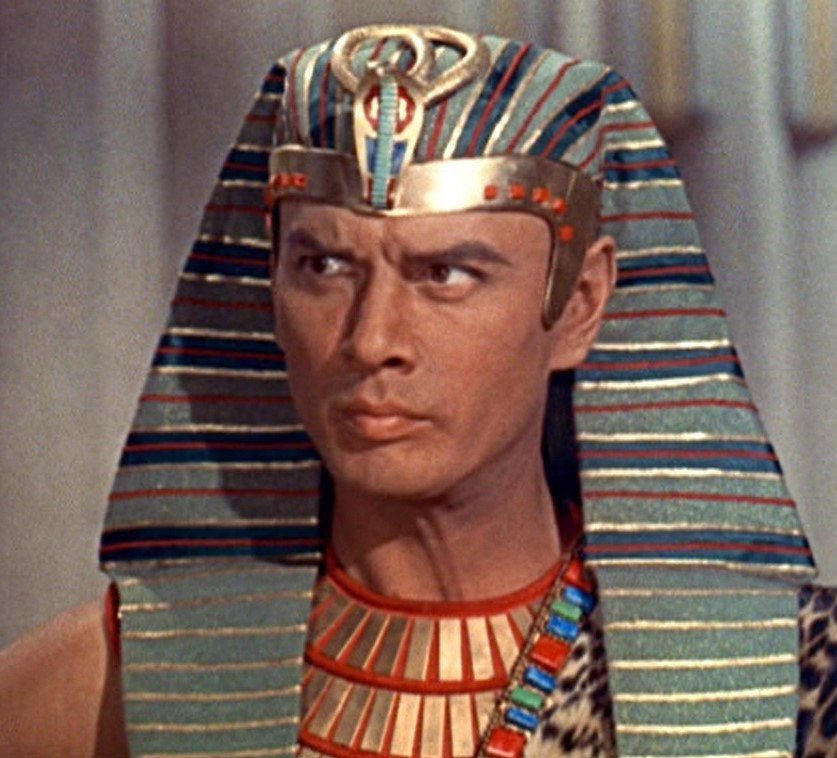
Yul Brynner

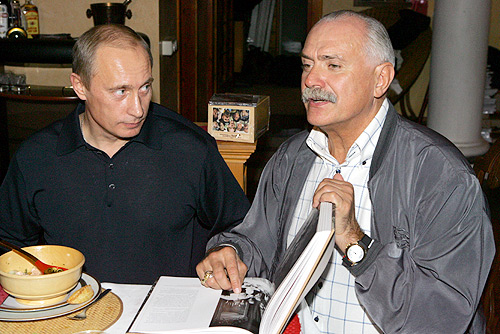
Nikita Mikhalkov

- Vera Alentova, known for her leading role in the famous 1980 Soviet drama Moscow Does Not Believe in Tears
- Sergei Bodrov, Jr., played lead roles in several popular movies, son of playwright, actor, director and producer Sergei Bodrov
- Sergei Bondarchuk, acted in and directed the Academy Award-winning 1966–67 film production of War and Peace
- Yul Brynner, won the Academy Award for best actor in the 1956 film The King and I
- Armen Dzhigarkhanyan, played in more than 170 films, founded his own theater in Moscow
- Leonid Filatov, received many awards, including the Russian Federation State Prize and People's Artist of Russia in 1996
- Milla Jovovich, actress, model, and musician, best known for her role in the widely popular Resident Evil movies
- Lila Kedrova, winner of the Academy Award for Best Supporting Actress in 1964 for the role of Mme Hortense in Zorba the Greek
- Nikita Mikhalkov, co-wrote, directed and acted in the Academy Award-winning film Burnt by the Sun
- Helen Mirren, British actress born to Russian father and English mother
- Lubov Orlova, theatre actress and gifted singer, the first recognized star of Soviet cinema
- Marina Orlova, host of the most popular YouTube guru channel, HotForWords
- Arkady Raikin, stand-up comedian who led the school of Soviet and Russian humorists for about half a century
- Tatiana Samoylova (1934–2014), actress
- Alexander Slastin, actor, best known for his role as Soviet general Vasily Chuikov in the 2004 film Downfall
- Georgy Vitsin, comic actor, best known for his comic roles such as Trus (Coward), a member of an antihero comic trio in a series of films by Leonid Gaidai
- Fyodor Volkov, 18th-century actor and founder of the first permanent Russian theater
- Tanya Weinstein, stage director, actress, and tutor
- Natalie Wood, three-time Academy Award nominee, winner of the Golden Globe Award for her role in the TV series From Here to Eternity
- Vladimir Zharikov, actor, stuntman, cinematographer

==== Theatre directors ====
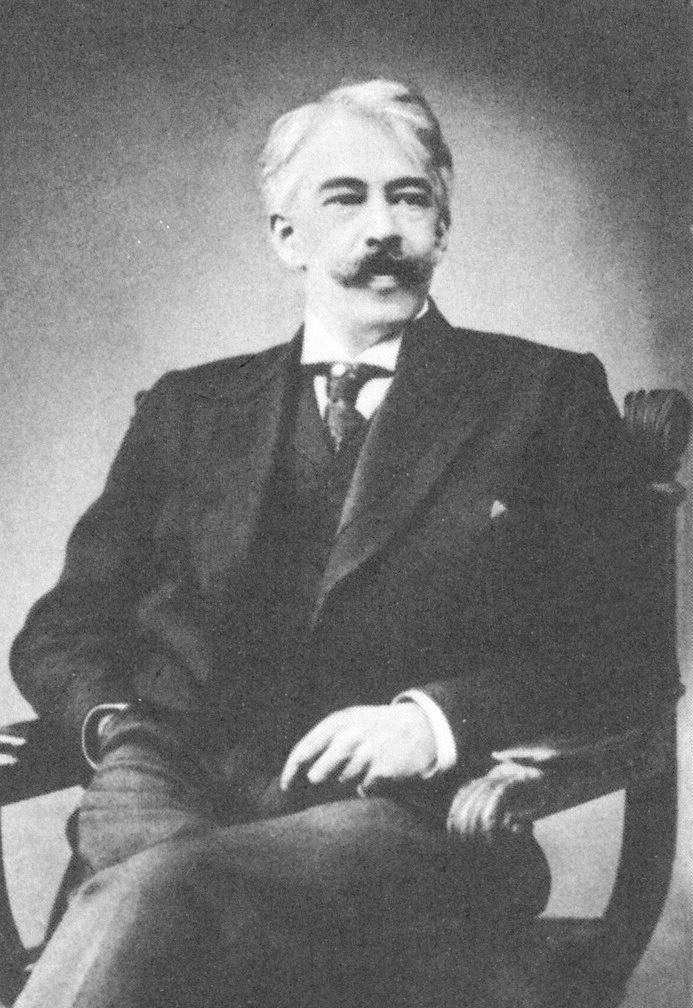
Konstantin Stanislavski

- Michael Chekhov, Russian-American actor, director, author, and theatre practitioner, nephew of Anton Chekhov
- Anatoly Efros, famous Russian and Soviet theatre director, collaborated with the stage director Yury Lyubimov
- Yury Lyubimov, Soviet and Russian stage actor and director associated with the Taganka Theatre which he founded
- Vladimir Nemirovich-Danchenko, theatre director, writer, pedagogue, playwright, producer, and co-founder of the Moscow Art Theatre
- Konstantin Stanislavski, famous actor, theatre director, creator of a widely used system of acting, and co-founder of the Moscow Art Theatre
- Yevgeny Vakhtangov, friend and mentor of Michael Chekhov, founded the Vakhtangov Theatre
- Fyodor Volkov, actor and founder of the first permanent Russian theater

==== Film directors and animators ====
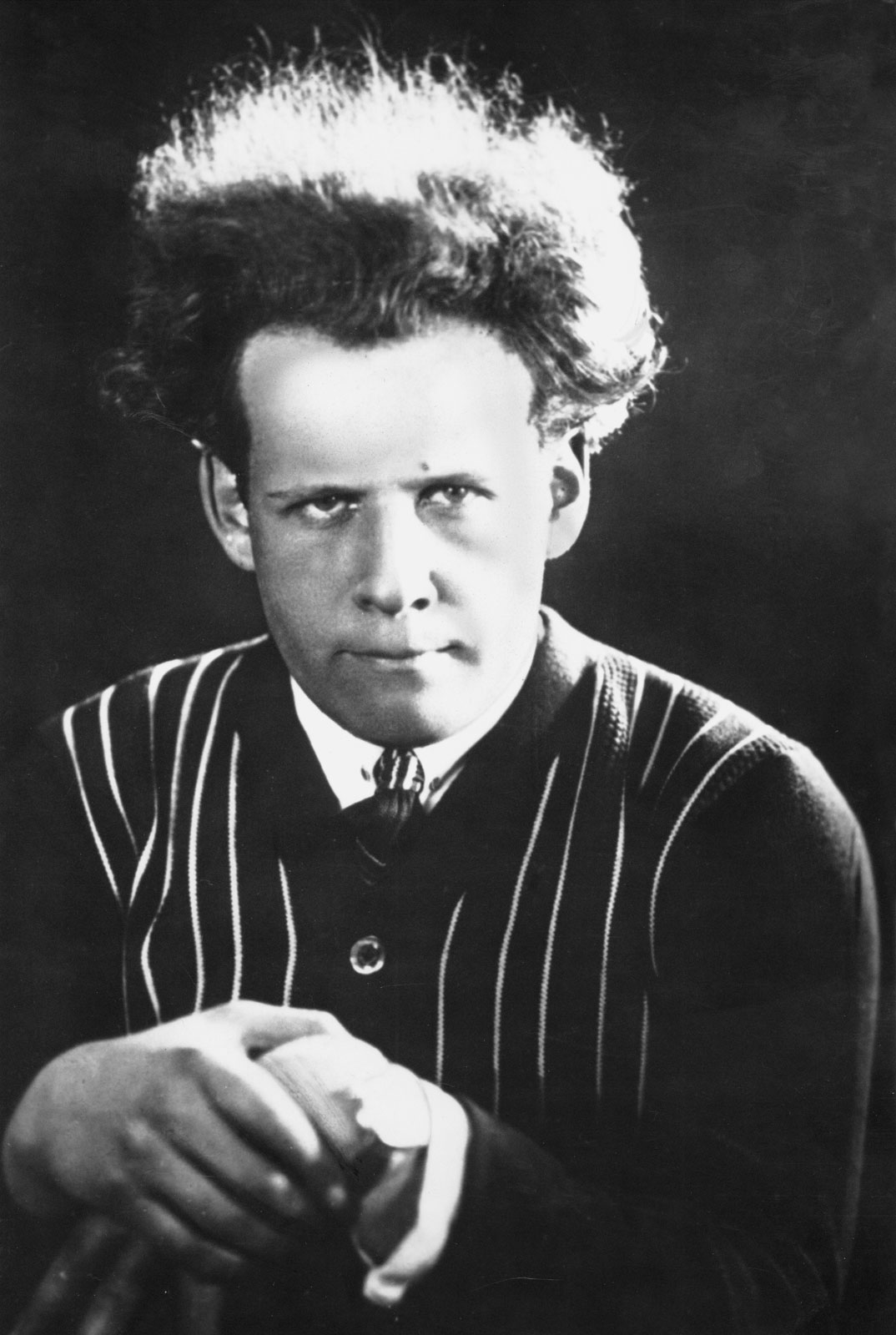
Sergei Eisenstein

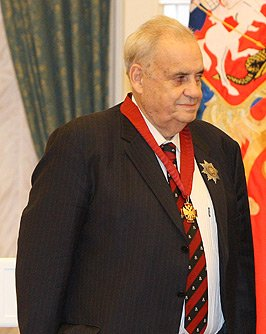
Eldar Ryazanov

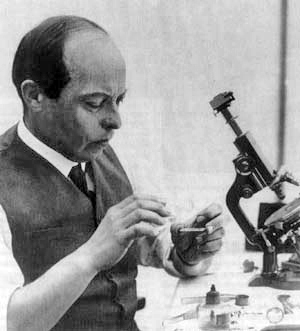
Ladislas Starevich

- Lev Atamanov, animation director of Soyuzmultfilm, best known for The Snow Queen
- Fyodor Bondarchuk, director of the acclaimed film The 9th Company, son of Sergei Bondarchuk
- Grigori Chukhrai, Academy Award nominee for Best Original Screenplay for the film Ballad of a Soldier
- Pavel Chukhrai, Academy Award nominee for Best Foreign Language Film for The Thief
- Alexander Dovzhenko, often cited as one of the most important early Soviet filmmakers
- Sergei Eisenstein, his work profoundly influenced early filmmakers owing to his innovative use of and writings about montage
- Vasily Goncharov, directed the first Russian feature film Defence of Sevastopol
- Leonid Gaidai, his movies broke theatre attendance records and are still some of the top-selling DVDs in Russia
- Roman Kachanov, one of the founders and leaders of Russian stop-motion animation
- Andrei Konchalovsky, director of popular movies including Runaway Train and Tango & Cash
- Fjodor Khitruk, one of the most influential Russian animators and animation directors
- Elem Klimov, best known for his film Come and See
- Grigori Kozintsev, known for his silent films and adaptations of Shakespeare
- Lev Kuleshov, taught at and helped establish the world's first film school (the Moscow Film School)
- Aleksandr Petrov, won the Academy Award for Animated Short Film for The Old Man and the Sea
- Yakov Protazanov, one of the founding fathers of Russian cinema
- Aleksandr Ptushko, referred to as "the Soviet Walt Disney", due to his prominent early role in animation in the Soviet Union
- Mikhail Romm, director and teacher, known for his film Nine Days in One Year
- Eldar Ryazanov, Soviet/Russian director famous for his comedies
- Karen Shakhnazarov, chairman of Mosfilm, one of the largest and oldest film studios in Russia
- Vasily Shukshin, actor, writer, screenwriter and movie director who specialized in rural themes
- Alexander Sokurov, critically acclaimed director, a regular at the Cannes Film Festival
- Ladislas Starevich, Russian and French stop-motion animator who used insects and animals as his protagonists
- Genndy Tartakovsky, Russian-American animator best known for Dexter's Laboratory, Samurai Jack, and Star Wars: Clone Wars
- Andrei Tarkovsky, internationally renowned director and film theorist
- Dziga Vertov, pioneering documentary film director and writer

==== Ballet dancers and choreographers ====
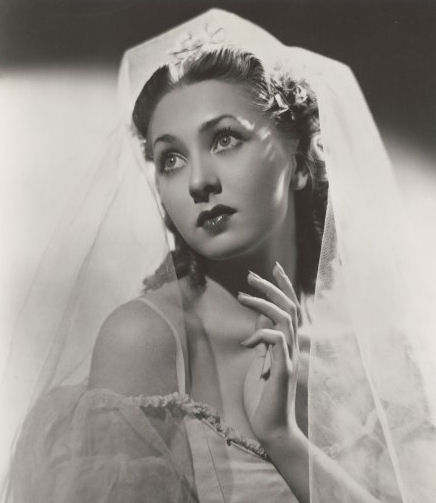
Irina Baronova

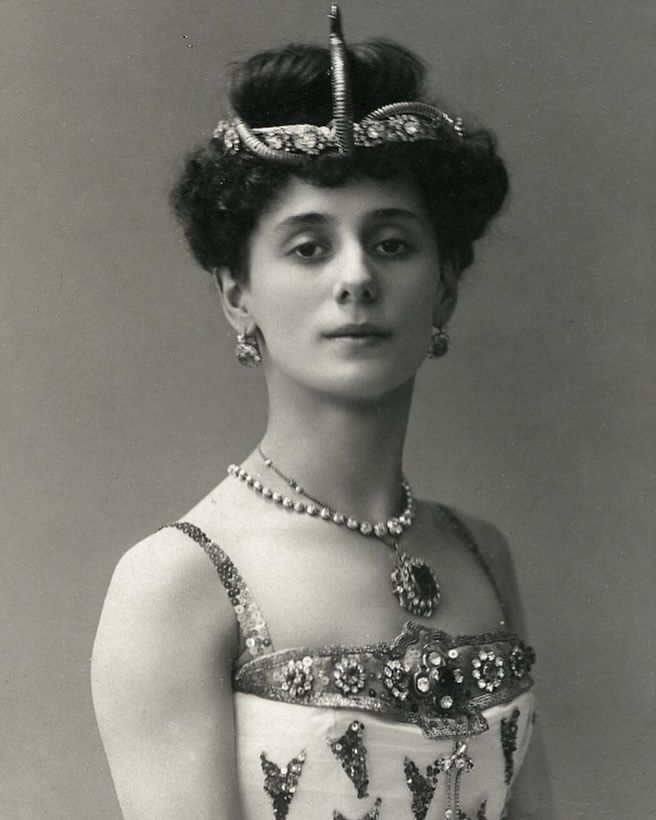
Anna Pavlova

- Irina Baronova, ballerina, choreographer
- Mikhail Baryshnikov, ballet dancer
- Sergei Diaghilev, ballet impresario
- Irina Dvorovenko, ballet dancer
- Michel Fokine, choreographer, dancer
- Elizaveta Gerdt, ballerina
- Pavel Gerdt, dancer
- Alexander Godunov, ballet dancer
- Tamara Karsavina, ballerina
- Mathilde Kschessinska, prima ballerina
- Natalia Makarova, ballerina
- Vaslav Nijinsky, ballet dancer, choreographer
- Ivan Novikoff, ballet master
- Rudolf Nureyev, ballet dancer
- Valery Panov, ballet dancer, choreographer
- Anna Pavlova, ballerina
- Maya Plisetskaya, ballerina
- Olga Preobrajenska, ballerina
- Tatiana Riabouchinska, ballerina
- Yuri Soloviev, ballet dancer
- Galina Ulanova, ballerina
- Agrippina Vaganova, ballet teacher
- Svetlana Zakharova, ballerina
- Maria Khoreva, ballet dancer

==== Classical composers and musicians ====
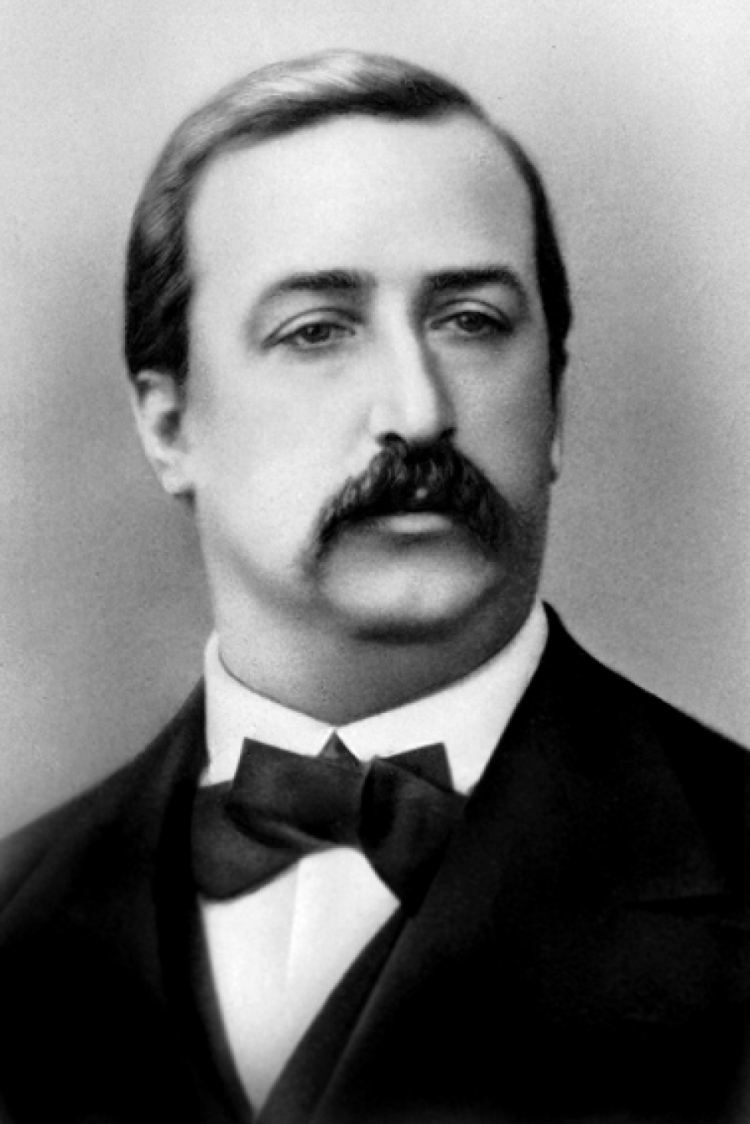
Alexander Borodin

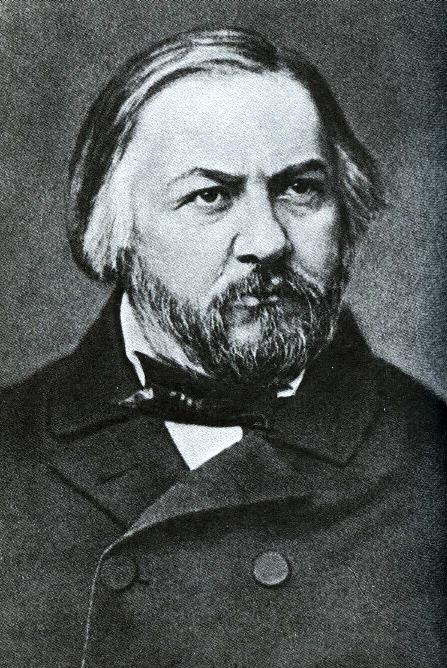
Mikhail Glinka

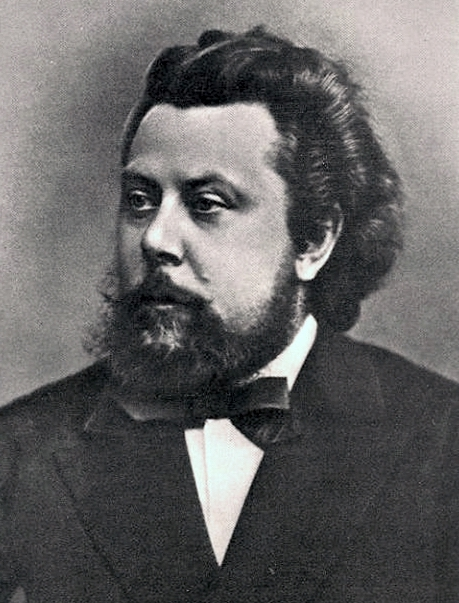
Mussorgsky

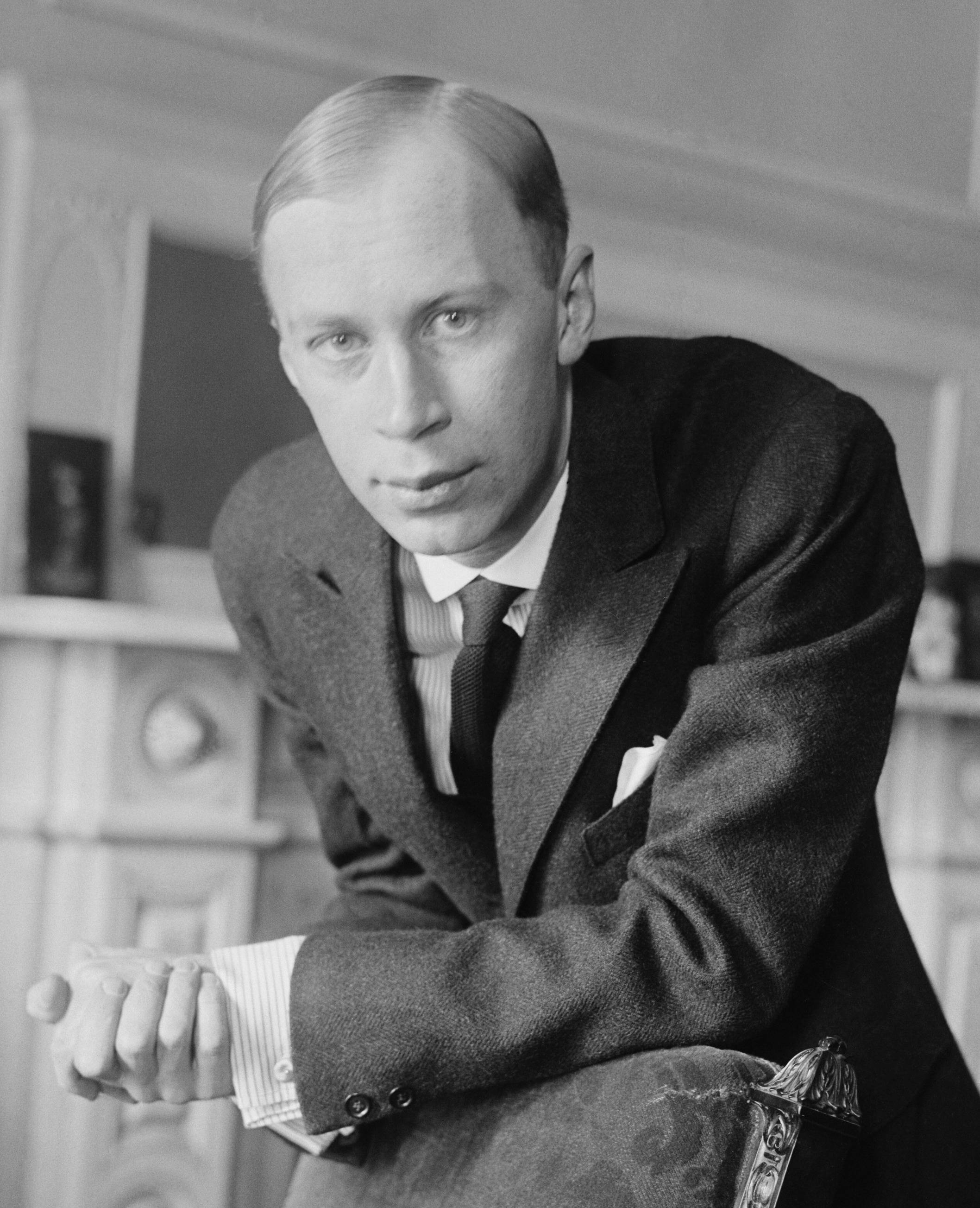
Prokofiev

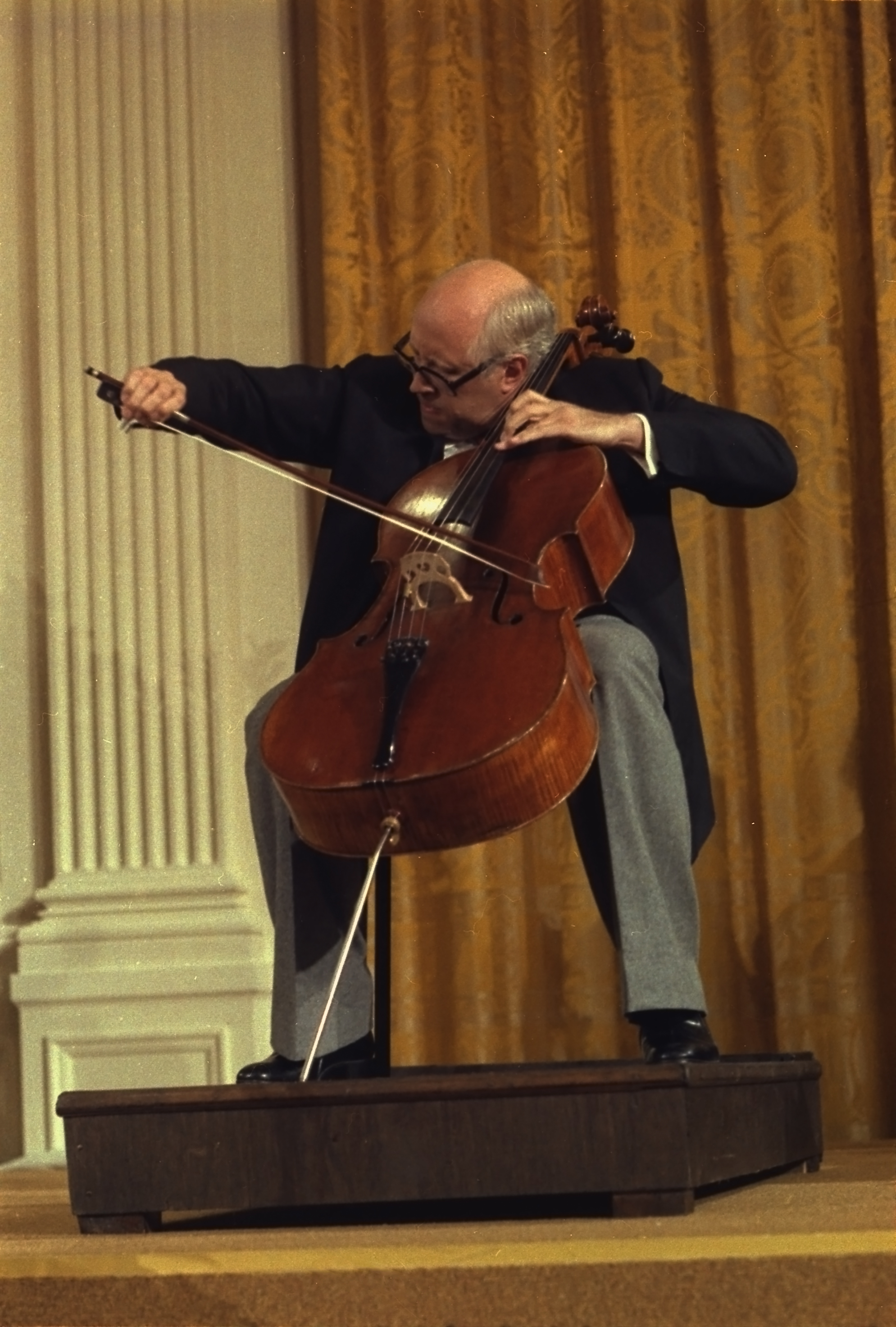
Mstislav Rostropovich

- Alexander Vasilyevich Alexandrov, composer
- Anton Arensky, composer
- Mily Balakirev, composer
- Alexander Borodin, composer
- Sergei Bortkiewicz, composer
- Valeri Brainin, composer, musical scientist
- César Cui, composer
- Maria Eklund, conductor
- Vladimir Gapontsev, classical guitarist
- Michael L. Geller, composer, viola player
- Valery Gergiev, pianist, conductor
- Emil Gilels, pianist
- Alexander Glazunov, composer
- Mikhail Glinka, composer of Russlan and Ludmilla
- Nikolai Golovanov, conductor
- Alexander Gretchaninoff, composer
- Vladimir Horowitz, pianist
- Dmitry Kabalevsky, composer
- Aram Khachaturian, composer
- Tikhon Khrennikov, composer
- Leonid Kogan, violinist
- Anatoly Konstantinovich Lyadov, composer
- Sergei Lyapunov, composer
- Nikolai Medtner, composer, pianist
- Modest Mussorgsky, composer of Boris Godunov, Pictures at an Exhibition
- Nikolai Myaskovsky, composer
- Natasha Paremski, pianist
- Gregor Piatigorsky, composer
- Mikhail Pletnev, pianist
- Sergei Prokofiev, composer, pianist and conductor
- Sergei Rachmaninoff, pianist, composer, conductor
- Vadim Repin, violinist
- Sviatoslav Richter, pianist
- Nikolai Rimsky-Korsakov, composer
- Mstislav Rostropovich, cellist and conductor
- Gennady Rozhdestvensky, conductor
- Nikolai Rubinstein, pianist, conductor and composer
- Alexei Rumiantsev, pianist, composer
- Vasily Ilyich Safonov, composer and music educator
- Alfred Schnittke, composer
- Alexander Scriabin, composer and pianist
- Alexander Serov, composer
- Rodion Shchedrin, composer
- Vissarion Shebalin, composer
- Dmitri Shostakovich, composer and pianist
- Regina Spektor, musician
- Igor Stravinsky, composer
- Georgy Sviridov, composer
- Aleksandr Taneyev, composer
- Sergey Taneyev, composer
- Mikael Tariverdiev, composer
- Boris Tchaikovsky, composer
- Pyotr Tchaikovsky, composer
- Alexander Tcherepnin, composer
- Galina Ustvolskaya, composer
- Aleksander Vakoulsky, conductor
- Maxim Vengerov, violinist

==== Opera and choir singers ====
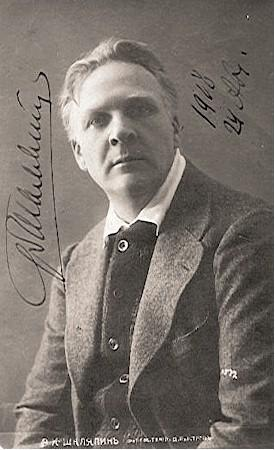
Feodor Chaliapin

- Nikolay Baskov, opera singer
- Evgeny Belyaev, singer
- Feodor Chaliapin, opera singer
- Dmitri Hvorostovsky, opera singer
- Anna Netrebko, opera singer
- Vladimir Rosing, singer, director
- Elizabeth Sandunova, opera singer

=== Modern musicians, singers and bands ===
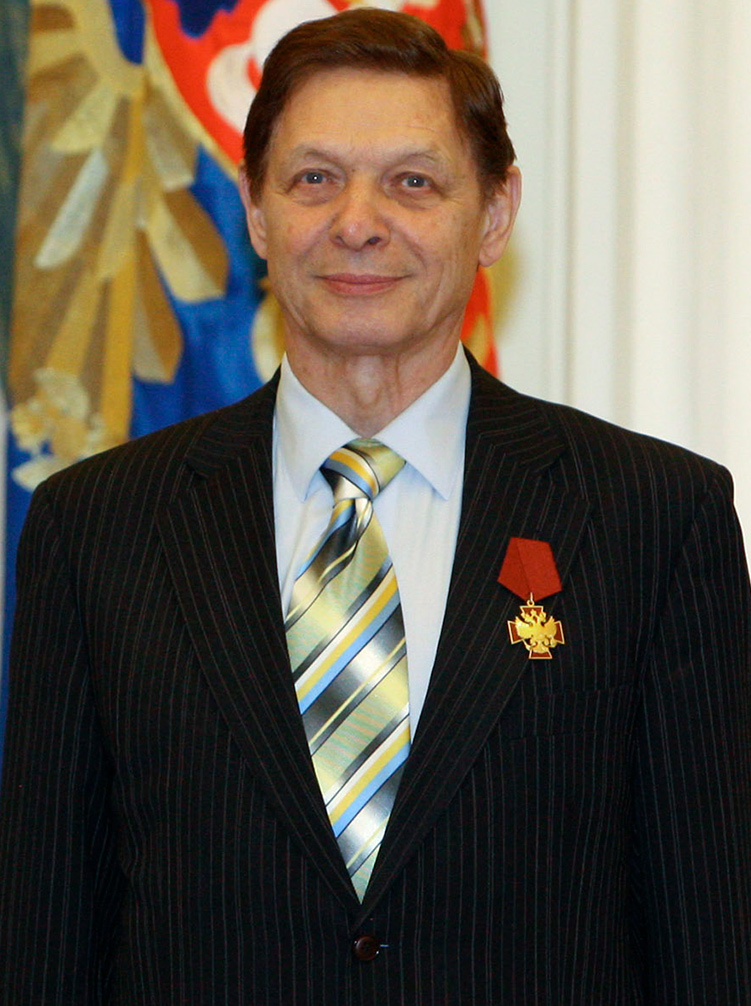
Eduard Khil

- Yuri Antonov, composer, singer
- Sasha Argov (1914–95), composer
- Dima Bilan, composer, Eurovision winner
- Polina Gagarina, Singer, Eurovision runner-up
- Lena Katina, singer of musical duo t.A.T.u.
- Eduard Khil (1934–2012), singer
- Philipp Kirkorov, pop singer
- Sergey Lazarev, vocalist
- Origa, singer, performs theme songs for various anime series
- Natalia O'Shea, linguist, songwriter, musician (Irish harp, guitar), vocalist and leader of the bands Melnitsa (folk-rock) and Clann Lir (traditional Celtic folk)
- Aleksandra Pakhmutova, composer
- Alla Pugacheva, singer and composer
- Second Hand Band, musical group from Moscow
- Andrey Shibko (born 1975), pianist
- Regina Spektor, musician
- Valery Leontiev, singer
- Viktor Tsoi, poet, composer, musician, actor in the 1980s
- Julia Volkova, singer of musical duo t.A.T.u.
- Vladimir Vysotsky (1938–80), poet, composer, musician, actor in the 1970s
- KREC, rap band from St. Petersburg
- Alyona Shvets, pop singer

==== Radio and TV people ====
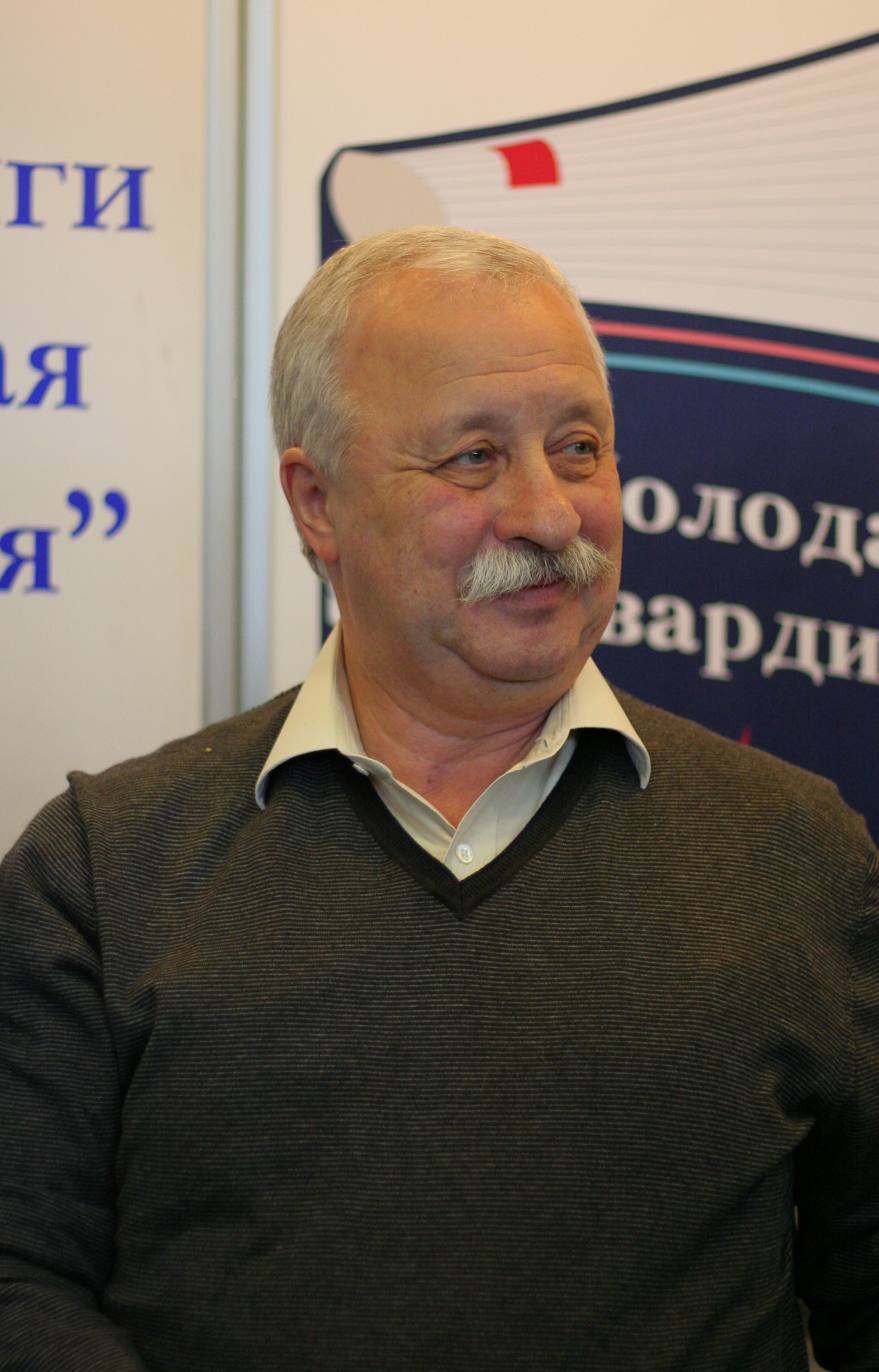
Leonid Yakubovich

Igor Kirillov

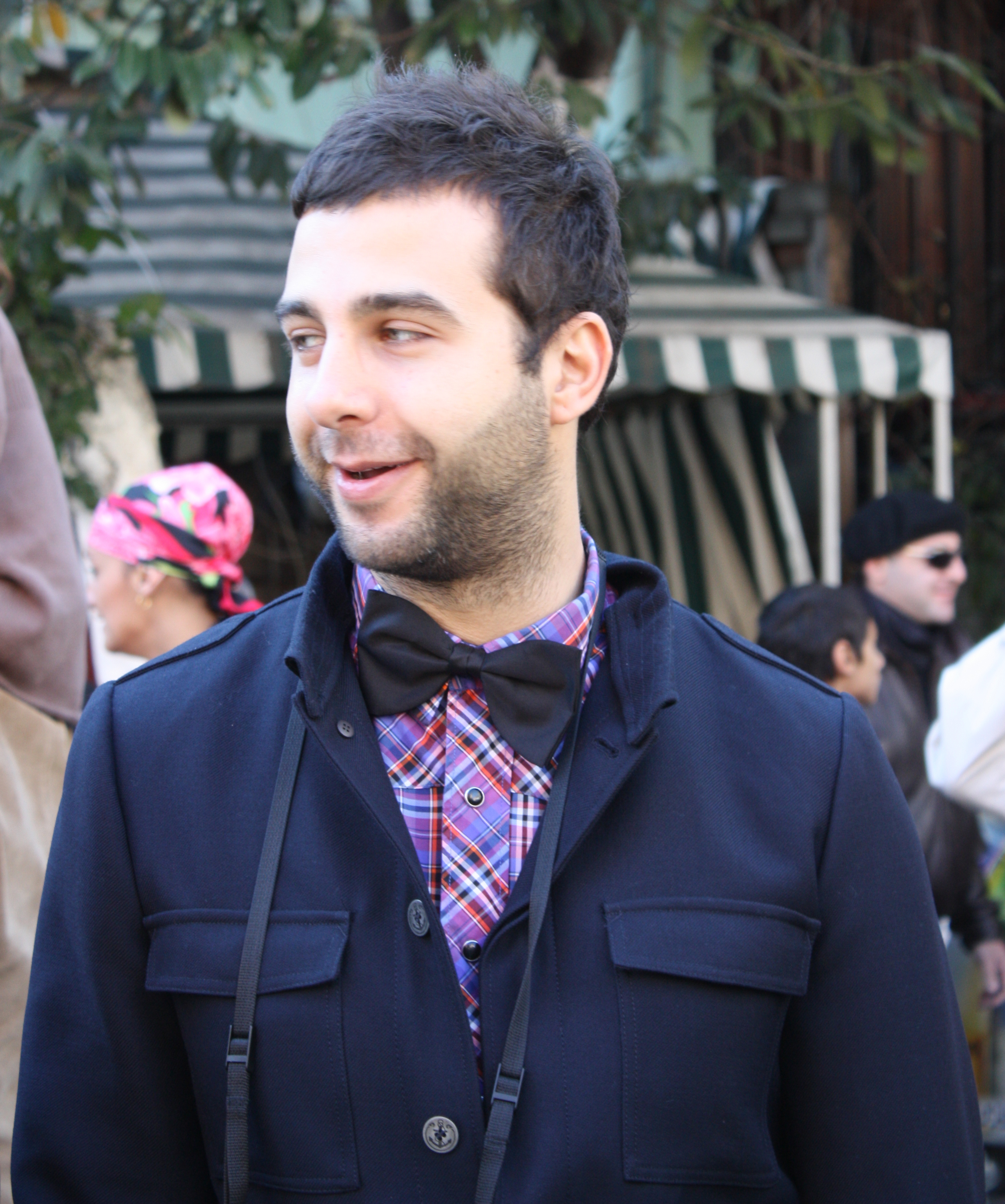
Ivan Urgant

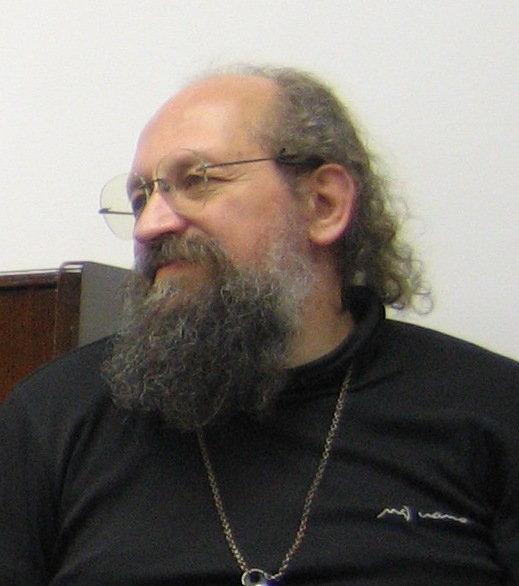
Anatoly Wasserman

- Joe Adamov, journalist and presenter on Radio Moscow and its successor the Voice of Russia for over 60 years
- Dinara Sadretdinova, TV presenter
- Nikolai Fomenko, musician, comic actor, showman and motor racer, president of Marussia Motors company which produces the first Russian supercar, Marussia
- Maxim Galkin, parodist, singer and host for the Russian adaptations of Who Wants to Be a Millionaire? from 2001 to 2008, and The Million Pound Drop
- Igor Kirillov, for 30 years a news anchor of the Soviet Central Television's prime time news program Vremya
- Mikhail Leontyev, political pundit on national TV Channel One, host and author of the program Odnako
- Vladislav Listyev, arguably the most renowned Russian journalist and TV anchor in the 1980s and 1990s, the first director of the Channel One, founder of the Pole Chudes and other popular TV shows
- Alexander Maslyakov, for over 45 years the host for the humour game show KVN
- Yevgeny Petrosyan, popular stand-up comedian and host of a number of humour TV shows
- Vladimir Posner, political pundit and host on radio and TV, for many years working in the United States, Soviet Union and Russia
- Yuri Senkevich, participant of Thor Heyerdahl's voyages, anchorman of the Travelers' Club show for the record 30 years
- Margarita Simonyan, journalist, editor-in-chief of RT (Russia Today)
- Kseniya Sobchak, TV celebrity, host for a number of popular programs, Russia's "It girl" and "Russia's Paris Hilton"
- Roman Trakhtenberg, actor, popular host of humour shows on radio and TV, an expert on Russian jokes
- Vladimir Turchinsky, bodybuilder, TV and radio presenter, actor and singer
- Ivan Urgant, showman and actor, host of many popular Russian TV shows and ceremonies, such as Projectorparishilton and 2009 Eurovision Song Contest
- Tatiana Vishnevskaya, presenter and media entrepreneur
- Vladimir Voroshilov, author, producer and anchorman of the intellectual game show What? Where? When? from 1975 to 2000
- Leonid Yakubovich, actor and TV anchorman, the host for the Pole Chudes show for 20 years
- Anatoly Wasserman, erudite, journalist and political pundit, a frequent winner of intellectual TV games such as What? Where? When? and Svoya Igra (Russian version of Jeopardy!)
- Mikhail Zadornov, stand-up comedian and writer, particularly famous for his satirical comparisons of Russians and nationals of other countries, especially Americans

==== Fashion models ====
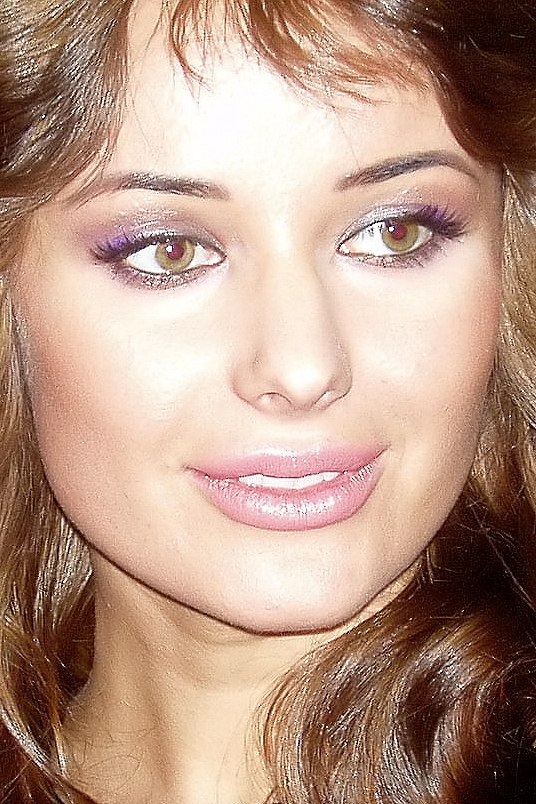
Oxana Fedorova

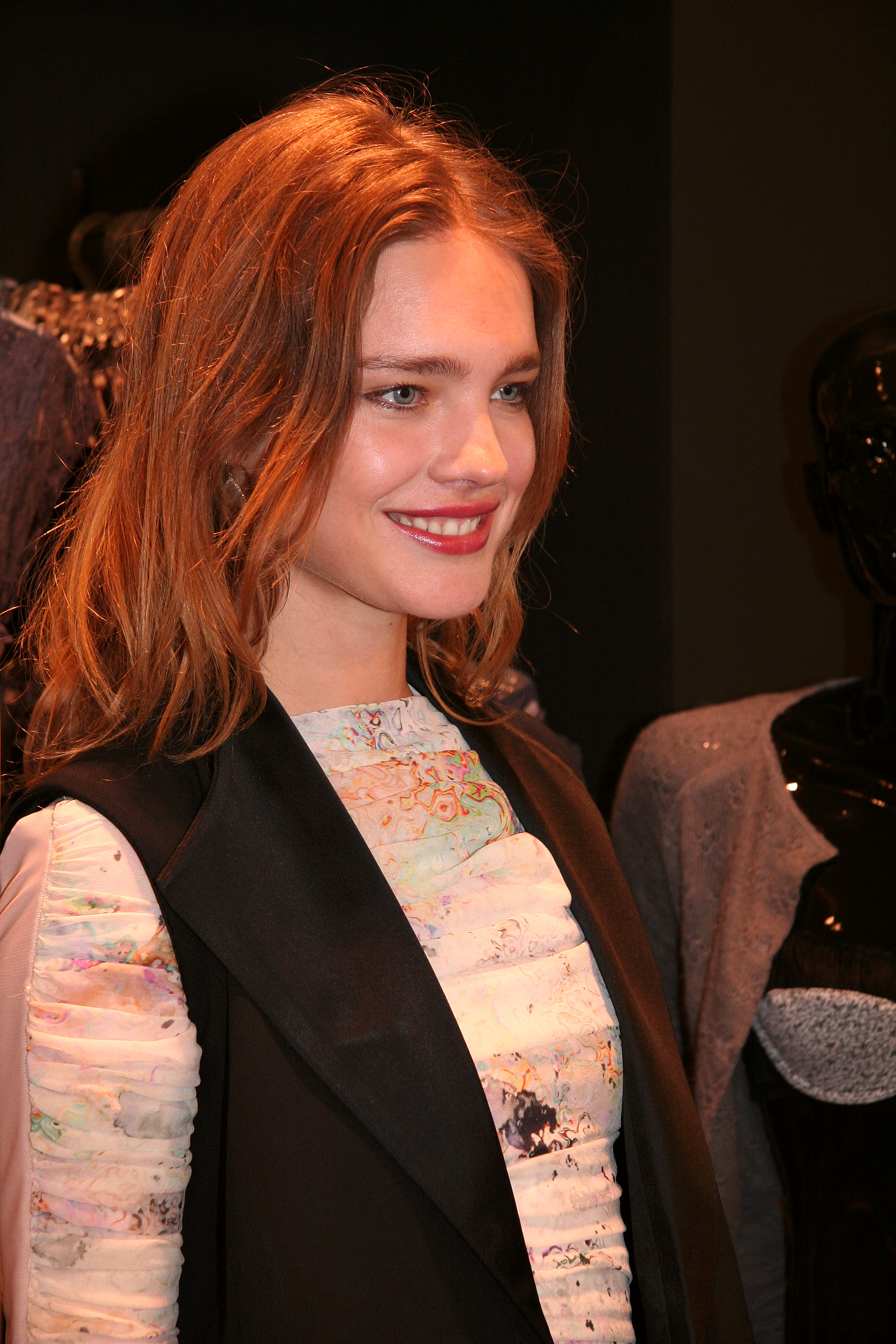
Natalia Vodianova

- Alena Shishkova, Miss Russia 2012 runner up
- Irina Antonenko, Miss Russia 2010
- Oxana Fedorova, Miss Universe
- Ksenia Kahnovich
- Tatiana Kovylina
- Irina Kulikova
- Elena Melnik
- Sasha Pivovarova
- Natasha Polevshchikova
- Vlada Roslyakova
- Anna Selezneva
- Irina Shaykhlislamova
- Katya Shchekina
- Tatiana Sorokko
- Natasha Stefanenko, model and actress
- Daria Strokous
- Natalia Vodianova
- Anne Vyalitsyna
- Inna Zobova

== Sportspeople ==
=== Basketball ===
- David Blatt, U.S. college and Israeli professional guard; coach in Israel & Russia, Russian national basketball team
- Alex Chubrevich (born 1986), Israeli basketball player
- Egor Dëmin, NBA basketball player
- Alexander Gomelsky, head coach of USSR national team for 30 years, including victory in 1988 Summer Olympics, Naismith Basketball Hall of Fame, FIBA Hall of Fame
- Andrei Kirilenko, NBA basketball player
- Daniel Koperberg (born 1997), Israeli basketball player
- Egor Koulechov (born 1994), Israeli-Russian professional basketball player for Israeli team Ironi Nahariya
- Kirill Pishchalnikov, PBL, NCAA, basketball player

=== Boxers ===
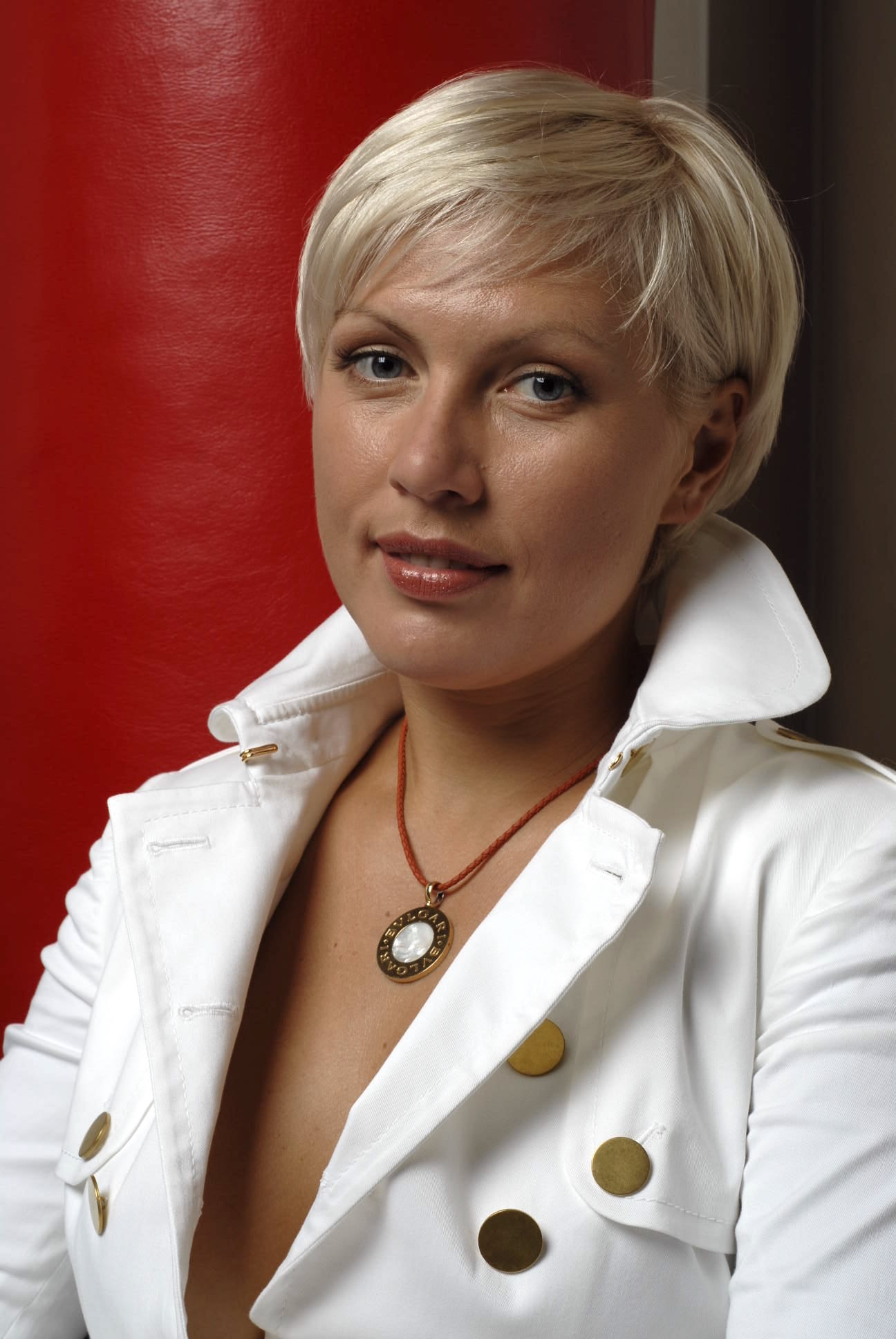
Natascha Ragosina

- Boris Lagutin, double Olympic gold medalist light-middleweight division
- Oleg Maskaev, professional boxer, former WBC Heavyweight Champion
- Dmitry Pirog, professional boxer, WBO Middleweight Champion
- Alexander Povetkin, Olympic gold medalist
- Natascha Ragosina, boxing world champion
- Shamil Sabirov, Olympic gold medalist light flyweight
- Oleg Saitov, double Olympic gold medalist in the welterweight division
- Aleksei Tishchenko, Olympic gold medalist featherweight and lightweight divisions
- Kostya Tszyu, professional boxer, former Undisputed Junior Welterweight champion
- Nikolai Valuev, professional boxer, former 2-time WBA Heavyweight champion

=== Chess players ===
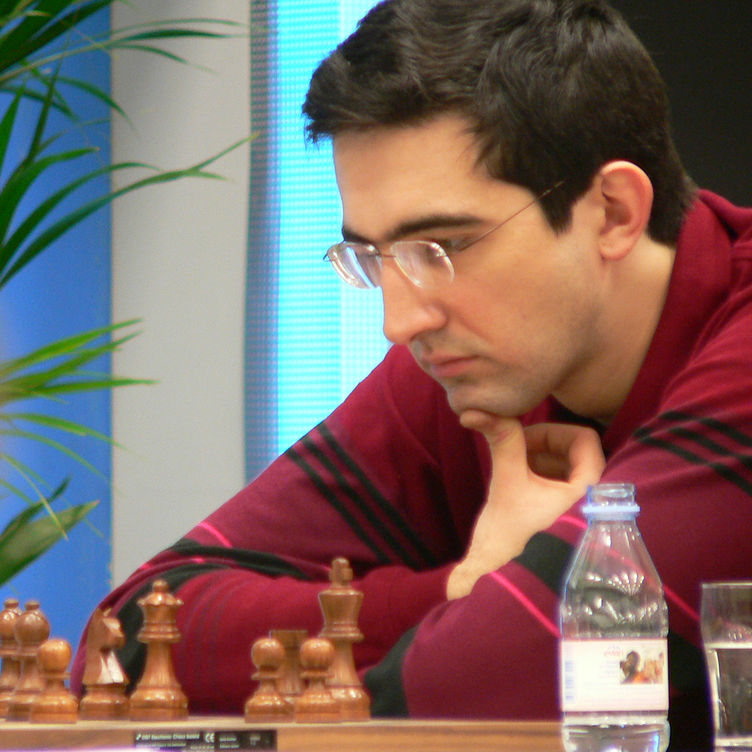
Vladimir Kramnik

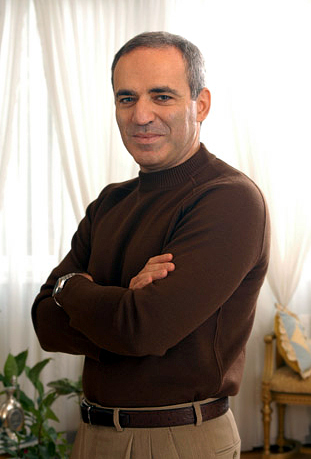
Garry Kasparov

- Alexander Alekhine
- Yuri Averbakh
- Mikhail Chigorin
- Mikhail Botvinnik
- Semen Furman
- Anatoly Karpov
- Garry Kasparov
- Victor Korchnoi
- Vladimir Kramnik
- Grigory Levenfish
- Andor Lilienthal
- Vyacheslav Ragozin
- Vasily Smyslov
- Boris Spassky
- Leonid Yudasin

=== Fencers ===
- Sergey Bida (born 1993), épée fencer, Olympic silver medalist living in the United States
- Violetta Khrapina Bida (born 1994), Olympic épée fencer living in the United States
- Konstantin Lokhanov (born 1998), sabre fencer, 2-time junior world champion and Olympic fencer living in the United States
- Maria Mazina (born 1964), épée fencer, Olympic gold medalist, bronze
- Mark Midler (1931–2012), foil fencer, 2-time Olympic champion
- Mark Rakita (born 1938), saber fencer, 2-time Olympic champion, 2-time silver
- Yakov Rylsky (1928–1999), saber fencer, Olympic champion
- Sergey Sharikov (1974–2015), sabre fencer, two-time Olympic gold medalist, silver, bronze
- David Tyshler (1927–2014), sabre fencer, Olympic bronze medalist
- Eduard Vinokurov (1942–2010), sabre fencer, 2-time Olympic gold medalist, silver, six-time team world champion
- Iosif Vitebskiy (born 1938), épée fencer, Soviet Ukrainian Olympic medalist and world champion, US fencing coach

=== Figure skaters ===
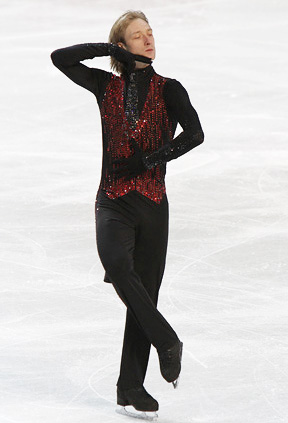
Evgeni Plushenko

- Ludmila Belousova, two-time Olympic pairs champion
- Ekaterina Gordeeva, two-time Olympic pairs champion
- Aleksandr Gorelik, pair skater, Olympic silver, World Championship 2-time silver, bronze
- Sergei Grinkov, two-time Olympic pairs champion
- Gennadi Karponossov, Olympic champion, 2-time World Champion, silver, 2-time bronze, ice dancer & coach
- Evgenia Medvedeva, 2-time Olympic silver, 2 time World Champion, 2-time European champion, European silver, World bronze, first singles skater to set a 13-competition winning Streak, 2-time back to back Grand Slam winner
- Evgeni Plushenko, 2006 Olympic champion
- Oleg Protopopov, two-time Olympic pairs champion
- Julia Shapiro, pair skater
- Irina Slutskaya, two-time World Champion, 3-time silver, bronze, Olympic silver, bronze
- Maxim Staviski, World Champion ice dancer, silver, bronze
- Alexandra Trusova, first woman to land a quad Lutz jump, quad Toe loop and quad flip, Olympic silver.
- Alexei Urmanov, 1994 Olympic champion
- Alexei Yagudin, 2002 Olympic champion
- Alina Zagitova, 2018 Olympic champion and Grand Slam winner

=== Gymnasts ===
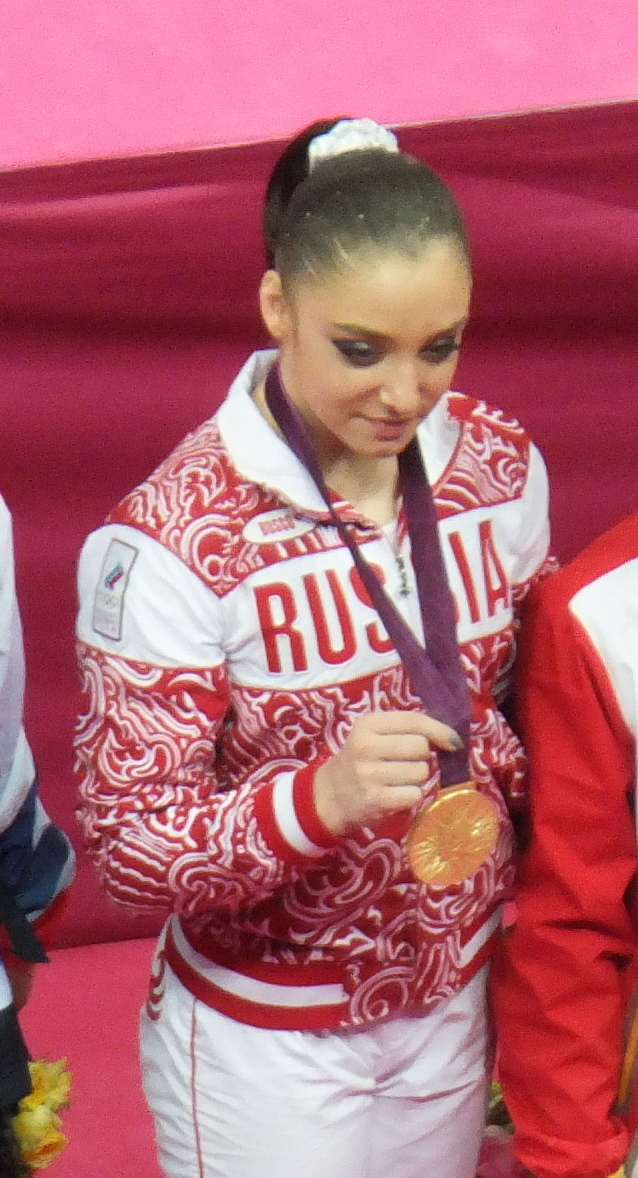
Aliya Mustafina

- Nikolai Andrianov, winner of 15 Olympic medals
- Yelena Davydova, 1980 Olympic all-around champion
- Svetlana Khorkina, winner of 7 Olympic medals
- Olga Korbut, winner of 4 Olympic medals
- Yevgeniya Kanayeva, only rhythmic gymnast to win two Olympic all-around gold medals
- Sofia Muratova, winner of 8 Olympic medals
- Aliya Mustafina, 2012 Olympic gold medalist
- Alexei Nemov, winner of 12 Olympic medals
- Natalia Shaposhnikova, 2-time Olympic champion
- Yelena Shushunova, Olympic champion
- Aleksandr Tkachyov, 2-time Olympic champion

=== Ice hockey players ===
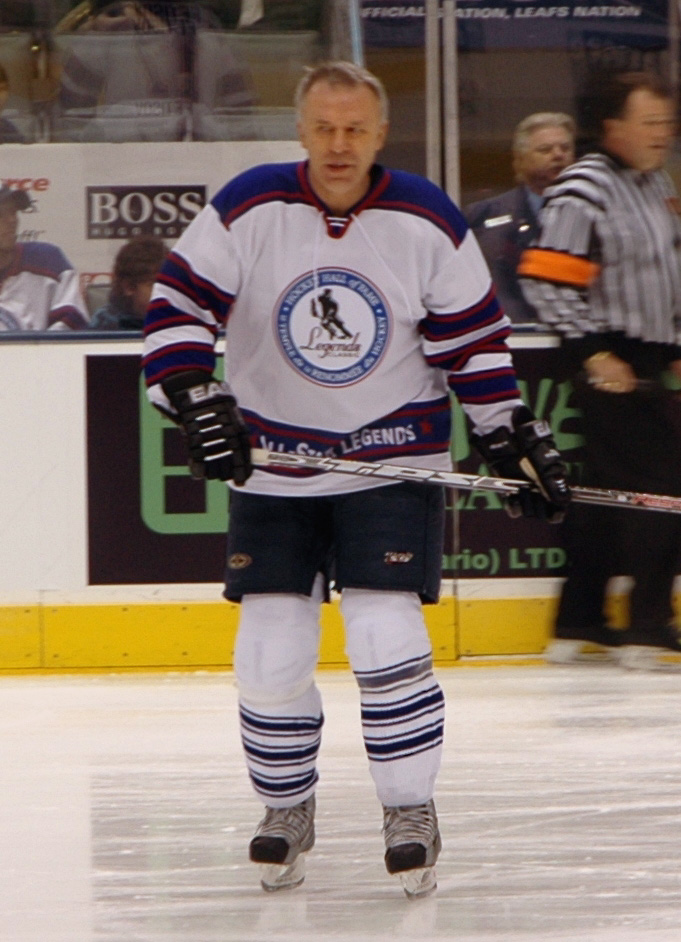
Viacheslav Fetisov

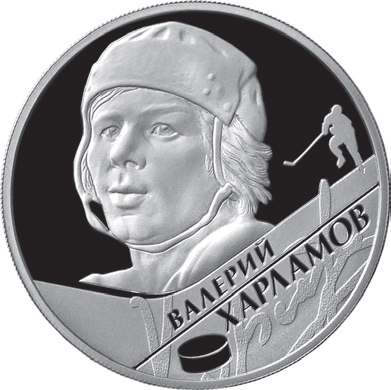
Valeri Kharlamov

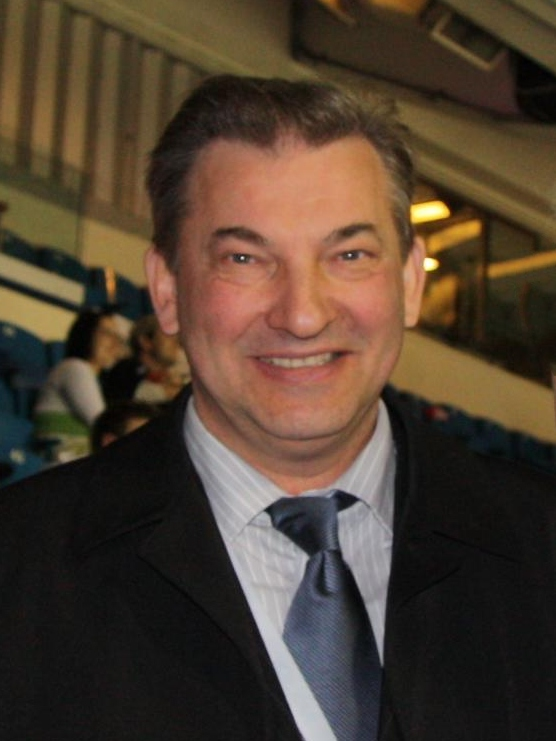
Vladislav Tretiak

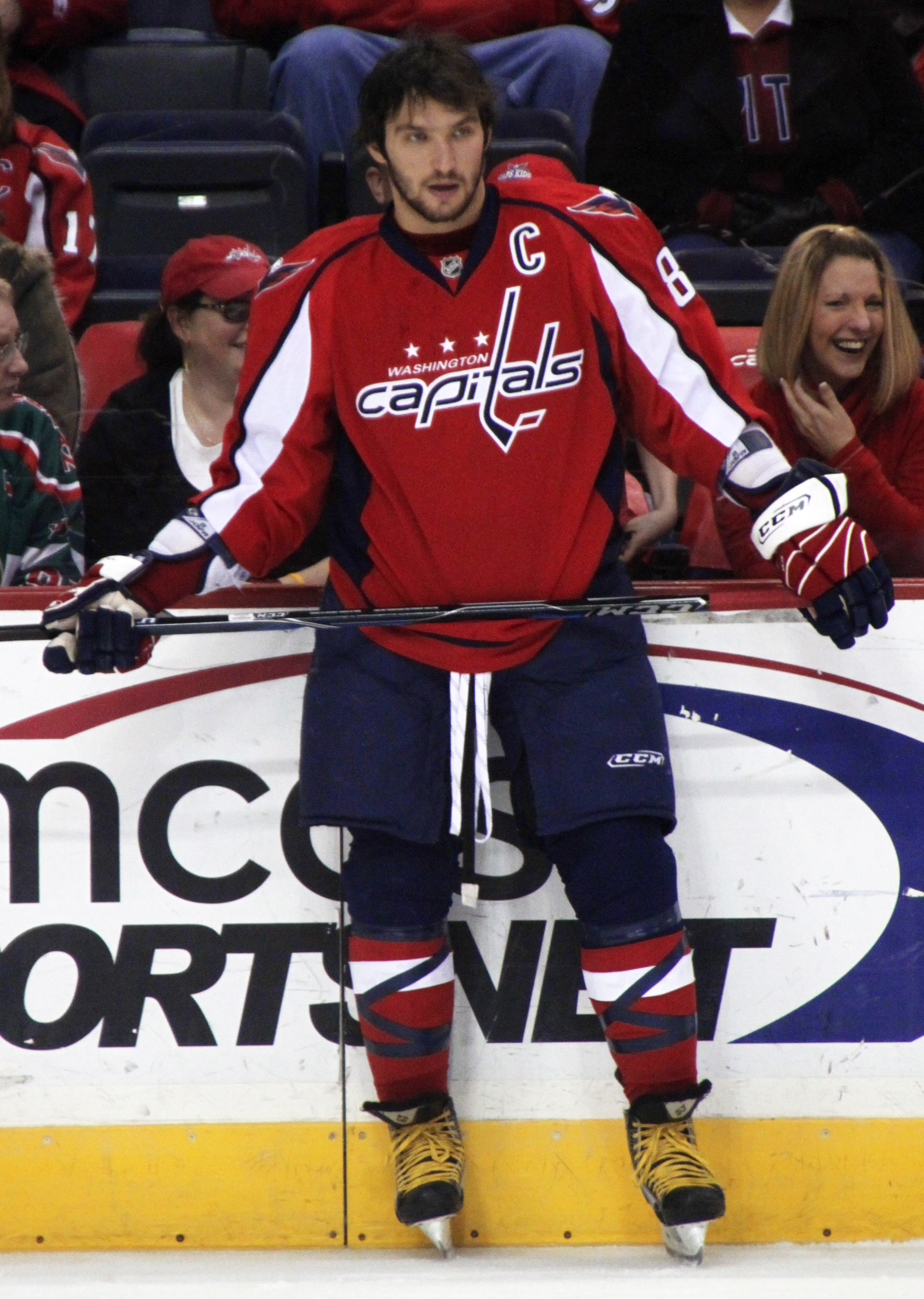
Alexander Ovechkin

- Maxim Afinogenov, NHL player
- Yevgeny Babich, Olympic gold medalist
- Ilya Bryzgalov, Phoenix Coyotes goalie, former NHL star
- Pavel Bure, NHL player
- Valeri Bure
- Pavel Datsyuk, NHL player
- Vitaly Davydov, 3-time Olympic gold medalist, World & European champion 1963–71, runner-up 1972
- Sergei Gonchar, NHL player
- Sergei Fedorov, NHL player
- Viacheslav Fetisov
- Kirill Kaprizov, NHL player
- Nikolai Khabibulin, NHL goalie
- Valeri Kharlamov, international ice hockey player
- Vladimir Konstantinov
- Ilya Kovalchuk, NHL player
- Alexei Kovalev
- Vyacheslav Kozlov
- Alfred Kuchevsky, Olympic champion 1956, bronze 1960; twice world champion
- Oleg Kvasha
- Igor Larionov
- Yuri Lyapkin (born 1945), ice hockey player, Soviet Hockey League, Olympic gold medal, Russian and Soviet Hockey Hall of Fame
- Evgeni Malkin, NHL player
- Sergei Makarov
- Andrei Markov
- Boris Mikhailov
- Alexander Ovechkin, NHL player
- Alexander Radulov, KHL player
- Semyon Varlamov, NHL goalie
- Vladimir Petrov
- Alexei Ponikarovsky
- Alexander Semin, NHL player
- Vladislav Tretiak, goalie
- Alexander Yakushev
- Alexie Yashin forward
- Yevgeni Zimin Olympic champion 1968–72, World & European champion 1968–69, 1971
- Viktor Zinger, Olympic champion 1968; world champion 1965–69
- Sergei Zubov

=== Motorsport ===
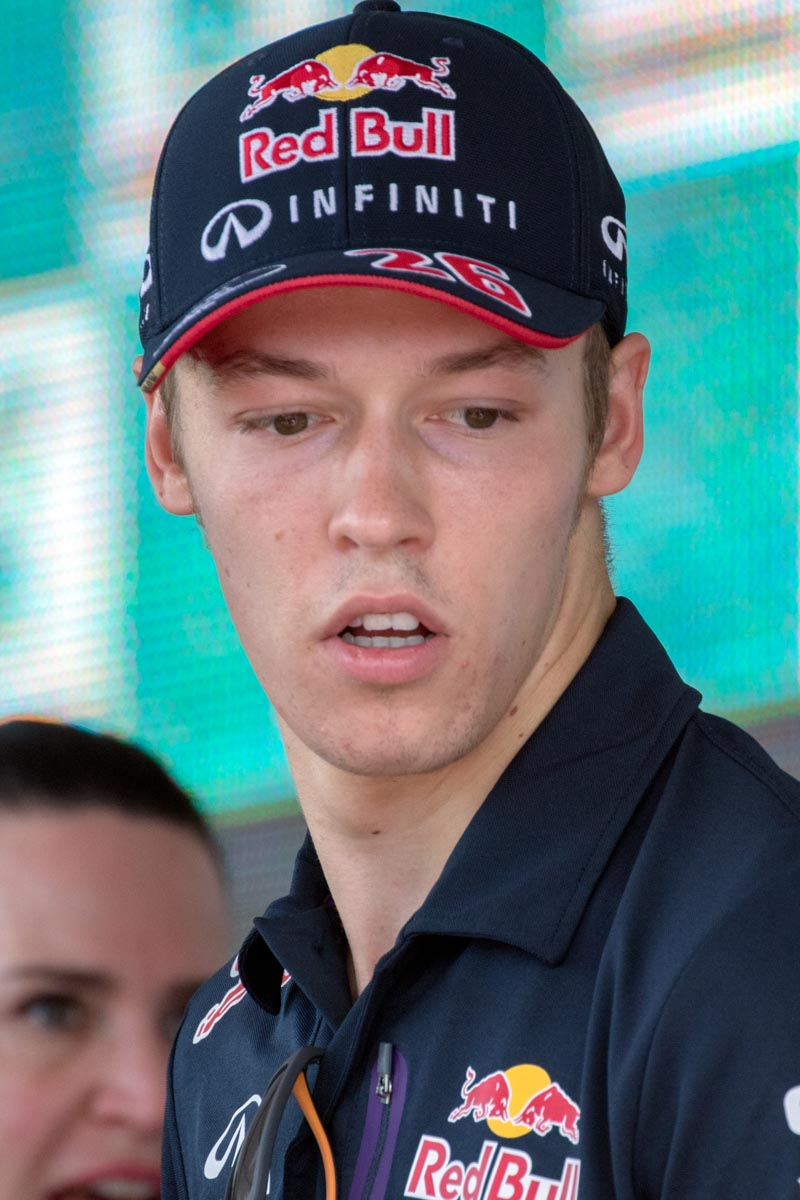
Daniil Kvyat

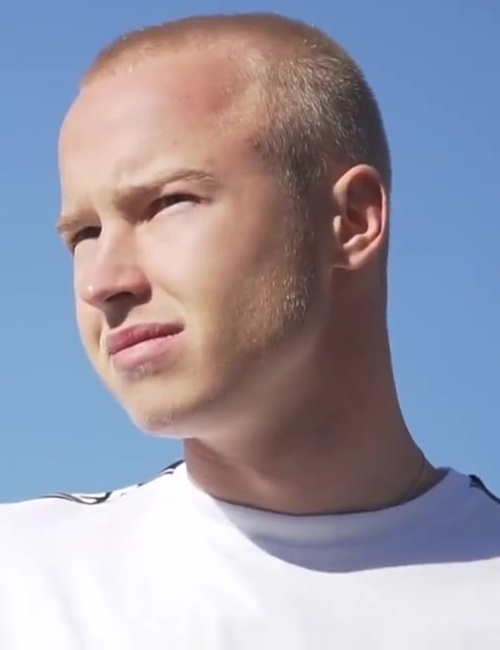
Nikita Mazepin

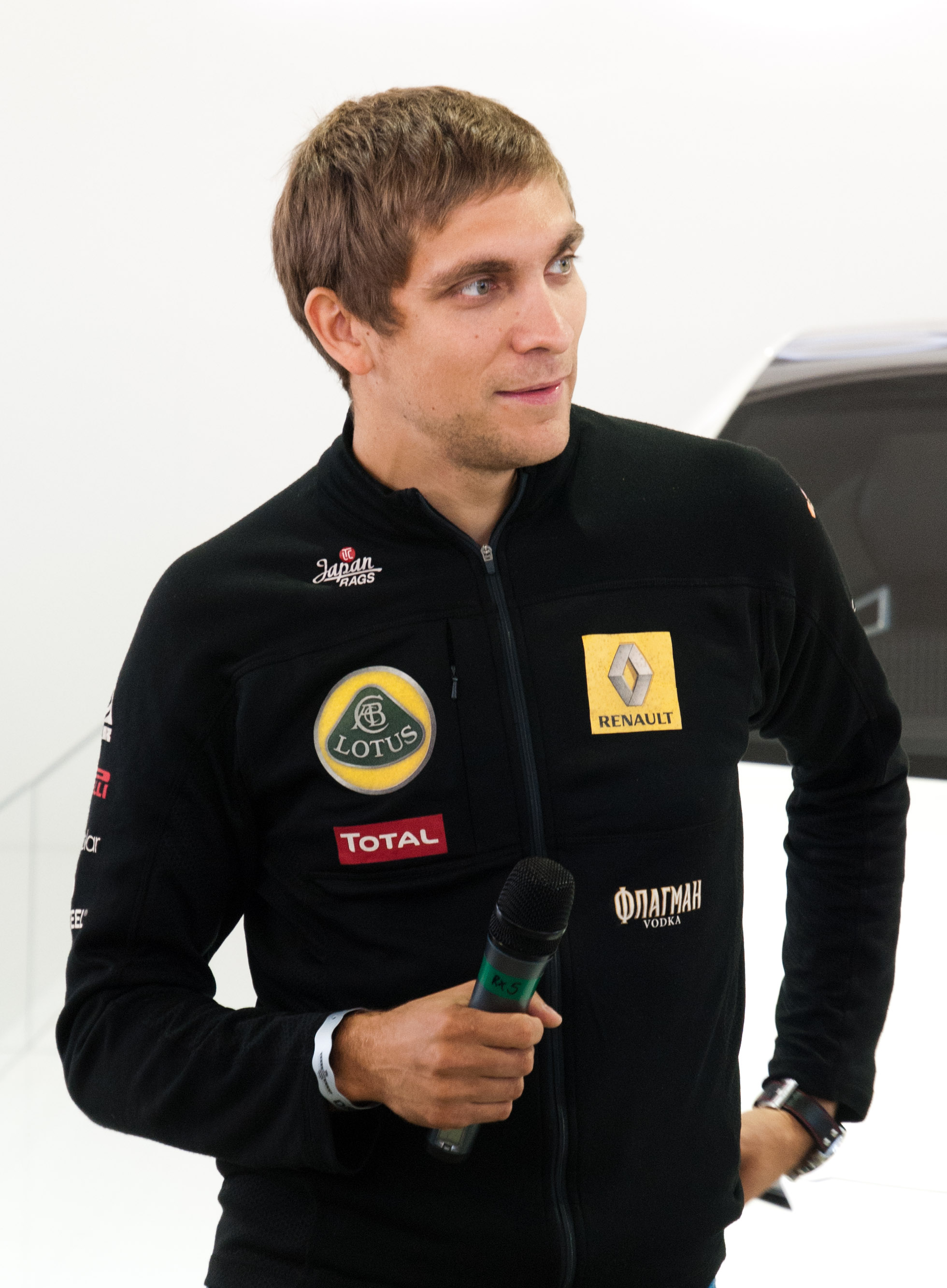
Vitaly Petrov

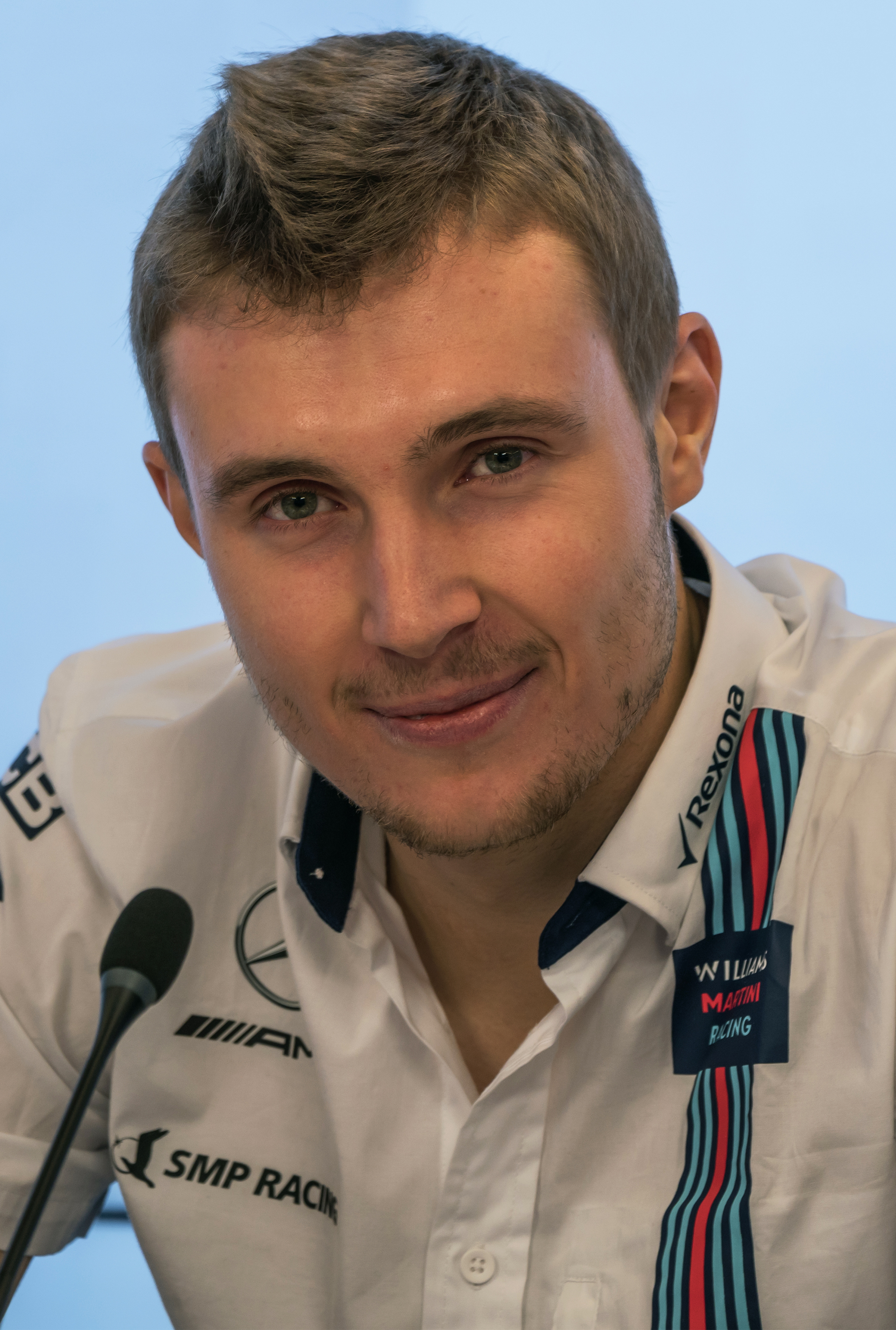
Sergey Sirotkin

- Daniil Kvyat, Formula One driver
- Nikita Mazepin, Formula One driver
- Vitaly Petrov, Formula One driver
- Sergey Sirotkin, Formula One driver

=== Association football players ===
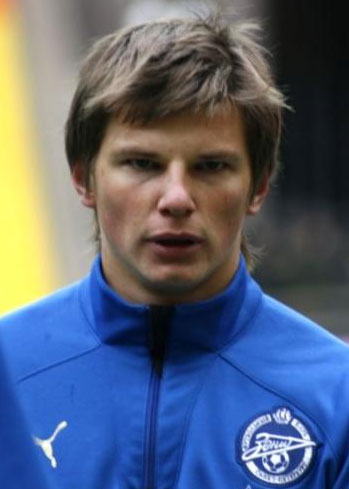
Andrei Arshavin

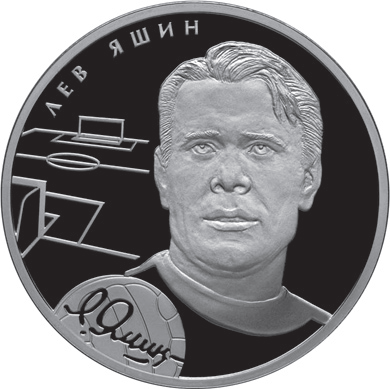
Lev Yashin

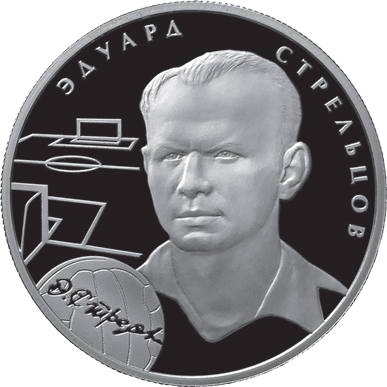
Eduard Streltsov

- Igor Akinfeev, goalkeeper
- Dmitri Alenichev, midfielder
- Andrei Arshavin, midfielder, striker
- Rashid Asanov, midfielder
- Vladimir Beschastnykh, striker
- Konstantin Beskov, striker, coach
- Grigori Bogemsky, striker
- Valentin Bubukin, midfielder, coach
- Mikhail Gershkovich (born 1948), striker, coach
- Valentin Ivanov, Sr., striker, coach
- Gavriil Kachalin, midfielder, coach
- Andrei Kanchelskis, midfielder
- Valery Karpin, midfielder, coach
- Dmitri Kharine, goalkeeper
- Rushan Khasanov, defender, midfielder, striker
- Shmuel Kozokin (born 1987), Israeli defender
- Gennady Logofet (1942–2011), footballer and football coach
- Aleksandr Mostovoi, midfielder
- Igor Netto, defender, coach
- Viktor Onopko, defender
- Sergei Ovchinnikov, goalkeeper, coach
- Roman Pavlyuchenko, striker
- Boris Razinsky (1933—2012), goalkeeper/striker, Olympic gold medal, manager
- Oleg Salenko, striker
- Nikita Simonyan, first vice-president of the Russian Football Union
- Eduard Streltsov, midfielder, striker
- Andrey Tikhonov, midfielder
- Arkadi Tyapkin (1895–1942), defender
- Lev Yashin (1929—1990), voted the best goalkeeper of the 20th century by the IFFHS
- Ivan Yegorov (1891–1943), striker
- Valery Voronin, midfielder
- Yuri Zhirkov (born 1983), defender, midfielder
- Mihail Titow, forward

=== Swimmers ===
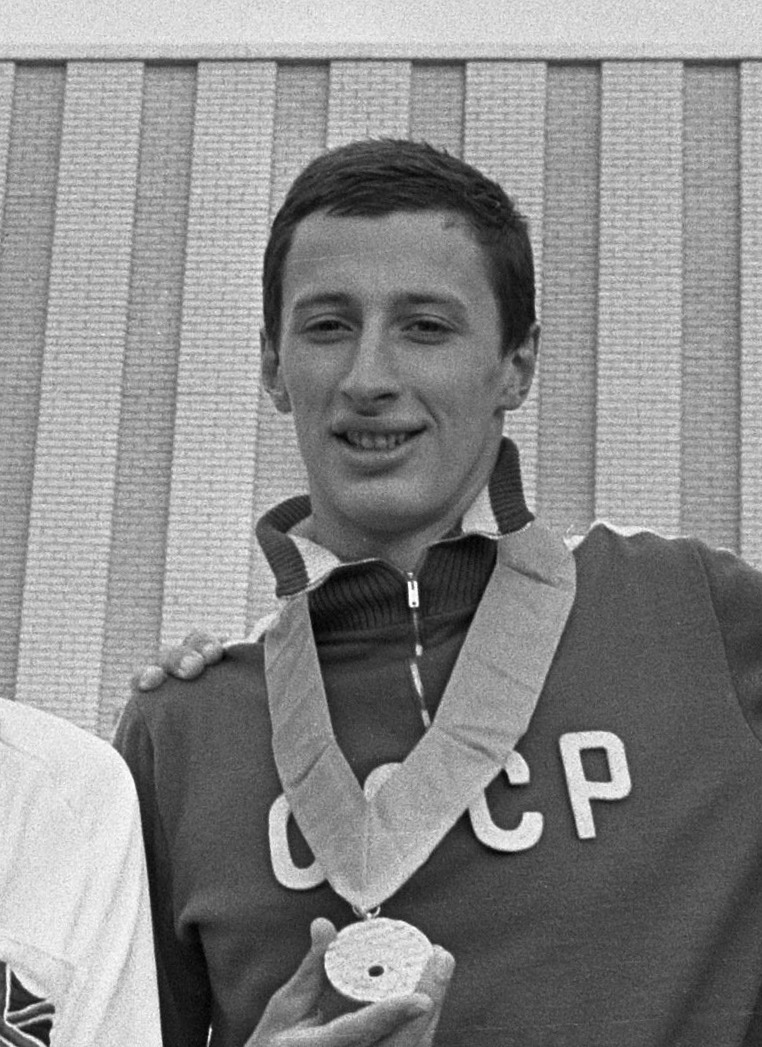
Semyon Belits-Geiman

- Semyon Belits-Geiman, Olympic freestyle swimmer
- Aleksandr Vladimirovich Popov, swimmer
- Yevgeny Sadovyi, freestyle swimmer

=== Tennis players ===
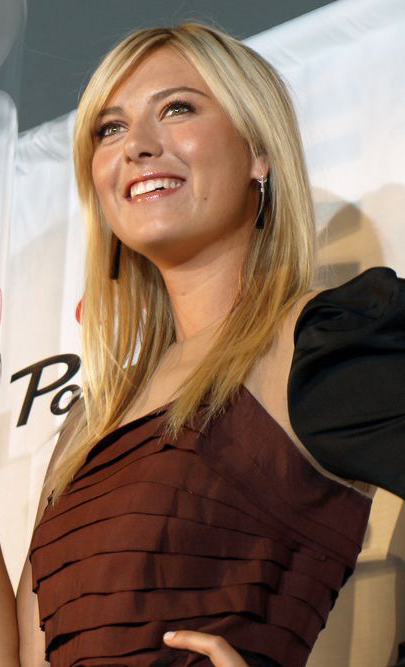
Maria Sharapova

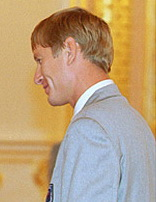
Yevgeny Kafelnikov

- Nikolay Davydenko, former consistent top 10 player
- Elena Dementieva, silver medal at the 2000 Summer Olympics and gold medal at the 2008 Summer Olympics
- Natela Dzalamidze (born 1993), tennis player, took on Georgian citizenship
- Yevgeny Kafelnikov, former world no. 1 tennis player
- Anna Kournikova, former top 10 tennis player
- Svetlana Kuznetsova, former world no. 2 tennis player; won the 2004 U.S. Open and 2009 French Open
- Evgenia Linetskaya (born 1986), Russian-born Israeli tennis player
- Anastasia Myskina, former world no. 2 tennis player; won the 2004 French Open (becoming the first Russian woman to win a grand slam title)
- Daniel Prenn (1904–1991), Russian-born German, Polish, and British world-top-ten tennis player
- Marat Safin, former world no. 1 tennis player; won 2000 U.S. Open and 2005 Australian Open.
- Dinara Safina, former world no. 1 ladies tennis player
- Maria Sharapova, former world no. 1 tennis player; won 2004 Wimbledon, 2006 U.S. Open, 2008 Australian Open, 2012 French Open and silver medal at the 2012 Summer Olympics
- Vera Zvonareva, two time Grand Slam finalist
- Daniil Medvedev, former world no. 1 tennis player and 2021 US Open champion

=== Weightlifters ===
- Vasily Alexeev, Olympic weightlifter, set 80 world records
- Yuri Vlasov, weightlifter, 1960 Olympic gold medalist
- Arkady Vorobyov, weightlifter, 2-time Olympic gold medalist
- Leonid Zhabotinsky, weightlifter, 2-time Olympic gold medalist

=== Wrestlers ===
- Boris Maksovich Gurevich, Olympic champion wrestler
- Alexander Karelin, wrestler
- Roho (Soslan Boradzov), wrestler
- Artem Surkov, Greco-Roman wrestler

=== Other sportspeople ===
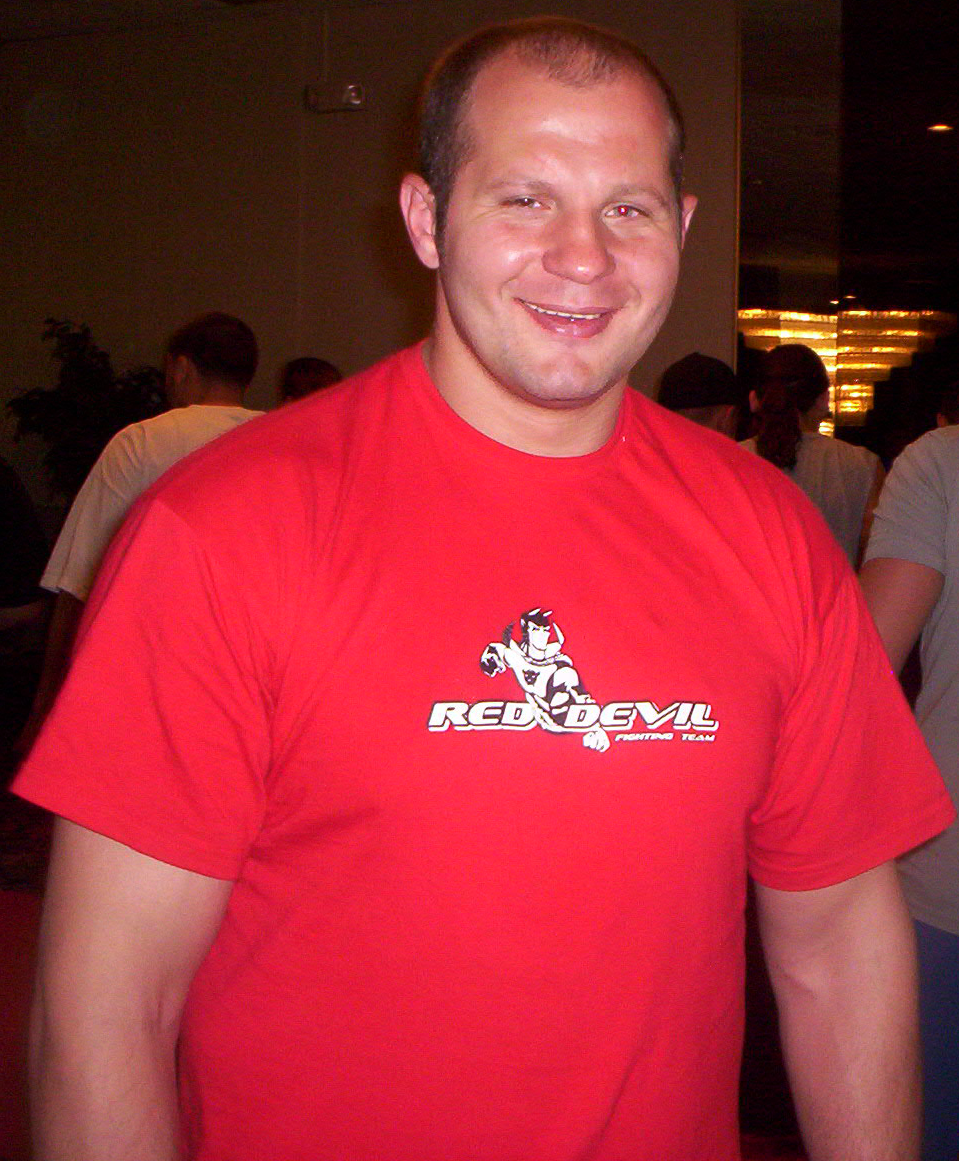
Fedor Emelianenko

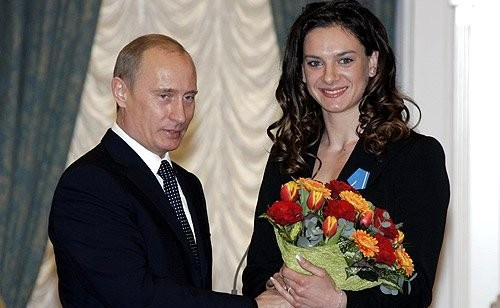
Yelena Isinbaeva

- Evgeny Abalakov, mountaineer
- Vitaly Abalakov, mountaineer
- Inga Artamonova, speed skater
- John Barsha, American football player
- Yuriy Borzakovskiy, middle-distance runner
- Anatoli Boukreev, mountaineer
- Fedor Emelianenko, MMA fighter
- Khabib Nurmagomedov, former UFC Lightweight Champion
- Islam Makhachev, current UFC Lightweight Champion and student of Khabib Nurmagomedov
- Lisa Cross, body builder
- Maria Leontyavna Itkina, sprinter
- Mikhail Mamistov, 2-time world champion acrobatic pilot
- Natalya Nazarova, sprinter
- Svetlana Kapanina, pilot
- Svetlana Krivelyova, shot putter
- Yelena Isinbayeva, pole vaulter, 2004 Olympic gold medalist
- Nina Romashkova, powered and glider aerobatic pilot
- Lidia Skoblikova, 2-time Olympic gold medalist speed skater
- Lev Vainshtein, shooter

== Activists and revolutionaries ==
- Marija Essen, Old Bolshevik revolutionary and writer
- Vera Karelina, labor activist
- Nikolay Koblyakov, Russian anti-Putin activist
- Elena Prushakevich, populist who typeset underground publications
- Olga Volkenstein, journalist and suffragist

== Legendary and folk heroes ==
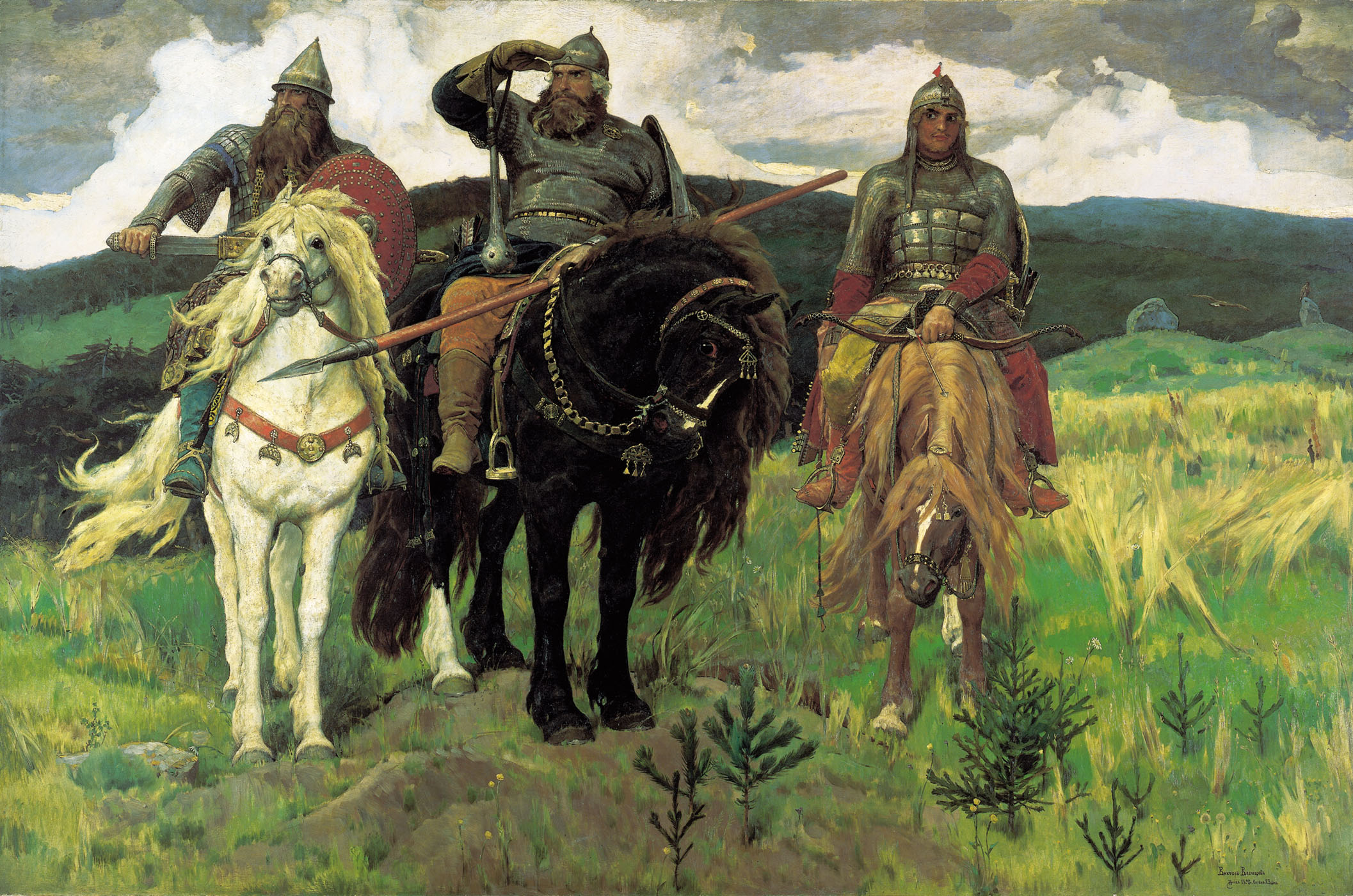
Dobrynya Nikitich, Ilya Muromets and Alyosha Popovich

- Alyosha Popovich, young and cunning bogatyr of priest origin, defeated the dragon Tugarin Zmeyevich by trickery
- Baba Yaga, witch-like character in Russian folklore, flies around on a giant mortar and lives in the cabin on chicken legs
- Dobrynya Nikitich, bogatyr of noble origin, defeated the dragon Zmey Gorynych
- Ilya Muromets, bogatyr of peasant origin, saint, the greatest of all the legendary bogatyrs, defeated the forest-dwelling monster Nightingale the Robber, defended Rus' from numerous attacks by the steppe people
- Ivan Tsarevich, typical noble protagonist of Russian fairy tales, often engaged in a struggle with Koschei and rescuing young girls
- Ivan the Fool, typical simple-minded but lucky protagonist of Russian fairy tales
- Koschei "the Deathless", chief male antagonist of Russian fairy tales, an ugly senile sorcerer and kidnapper of young maids, possesses immortality
- Nikita the Furrier, town craftsman who released the daughter of Prince Vladimir the Fair Sun from the dragon's captivity
- Sadko, musician and merchant from Veliky Novgorod, procured wealth and wife from the Sea Tsar by playing gusli
- Svyatogor, giant "sacred mountain" bogatyr, passed his strength to Ilya Muromets
- Vasilisa the Beautiful, young, attractive and often cunning heroine of Russian fairy tales

== Others ==
- Klavdiya Gadyuchkina(1910-2025), supercentenarian and oldest Russian person ever recorded

== See also ==
- History of Germans in Russia and the Soviet Union
- List of Chuvashs
- List of Jews from the Soviet Union
- List of people from Saint Petersburg
- List of people from Tambov
- List of Armenians
- List of Azerbaijanis
- List of Belarusians
- List of Georgians
- List of Karelians
- List of Kazakhs
- List of Tajiks
- List of Tatars
- List of Tuvans
- List of Ukrainians
- List of Uzbeks
