= Nikolay Koblyakov =

Nikolay Koblyakov (russian language: Николай Кобляков) is a Russian anti-Putin activist. From 1 August to ? November 2014, he was detained in Bulgaria, awaiting extradition to Russia, but extradition was refused by the Bulgarian authorities. His case has been compared to that of Baha Kimyongür, the subject of a Turkish Red Notice, who was detained for six months before being freed on the grounds that the notice was abusive.

== Biography ==
Koblyakov is a graduate of the London School of Economics; upon returning to Russia he created a chain of care homes for the elderly, which proved profitable. He was ousted from business by competitors who were backed by the Putin regime. Upon this, he established himself in Paris, where he was a founding member of Russie-Libertés, an NGO campaigning for Russian democracy.

Koblyakov protested against the detainment of Pussy Riot, against the 2014 Winter Olympics in Sochi and participated in a public demonstration outside the National Assembly in Paris when Vladimir Putin dined with President Hollande in context of the 2014 D-Day anniversary.

in 2010 Nikolai Koblyakov had left Moscow for Paris, Koblyakov was called on as a witness in an investigation. he quotes himself saying "You enter as a witness, and leave a suspect." When he was arrested on the 6th of July he learned a lot about his governments reach. He was set on charges that were "politically motivated".

The day after Koblyakov was released, Russia would continuously pressure France to extradite him under a separate bilateral treaty.

On 1 April 2014, an internal arrest order was published by Interpol for "swindling", a crime which he is supposed to have committed between December 2004 and September 2005 in France, involving a company called Stankimport. Although French courts had dismissed the charges, Russia managed to secure the Red Notice. In spite of this, he encountered no judicial problems in lands he visited, including Portugal, Latvia, Germany, the Czech Republic, Greece and the UK. Still, on 29 July he was arrested in Bulgaria and forbidden to leave the country. On 1 September 2014, he was put under house arrest. Koblyakov described the Russian dossier which he was presented as "a story which happened to be the fiction mixed of the real facts and of the totally invented events."

On 3 September 2014, there was a request for Nikolay to be Extradited but Bulgaria has refused under the terms provided. When it was rejected he requested political asylum in order to not be put in a regular prison

Sofia City Court declined on 21 October 2014 to extradite Koblyakov. The Court had rejected Russia's request to extradite Nikolay Koblyakov because it was still not clear why he was wanted and, according to the prosecutor, civil liberties of the activist being sought by Moscow might be persecuted there.

On 11 June 2015, Koblyakov was arrested in Paris because of the renewed extradition request from Moscow and forbidden to leave France.

On 8 July 2015, INTERPOL deleted a Red Notice in Koblyakov's name as they concluded that the request by the Russian Federation was politically motivated and that the execution of the warrant would jeopardise his human rights.

On November 4, 2015 the Tribunal of Paris rejected the extradition to Russia of Nikolai Koblyakov.
