= Leon Zernitsky =

Leon Zernitsky was born in Russia in 1949. He graduated from Moscow Polygraphic Institute (Moscow Fine Art and Design University), one of the country’s premier art colleges, where he earned his MFA. Zernitsky enjoyed a successful career as illustrator and fine artist creating art for international magazines, book publishers and major corporations around the globe. His work has been exhibited at art galleries and fairs around the world and he has received numerous awards including: Communication Arts (USA), Print (USA), Applied Arts (Canada), CAPIC (Canada).

Although he is trained in classical methods of painting he likes to paint influenced by Russian avant-garde artists. The influences of Chagall, Kandinsky, and Malevich that reflect in his art are made by the imagery, harmonious compositions, and colors. Leon works in experimental art and continues to develop his style.

He now lives in Toronto, Ontario, Canada.

== Sources ==
- Art of Leon Zernitsky
- http://www.artofthechip.com/about_leon.html
- http://www.toronto.net/Artists_and_Performers.html
- http://www.artofthechip.com/home.html
- http://www.google.ca/search?q=leon+zernitsky&hl=en&tbo=1&tbs=bks:1&ei=T7pgTJOZOsP58AaEs5GpCg&start=0&sa=N
- http://www.spu.edu/depts/uc/response/autumn2k7/features/global-christianity2.asp
- http://www.artanddesignonline.com/Member_template/member_temp_portfolio.php?p=772&m=22744&bc=Browse&sub=21&v=products&pagename=browse_results_page2.php&PageSize=120&CurrentPage=2&sortBy=Title&TotalSize=&totalitems=522&L=1
