= Ivan Yegorov =

Russian footballer

Personal information
- Full name: Ivan Vasilyevich Yegorov
- Date of birth: 1891
- Date of death: 1943 (aged 51–52)
- Position: Striker

Senior career*
Years	Team	Apps	(Gls)
1906	Natsionaly Saint Petersburg		
1907–1914	Sport Saint Petersburg		
1920–1922	KSK Kyiv		
1923	V.I. Lenin Club Kyiv		

International career
1913	Russia	1	(0)
- * Club domestic league appearances and goals

Ivan Vasilyevich Yegorov (Russian: Иван Васильевич Егоров) (born 1891; died 1943) was an association football player.

== International career ==
Yegorov played his only game for Russia on May 4, 1913 in a friendly against Sweden.
