= Second Hand Band =

Russian Band

Second Hand Band is a musical group from Moscow, Russia. Second Hand Band was formed in 1999 and plays "Russian roots with Caribbean fruits" music, mixing various acoustic instruments with a mass of electronics. Their compositions often feature tabla and vibes, guitars and sitar, trumpet and harmonica with a slow beat (around 100 bpm) and mellow singing.

== Discography ==
- Ancient EP, Monoscript records, (2000)
- Drops, \Monoscript records, (2000)
- Dubbuterfly, (Экзотика records, 2003)
- Nightingale in a town

== Cinema, theater and video ==
The band has released soundtracks for Russian films Manga (2005), Boomer (2003), Gololed (2002) and TV-series Soldiers (2004).
