= Russo-Turkish War (1877–1878) order of battle: Ottoman Navy =

This is the order of battle for the Ottoman Navy during the 1877–1878 Russo-Turkish War.

Thiolu

  - İşkodra, Böğürtlen
- Rusçuk
  - Hizber, Hayreddin, Aziziye, Seyyar, Sofya, Islahat, Niş, Şehbaz-i Bahri, Vidin
- Tutrakan
  - Şevket Nüma
- Silistre
  - Semendire, Feth-ül Islam, Arkadi, Akka, Kılıç Ali's list includes fleet organisations of the Ottoman Navy during the Russo-Ottoman War of 1877–1878.

== Dispositions in 1877 ==
In 1877, the naval ships of the Ottoman Navy were disposed as follows:

Mediterranean Fleet

- 1st Fleet (Volos)
  - Mahmûdiye, Asar-i Şevket, Bursa, Resmo
- 2nd Fleet (Crete)
  - Azîziye, Mukaddeme-i Hayır, Iclaliye, Libnan, Muzaffer, Edirne
- 3rd Fleet (Preveza)
  - Orhâniye, Muîn-i Zafer, Asar-i Tevfik, Sinop

Bosporus Fleet

- Mesudiye, Osmaniye, Feth-i Bülend, Sürur, İzzeddin, Kandiye, Talia, Istanbul

Constantinople

- Avnillah, Necm-i Şevket, Selimiye, Hüdâvendigâr

Guard vessels

- Fethiye (Büyükdere), Şadiye (Golden Horn), Mansûre (Smyrna)

Under repair at Tersâne-i Âmire

- Tahir-i Bahri, Peyk-i Şevket, Kosova, Peyk-i Zafer, Ertuğrul, Hizber, Kandiye, Akadiye, Eser-i Nusret, İsmail, İskenderiye

== Fleet organisation in March 1877 ==
In March 1877, the Ottoman Navy was structured as follows:

Black Sea Fleet (Ferik Bozcaadalı Hasan Hüsnü Pasha)

- Black Sea Ironclad Squadron (Liva Mustafa Pasha)
  - Âsâr-ı Tevfik, Orhaniye, Âsâr-ı Şevket, Necm-i Şevket, Iclâliye, Feth-i Bülend, Muin-i Zafer, Avnillah
- Black Sea Wooden Hulled Squadron (Liva Ahmed Pasha)
  - Hüdavendigâr, Mubir-i Sürur, Sinop, Muzaffer, Izmir, Edirne, Asır, Ismail, Mecidiye

Mediterranean Fleet (Ferik Giritli Hüseyin Pasha)

- Mediterranean Ironclad Squadron (Milalay Faik Bey)
  - Mesudiye, Aziziye, Osmaniye, Mahmudiye, Mukaddeme-i Hayır
- Mediterranean Wooden Hulled Squadron (Liva Hasan Pasha)
  - Selimiye, Mansure, Utarit, Eser-i Cedîd, Sehir, Taif, Fevaid, Talia

Bosporus Squadron

- Fethiye, Izzeddin, Kandiye, Hanya, Medar-i Zafer, Âsâr-ı Nusret

Danube Squadron (Ferik Mehmet Arif Pasha)

- Lütf-ü Celîl, Hıfz-ür Rahman, Hizber, Seyfi, Semendire, Feth-ül Islam, Böğürtlen, İşkodra, Podgoriçe, Akka, Varna, Şevket Nüma, Sultaniye, Mürvet-i Nusret, Mesir-i Bahri, Feyz-i Bahri, Serafeddin, Medar-i Tevfik, Kayseriye, Batum, Selânik, Mersin, Lütfiye, Pursut, Canik, Kılıç Ali

Ottoman Danube Steamship Company (İdare-i Nehriye)

- Hüseyin, Nüzhet, Arkadi, Islahat, Rusçuk, Aziziye, Seyyar, Lom, Vidin, Niş, Ziştovi, Sofya, Seyyar

== Danube Squadron ==
In 1877, Danube Squadron of the Ottoman Navy was disposed as follows:

April 27, 1877

- Vidin
  - Varna, Ziştovi
- Lom
  - Rusçuk
- Rahova (present day: Oryahovo)
  - Podgoriçe
- Niğbolu (present day: Nikopol)
  - İşkodra, Böğürtlen
- Rusçuk (present day: Ruse)
  - Aziziye, Seyyar, Sofya, Islahat, Lom, Vidin, Niş
- Tutrakan
  - Hizber, Şevket Nüma, Semendire, Arkadi
- Silistre (present day: Silistra)
  - Kılıç Ali, Akka, Nüzhetiye, Şehbaz-i Bahri

July 10, 1877

- Vidin
  - Varna, Ziştovi
- Rahova
  - Podgoriçe
- Niğb'
