= Feth-i Bülend-class ironclad =

19th-century class of Ottoman ironclads

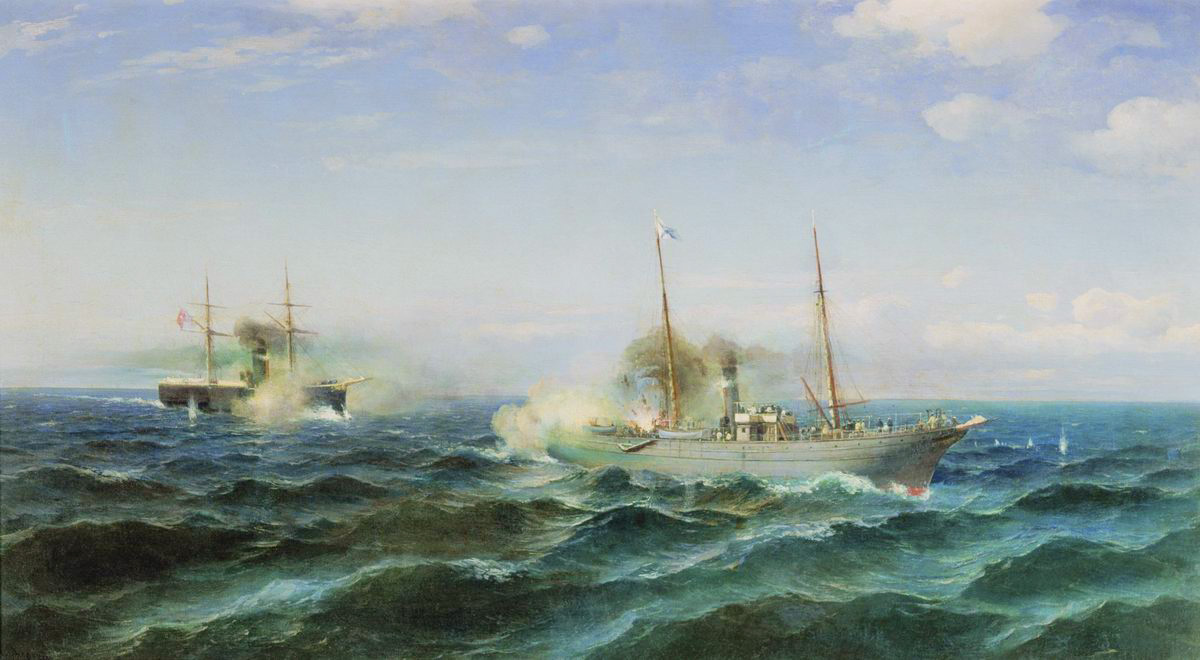
- Painting depicting Feth-i Bülend's (left) battle with Vesta (center)

Class overview
- Operators: Ottoman Empire
- Preceded by: Avnillah-class ironclad
- Succeeded by: Ottoman ironclad Iclaliye
- Built: 1868–1874
- In commission: 1870–1923
- Completed: 2
- Scrapped: 2

General characteristics
- Type: Central battery ship
- Displacement: 2,762 metric tons (2,718 long tons)
- Length: 72 m (236 ft 3 in) (p.p.)
- Beam: 11.9 m (39 ft 1 in)
- Draft: 5.2 m (17 ft 1 in)
- Installed power: 3,250 ihp (2,420 kW); 6 × box boilers
- Propulsion: 1 × compound steam engine; 1 × screw propeller
- Speed: 13 knots (24 km/h; 15 mph)
- Complement: 16 officers, 153 sailors
- Armament: 4 × 229 mm (9 in) Armstrong guns
- Armor: Belt: 229 mm; Casemate: 229 mm

The Feth-i Bülend class was a class of two ironclad warships built for the Ottoman Navy in the 1860s and 1870s. The lead ship, Feth-i Bülend, was built in Britain, and served as the basis for the second, Mukaddeme-i Hayir, which was built in the Ottoman Imperial Arsenal. The design for the ships was based on the earlier Avnillah class, which were also built in Britain. Central battery ships, Feth-i Bülend and Mukaddeme-i Hayir were armed with a battery of four 222 mm (8.7 in) Armstrong guns in a casemate.

Both ships served during the Russo-Turkish War of 1877–1878, where they operated against Russian forces in the Black Sea. Feth-i Bülend fought a Russian vessel in an inconclusive battle, and both ships supported an amphibious assault on the port of Sokhumi. After the war, both vessels were placed in reserve, and saw no further activity until 1897, when they were mobilized at the start of the Greco-Turkish War. Like the rest of the Ottoman fleet, both ships were in poor condition and were unable to be used offensively. After the war ended, Feth-i Bülend was rebuilt, but Mukaddeme-i Hayir was too badly deteriorated to merit reconstruction. Feth-i Bülend served as a guard ship in Salonika during the First Balkan War, where she was sunk by a Greek torpedo boat in October 1912. Mukaddeme-i Hayir survived, first as a training ship, and then as a barracks ship, until 1923, when she was broken up.

== Design ==
In 1861, Abdülaziz became sultan of the Ottoman Empire, and thereafter began a construction program to strengthen the Ottoman Navy, which had incurred heavy losses during the Crimean War of 1853–1856. He ordered several ironclad warships from shipyards in Britain and France, though the program was limited by the Ottoman Empire's weak finances. The Navy ordered Feth-i Bülend from the Thames Iron Works in 1867. The design for the Feth-i Bülend class was based on the earlier Avnillah class, both of which were built at the same shipyard. A second member of the class, Mukaddeme-i Hayir, was ordered from the Imperial Arsenal in 1868. The rapid pace of naval development in the 1860s and 1870s rendered the design obsolescent by the time they entered service, as gun power increased and more modern armor types were developed to counter the more powerful artillery.

=== Characteristics ===
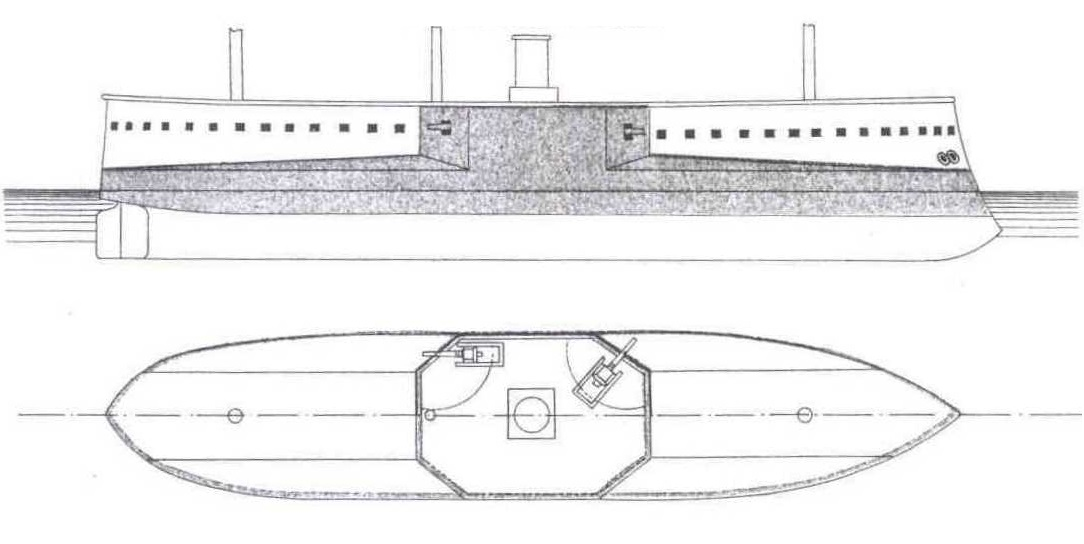
Line-drawing of Feth-i Bülend

The ships of the Feth-i Bülend class were 72.01 m (236 ft 3 in) long between perpendiculars, with a beam of 11.99 m (39 ft 4 in) and a draft of 5.51 m (18 ft 1 in). Their hulls was constructed with iron, and displaced 2,762 metric tons (2,718 long tons) normally and 1,601 t (1,576 long tons) BOM. They had a crew of 16 officers and 153 enlisted men.

The ships were powered by a single horizontal compound steam engine which drove one screw propeller. Steam was provided by six coal-fired box boilers that were trunked into a single funnel amidships. The engine was rated at 3,250 indicated horsepower (2,420 kW) and produced a top speed of 13 knots (24 km/h; 15 mph), though by 1877 Feth-i Bülend was only capable of 10 knots (19 km/h; 12 mph). Decades of poor maintenance had reduced both ships' speed to 8 knots (15 km/h; 9.2 mph) by 1892. The Feth-i Bülend-class ships carried 600 t (590 long tons; 660 short tons) of coal. A supplementary sailing rig was also fitted.

Feth-i Bülend and Mukaddeme-i Hayir were armed with a battery of four 222 mm (8.7 in) muzzle-loading Armstrong guns mounted in a central, armored casemate, two guns per side. The guns were positioned so as to allow any two to fire directly ahead, astern, or to either broadside. The casemate had heavy armor protection, with the gun battery protected by 222 mm of iron plating. The upper section of the casemate had thinner armor, at 150 mm (5.9 in) thick. The hull had a complete armored belt at the waterline, which extended 0.6 m (2 ft) above the line and 1.2 m (4 ft) below. The above-water portion was 222 mm thick, while the submerged part was 150 mm thick.

=== Modifications ===
In 1882, Mukaddeme-i Hayir received a light secondary battery consisting of a pair of 87 mm (3.4 in) Krupp guns, two 63 mm (2.5 in) guns, two 37 mm (1.5 in) guns, and two 25.4 mm (1 in) gun. Feth-i Bülend received the same battery of guns in 1890, less one of the Nordenfelt guns. Feth-i Bülend received a much more significant reconstruction in 1903–1907 from Ansaldo in Genoa. The ship was reboilered with a pair of water-tube boilers manufactured by the Imperial Arsenal, which improved speed slightly to 9 knots (17 km/h; 10 mph). Her armament was completely replaced with new, quick-firing guns manufactured by Krupp. Four 15 cm SK L/40 guns were mounted in the casemate, and six 75 mm (3 in) guns and six 57 mm (2.2 in) guns were installed on the upper deck. Her crew was also increased to 220.

== Ships ==
Ship	Builder	Laid down	Launched	Completed
Feth-i Bülend	Thames Iron Works	May 1868	1869	1870
Mukaddeme-i Hayir	Imperial Arsenal	1870	28 October 1872	1874

== Service history ==
After she entered service, Feth-i Bülend was sent to Crete to assist in stabilizing the island in the aftermath of the Cretan Revolt of 1866–1869, but the Ottoman fleet, under Hobart Pasha, remained largely inactive during this period. Both ships saw extensive use during the Russo-Turkish War of 1877–1878, where they operated against Russian forces in the Black Sea. They were primarily occupied with bombarding Russian coastal positions in support of the Ottoman army in the Caucasus. They also supported an amphibious assault on the port of Sokhumi in May 1877. On 23 July, Feth-i Bülend engaged the Russian armed steamer Vesta in an inconclusive action that left both vessels lightly damaged before Vesta escaped. By this time, Mukaddeme-i Hayir had been transferred to Sulina at the mouth of the Danube to assist in the defense of the port; in November, she and several other ironclads disrupted a Russian attempt to mine the outer harbor.

After the war, both vessels were laid up in Constantinople. They were modernized slightly in the early 1880s. At the start of the Greco-Turkish War in February 1897, the Ottomans inspected the fleet and found that almost all of the vessels, including both Feth-i Bülend-class ships, to be completely unfit for combat against the Greek Navy. Following the end of the war with Greece, the government decided to begin a naval reconstruction program. Mukaddeme-i Hayir was ultimately not reconstructed, but Feth-i Bülend was rebuilt by Ansaldo in Genoa between 1903 and 1907. Feth-i Bülend served as a guard ship in Salonika during the Italo-Turkish War of 1911–1912 and the First Balkan War of 1912. During the latter conflict, her guns were removed to strengthen the land defenses of the port, and she was sunk there by a Greek torpedo boat on 31 October 1912. From 1911, Mukaddeme-i Hayir was used in secondary roles, first as a training ship and after 1914 as a barracks ship. She was ultimately decommissioned in 1923 and broken up for scrap.
