= Ottoman ironclad Iclaliye =

Ironclad warship of the Ottoman Navy

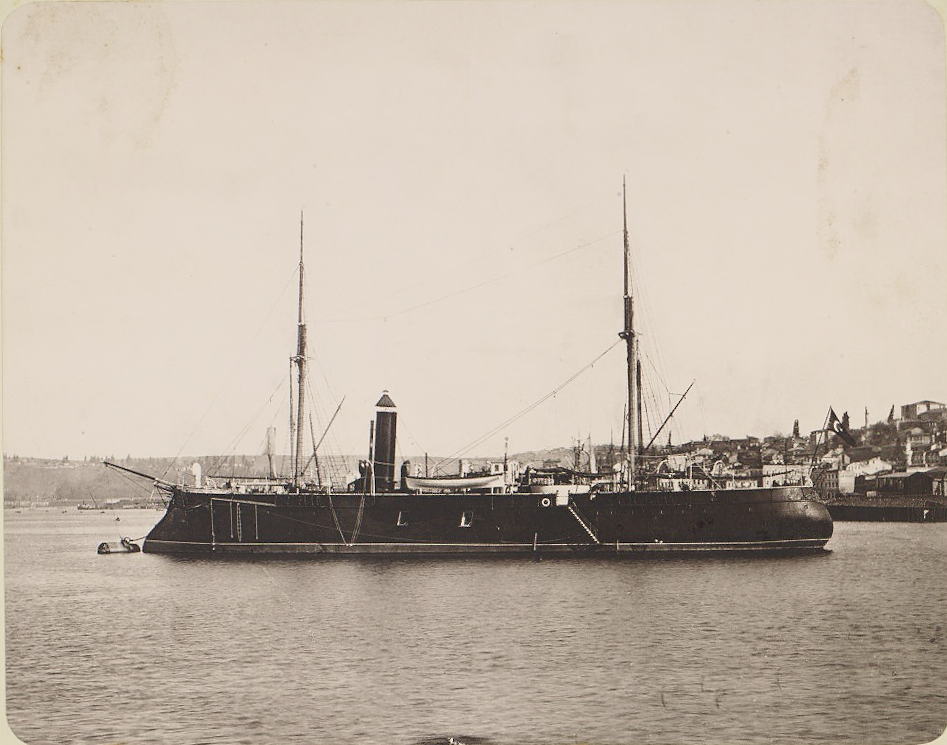
- Iclaliye in the Golden Horn

Class overview
- Name: Iclaliye class
- Operators: Ottoman Navy
- Preceded by: Feth-i Bülend class
- Succeeded by: Mesudiye

History

Ottoman Empire
- Name: Iclaliye
- Namesake: "Glorious"
- Builder: Stabilimento Tecnico Triestino
- Laid down: May 1868
- Launched: 1869
- Commissioned: February 1871
- Decommissioned: 1928
- Fate: Broken up, 1928

General characteristics
- Type: Central battery ship
- Displacement: 2,228 metric tons (2,193 long tons)
- Length: 66 m (216 ft 6 in) (loa)
- Beam: 12.8 m (42 ft)
- Draft: 4.8 m (15 ft 9 in)
- Installed power: 2 × box boilers; 1,800 indicated horsepower (1,300 kW)
- Propulsion: 1 × compound steam engine; 1 × screw propeller
- Speed: 12 knots (22 km/h; 14 mph)
- Complement: 16 officers; 132 enlisted men
- Armament: 2 × 228 mm (9 in) Armstrong guns; 3 × 178 mm (7 in) Armstrong guns
- Armor: Belt: 114 to 152 millimeters (4.5 to 6 in); Casemate: 114 mm; Barbette: 127 millimeters (5 in)

Iclaliye ("Glorious") was a unique ironclad warship built for the Ottoman Navy in the late 1860s and early 1870s. She was ordered from the Austro-Hungarian shipyard Stabilimento Tecnico Triestino, was laid down in May 1868, and was completed in February 1871. The design for Iclaliye was based on the earlier Asar-i Şevket-class ironclads built in France, though she carried a slightly more powerful armament consisting of two 228 mm (9 in) Armstrong guns and three 178 mm (7 in) Armstrong guns. During the Russo-Turkish War she supported Ottoman forces fighting in the Caucasus. She spent most of the rest her career out of service, as the Ottoman Navy was allowed to languish. In 1912, the Navy activated the ancient Iclaliye to help provide artillery support to the forces defending Constantinople. She served in subsidiary roles, including as a training ship and a barracks ship, until 1928 when she was decommissioned and broken up.

== Design ==
In the early 1860s, the Eyalet of Egypt, a province of the Ottoman Empire, ordered a series of ironclad warships from foreign shipyards. Iclaliye was the last vessel to be ordered by the Egyptian government. The contract was awarded to the Stabilimento Tecnico Triestino shipyard in Trieste, then part of the Austro-Hungarian Empire in 1868. By this time, Egyptian efforts to assert their independence had angered Sultan Abdülaziz, who on 5 June 1867 demanded Egypt surrender all of the ironclads ordered from foreign shipyards. After lengthy negotiations, Egypt surrendered Iclaliye and the other Egyptian ironclads in exchange for the central government recognizing greater autonomy, transforming the Eyalet into the Khedivate of Egypt. Iclaliye was a slightly enlarged version of the earlier Asar-i Şevket-class ironclads that had been built in France, carrying a slightly more powerful armament.

=== Characteristics ===
Iclaliye was 63.6 m (208 ft 8 in) long between perpendiculars and 66 m (216 ft 6 in) long overall. She had a beam of 12.8 m (42 ft) and a draft of 4.8 m (15 ft 9 in). Her hulls was constructed with iron, and displaced 2,228 metric tons (2,193 long tons) normally and 1,650 t (1,620 long tons; 1,820 short tons) BOM. She had a crew of 16 officers and 132 enlisted men as completed, and her enlisted crew increased to 180 by 1891.

The ship was powered by a single horizontal compound steam engine which drove one screw propeller. Steam was provided by two coal-fired box boilers manufactured by Stabilimento Tecnico Triestino, which were trunked into a single funnel amidships. The engine was rated at 1,800 indicated horsepower (1,300 kW) and produced a top speed of 12 knots (22 km/h; 14 mph) on sea trials, though by 1877 she was only capable of 10 knots (19 km/h; 12 mph). Decades of poor maintenance had reduced both ships' speed to 6 knots (11 km/h; 6.9 mph) by 1896. Iclaliye carried 250 t (250 long tons; 280 short tons) of coal. A supplementary sailing rig with two masts was also fitted.

Iclaliye was armed with a battery of two 228 mm (9 in) muzzle-loading Armstrong guns and three 178 mm (7 in) Armstrong guns. The 228 mm guns and two of the 178 mm guns were mounted in a central, armored casemate, one gun of each caliber per side. The third 178 mm gun was placed atop the casemate in a revolving barbette mount. In 1885, these guns were replaced by a 150 mm (5.9 in) 22-caliber Krupp gun in the barbette mount and a pair of 278 mm (10.9 in) Krupp guns in the casemate. A secondary battery of light guns was also added, which included two 87 mm (3.4 in) Krupp breech-loading guns, two 63.7 mm (2.51 in) Krupp breech-loaders, two 37 mm (1.5 in) Hotchkiss revolver cannon, and two 25.4 mm (1 in) Nordenfelt guns. By 1905, the 150 mm gun and the 63.7 mm weapons were removed.

The ship was protected with wrought iron armor plate. She had a complete armored belt at the waterline, which extended 2 meters (6 ft 6 in) above the waterline and 2 meters (6 ft) below. The portion above water was 152 millimeters (6 in) thick, while the portion below was 114 millimeters (4.5 in) thick. The casemate battery was protected with 114 mm of iron, with 102 millimeters (4 in) transverse bulkheads on either end. Her barbette mounting was protected by 127 millimeters (5 in) of iron.

== Service history ==
Iclaliye, meaning "Glorious", had had her keel laid in May 1868; she was formally transferred to the Ottoman Empire on 29 August 1868, and she was launched the following year. On 25 January 1871, Iclaliye began sea trials, and she was ready to be commissioned the following month. Early in the ship's career, the Ottoman ironclad fleet was activated every summer for short cruises from the Golden Horn to the Bosporus to ensure their propulsion systems were in operable condition.

=== Russo-Turkish War ===
The Ottoman fleet began mobilizing in September 1876 to prepare for a conflict with Russia, as tensions with the country had been growing for several years, an insurrection had begun in Ottoman Bosnia in mid-1875, and Serbia had declared war on the Ottoman Empire in July 1876. At the start of 1877, the ship was assigned to the 2. Division of the Mediterranean Fleet, based in Crete, along with the ironclads Mukaddeme-i Hayir and Aziziye. The Russo-Turkish War began on 24 April 1877 with a Russian declaration of war, after which Iclaliye was transferred to the Black Sea Division, where she spent the war with the bulk of the Ottoman ironclad fleet. The Ottoman fleet, commanded by Hobart Pasha, was vastly superior to the Russian Black Sea Fleet; the only ironclads the Russians possessed there were Vitse-admiral Popov and Novgorod, circular vessels that had proved to be useless in service. The presence of the fleet did force the Russians to keep two corps in reserve for coastal defense, but the Ottoman high command failed to make use of its naval superiority in a more meaningful way, particularly to hinder the Russian advance into the Balkans. Hobart Pasha took the fleet to the eastern Black Sea, where he was able to make a more aggressive use of it to support the Ottoman forces battling the Russians in the Caucasus. The fleet bombarded Poti and assisted in the defense of Batumi.

On 14 May 1877, an Ottoman squadron consisting of Iclaliye and the ironclads Avnillah, Muin-i Zafer, Feth-i Bülend, Mukaddeme-i Hayir, and Necm-i Şevket bombarded Russian positions around the Black Sea port of Sokhumi before landing infantry and arming the local populace to start an uprising against the Russians. The Ottomans captured Sokhumi two days later. Over the course of the war, Russian torpedo boats made several attacks on the vessels stationed in the Black Sea, but Iclaliye was not damaged in any of them. These attacks included one launched on 10 June by six torpedo boats, by which point Iclaliye had been transferred to the port of Sulina at the mouth of the Danube, along with Feth-i Bülend and Mukaddeme-i Hayir. During this attack, the boat Chesma targeted Iclaliye, but defensive nets set up around the vessel prevented the torpedo from exploding against her hull. Iclaliye got underway, but was not fast enough to catch the Russian torpedo boats, though one of them was sunk by the explosion of its own torpedo. After the end of the war, Iclaliye was laid up in Constantinople in 1879.

=== Later career ===
The annual summer cruises to the Bosporus ended after the Russo-Turkish War. By the early-1880s, the Ottoman ironclad fleet was in poor condition, and Iclaliye was unable to go to sea. Many of the ships' engines were unusable, having seized up from rust, and their hulls were badly fouled. The British naval attache to the Ottoman Empire at the time estimated that the Imperial Arsenal would take six months to get just five of the ironclads ready to go to sea. Throughout this period, the ship's crew was limited to about one-third the normal figure. In 1883, Iclaliye was sent to Crete to guard the island. She remained there for three years before returning to the Golden Horn in January 1886.

The ship was refitted by the Imperial Arsenal in 1891. At the start of the Greco-Turkish War in February 1897, the Ottomans inspected the fleet and found that almost all of the vessels, including Iclaliye, to be completely unfit for combat against the Greek Navy, which possessed the three modern Hydra-class ironclads. The ships' guns and armor were long obsolete, and their crews were poorly trained. Through April and May, the Ottoman fleet made several sorties into the Aegean Sea in an attempt to raise morale among the ships' crews, though the Ottomans had no intention of attacking Greek forces. The condition of the Ottoman fleet could not be concealed from foreign observers, particularly the British Admiral Henry Woods and the German Admiral Eugen Kalau vom Hofe, who led the inspection. The fleet proved to be an embarrassment for the government and finally forced Sultan Abdul Hamid II to authorize a modernization program, which recommended that the ironclads be modernized in foreign shipyards. German firms, including Krupp, Schichau-Werke, and AG Vulcan, were to rebuild the ships, but after having surveyed the ships, withdrew from the project in December 1897 owing to the impracticality of modernizing the ships and the inability of the Ottoman government to pay for the work. By 1900, the contracts were finally awarded, but Iclaliye was not included in the program.

In 1904, the ship's barbette was removed and she was placed in the reserve fleet later that year. During the Italo-Turkish War, Iclaliye was stationed in the Golden Horn. On 30 October 1912, during the First Balkan War, Iclaliye was reactivated to stop the Bulgarian advance against the Ottoman defenders at Çatalca. She was joined by the ironclad Necm-i Şevket; both vessels had to be towed into place, and they remained in their firing positions for only a few days. The two ships, joined by the pre-dreadnought battleships Barbaros Hayreddin and Torgud Reis and the modernized ironclads Mesudiye and Asar-i Tevfik, were towed to Büyükçekmece, where they remained from 15 to 20 November, though they made little contact with Bulgarian forces. From February 1914, the ship served as an accommodation hulk for the Naval High School at Heybeliada. She became a stationary training ship for naval cadets in February 1919, based in Constantinople. She returned to barracks ship duties in 1923 and was stationed at the Gölcük Naval Shipyard. She was decommissioned in 1928 and broken up in Gölcük.
