= Ottoman ironclad Avnillah =

Ironclad warship of the Ottoman Navy

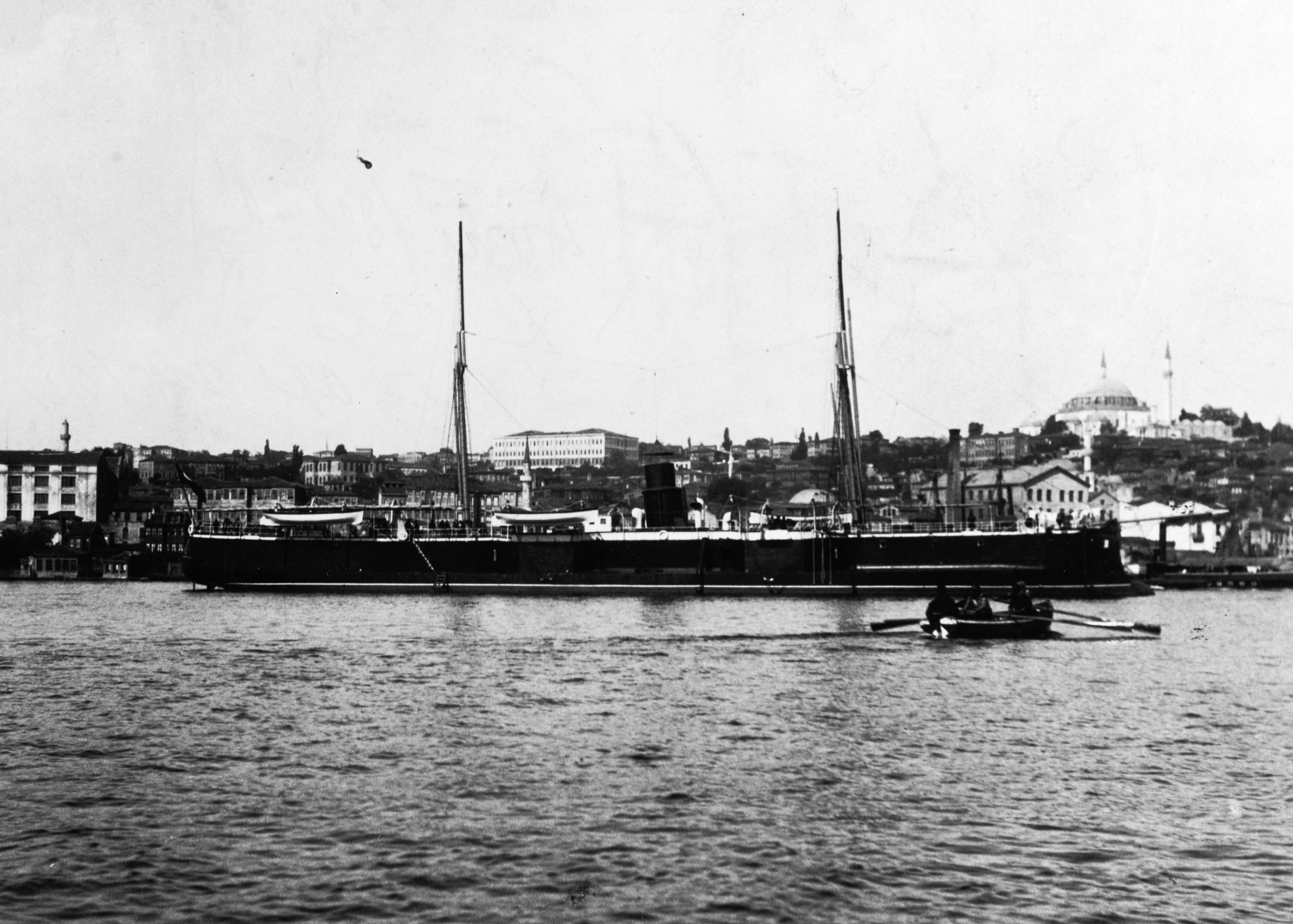
- Avnillah, c. 1885

History

Ottoman Empire
- Name: Avnillah
- Namesake: "Divine Assistance"
- Ordered: 1867
- Builder: Thames Iron Works
- Laid down: 1868
- Launched: 21 April 1869
- Commissioned: 1870
- Fate: Sunk, 24 February 1912

General characteristics
- Class & type: Avnillah-class ironclad
- Displacement: 2,362 metric tons (2,325 long tons)
- Length: 68.9 m (226 ft 1 in) (lpp)
- Beam: 10.9 m (35 ft 9 in)
- Draft: 5 m (16 ft 5 in)
- Installed power: 4 × box boilers; 2,200 indicated horsepower (1,600 kW)
- Propulsion: 1 × compound steam engine; 1 × screw propeller
- Speed: 12 knots (22 km/h; 14 mph)
- Complement: 15 officers; 130 enlisted men
- Armament: 4 × 228 mm (9 in) guns
- Armor: Belt: 130 to 150 mm (5 to 6 in); Casemate: 150 mm

Avnillah (Ottoman Turkish: Divine Assistance) was an ironclad warship built for the Ottoman Navy in the late 1860s. The lead ship of the Avnillah class, she was built by the Thames Iron Works in Britain. The ship was laid down in 1868, launched in 1869, and she was commissioned into the fleet the following year. A central battery ship, she was armed with a battery of four 228 mm (9 in) guns in a central casemate, and was capable of a top speed of 12 knots (22 km/h; 14 mph).

Avnillah saw action during the Russo-Turkish War in 1877–1878, where she supported Ottoman forces in the Caucasus. After the war, she was placed in reserve and allowed to deteriorate; by the outbreak of the Greco-Turkish War in 1897, she was in unserviceable condition. Avnillah was modernized in 1903–1906 during a major reconstruction program begun after the war. She became a harbor defense ship stationed in Beirut. She was sunk by the Italian armored cruiser Giuseppe Garibaldi in the Battle of Beirut during the Italo-Turkish War in February 1912.

== Design ==
Line-drawing of Avnillah

Avnillah was 68.9 m (226 ft 1 in) long between perpendiculars, with a beam of 10.9 m (35 ft 9 in) and a draft of 5 m (16 ft 5 in). The hull was constructed with iron, incorporated a partial double bottom, and displaced 2,362 metric tons (2,325 long tons) normally and 1,399 t (1,377 long tons) BOM. She had a crew of 15 officers and 130 enlisted men.

The ship was powered by a single horizontal compound steam engine which drove one screw propeller. Steam was provided by four coal-fired box boilers that were trunked into a single funnel amidships. The engine was rated at 2,200 indicated horsepower (1,600 kW) and produced a top speed of 12 knots (22 km/h; 14 mph), though by 1877 she was only capable of 10 kn (19 km/h; 12 mph). Decades of poor maintenance had reduced the ship's speed to 8 kn (15 km/h; 9.2 mph) by 1892. Avnillah carried 220 t (220 long tons; 240 short tons) of coal. A supplementary brigantine rig was also fitted.

The ship was armed with a battery of four 228 mm (9 in) muzzle loading guns mounted in a central, armored casemate, two guns per side. The guns were positioned so as to allow any two to fire directly ahead, astern, or to either broadside. The ship's armored belt was 130 to 150 mm (5 to 6 in) thick, with the thicker portion above the waterline and the thinner below. The belt was capped with 76 mm (3 in) thick transverse bulkheads at either end. The casemate had heavy armor protection, with the gun battery protected by 150 mm of iron plating.

== Service history ==
Avnillah was ordered in 1867 and was laid down at the Thames Iron Works in Blackwall, London the following year. She was launched on 21 April 1869; fitting-out work was completed by 1870, when she conducted sea trials before being commissioned later that year. Upon completion, Avnillah and the other ironclads then being built in Britain and France were sent to Crete to assist in the aftermath of the Cretan Revolt of 1866–1869. During this period, the Ottoman fleet, under Hobart Pasha, remained largely inactive, with training confined to reading translated British instruction manuals. Avnillah was assigned to the II Squadron of the Asiatic Fleet, along with her sister ship Muin-i Zafer and the ironclads Hifz-ur Rahman and Lütf-ü Celil. Early in the ship's career, the Ottoman ironclad fleet was activated every summer for short cruises from the Golden Horn to the Bosporus to ensure their propulsion systems were in operable condition.

=== Russo-Turkish War ===
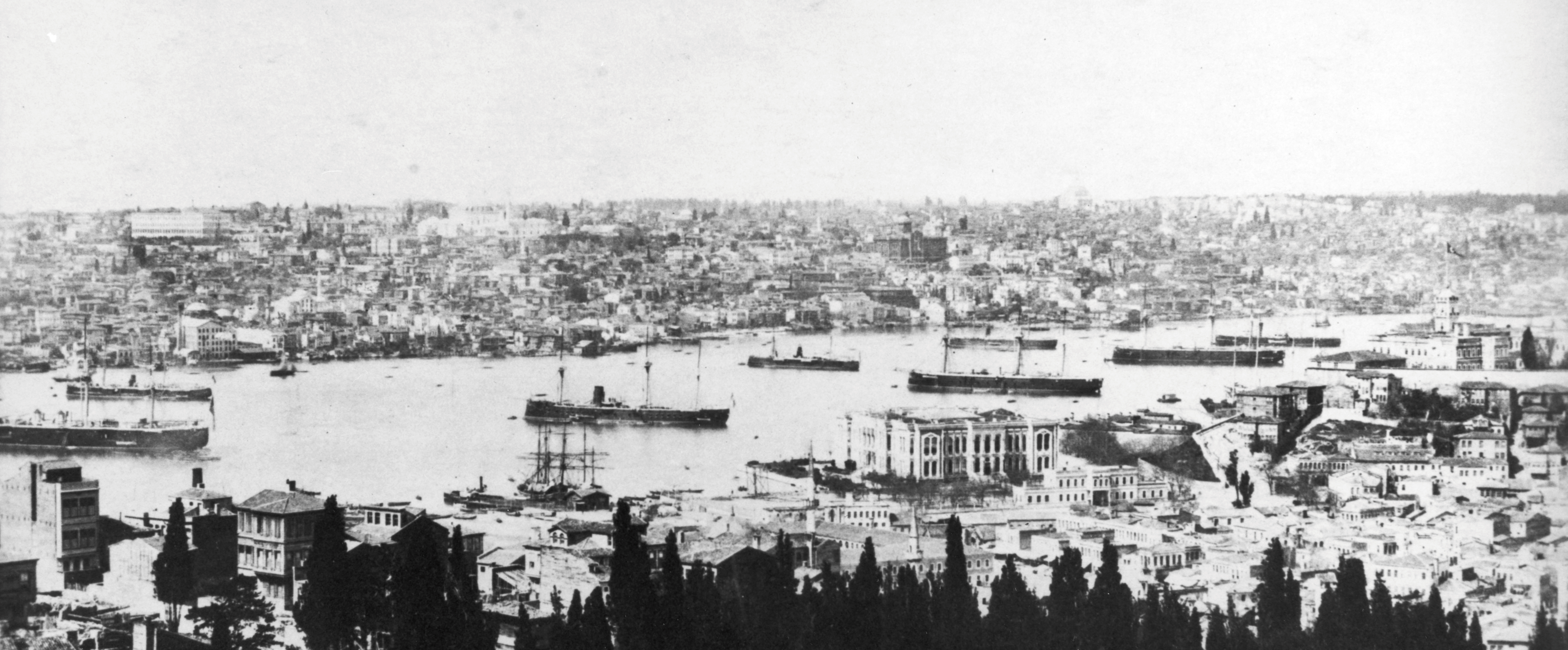
The Ottoman ironclad fleet in the Golden Horn; Avnillah is among the vessels present

The Ottoman fleet began mobilizing in September 1876 to begin preparations for a conflict with Russia, as tensions with the country had been growing for several years, an insurrection had begun in Ottoman Bosnia in mid-1875, and Serbia had declared war on the Ottoman Empire in July 1876. In December 1876, Avnillah and her sister ship Muin-i Zafer were transferred to Batumi owing to the increasingly active Russian naval forces in the area. The Russo-Turkish War began on 24 April 1877 with a Russian declaration of war. Avnillah spent the war in the Black Sea squadron, with the bulk of the Ottoman ironclad fleet. The eight ironclads of the Ottoman fleet in the Black Sea, commanded by Hobart, were vastly superior to the Russian Black Sea Fleet; the only ironclads the Russians possessed there were Vitse-admiral Popov and Novgorod, circular vessels that had proved to be useless in service, owing to their very low speed and the difficulty in controlling them.

The presence of the fleet did force the Russians to keep two corps in reserve for coastal defense, but the Ottoman high command failed to make use of its naval superiority in a more meaningful way, particularly to hinder the Russian advance into the Balkans. Hobart Pasha took the fleet to the eastern Black Sea, where he was able to make a more aggressive use of it to support the Ottoman forces battling the Russians in the Caucasus. The fleet bombarded Poti and assisted in the defense of Batumi. On 14 May 1877, an Ottoman squadron consisting of Avnillah, Muin-i Zafer, Necm-i Şevket, Feth-i Bülend, Mukaddeme-i Hayir, and Iclaliye bombarded Russian positions around the Black Sea port of Sokhumi before landing infantry and arming the local populace to start an uprising against the Russians. The Ottomans captured Sokhumi two days later. Over the course of the war, Russian torpedo boats made several attacks on the vessels stationed in Batumi, but Avnillah was not damaged in any of them. The fleet continued to support the Ottoman garrison at Batumi, when held out against constant Russian attacks to the end of the war.

=== Later career ===
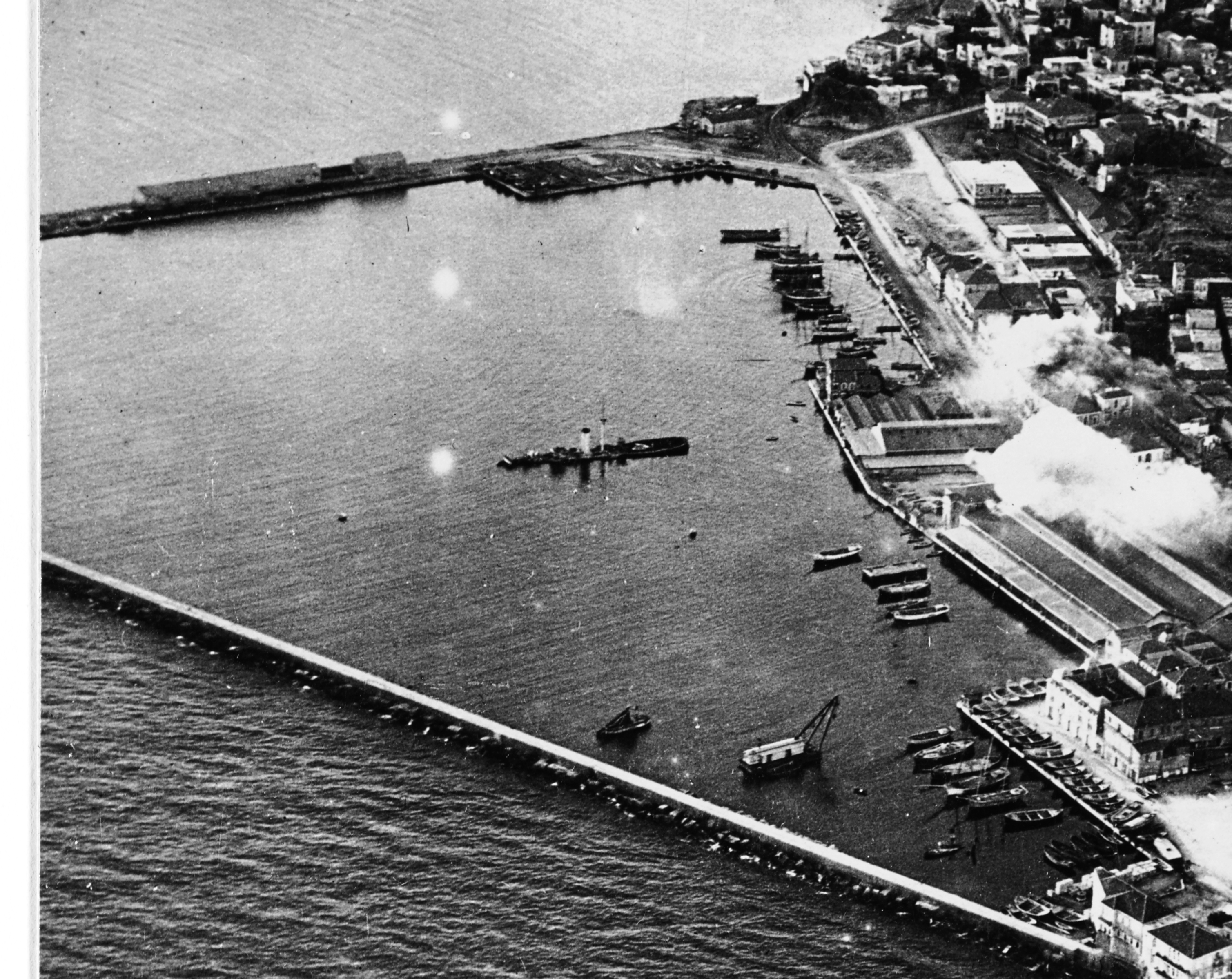
Avnillah sunk in Beirut harbor, seen from the air during World War I

The ship was laid up in Constantinople in 1878; she did not see further activity for the next twenty years. The annual summer cruises to the Bosporus ended. During this period, the ship underwent a slight modernization. In 1882, a pair of 87 mm (3.4 in) breech-loading guns manufactured by Krupp were added. At some point, she also received new Scotch marine boilers, and her brigantine rig was removed, with heavy military masts installed in its place. The Ottomans planned to further strengthen the ship's armament with a pair of 63 mm (2.5 in) Krupp guns, two 37 mm (1.5 in) Hotchkiss revolver cannon, two 25.4 mm (1 in) guns, also manufactured by Hotchkiss, and a 450 mm (18 in) torpedo tube, but the plan came to nothing.

By the mid-1880s, the Ottoman ironclad fleet was in poor condition, and Avnillah was unable to go to sea. Many of the ships' engines were unusable, having seized up from rust, and their hulls were badly fouled. The British naval attache to the Ottoman Empire at the time estimated that the Imperial Arsenal would take six months to get just five of the ironclads ready to go to sea. Throughout this period, the ship's crew was limited to about one-third the normal figure. During a period of tension with Greece in 1886, the fleet was brought to full crews and the ships were prepared to go to sea, but none actually left the Golden Horn, and they were quickly laid up again. By that time, most of the ships were capable of little more than 4 to 6 knots (7.4 to 11.1 km/h; 4.6 to 6.9 mph).

At the start of the Greco-Turkish War in February 1897, the Ottomans inspected the fleet and found that almost all of the vessels, including Avnillah, to be completely unfit for combat against the Greek Navy, which possessed the three modern Hydra-class ironclads. The ships' guns and armor were long obsolete, and their crews were poorly trained. Through April and May, the Ottoman fleet made several sorties into the Aegean Sea in an attempt to raise morale among the ships' crews, though the Ottomans had no intention of attacking Greek forces. The condition of the Ottoman fleet could not be concealed from foreign observers, particularly the British Admiral Henry Wood and the German Admiral Eugen Kalau vom Hofe, who led the inspection. The fleet proved to be an embarrassment for the government and finally forced Sultan Abdul Hamid II to authorize a modernization program, which recommended that the ironclads be modernized in foreign shipyards. German firms, including Krupp, Schichau-Werke, and AG Vulcan, were to rebuild the ships, but after having surveyed the ships, withdrew from the project in December 1897 owing to the impracticality of modernizing the ships and the inability of the Ottoman government to pay for the work. By 1900, the contracts were finally awarded, but Avnillah was not included in the program. After further negotiations, Gio. Ansaldo & C. received the contract to rebuild the ship in 1903, with work lasting until 1906. Her old muzzle-loading guns were replaced with new 150 mm (5.9 in) Krupp 40-caliber guns, and a new light battery consisting of six 75 mm (3 in) quick-firing (QF) Krupp guns, ten 57 mm (2.2 in) QF Krupp guns, and two 47 mm (1.9 in) QF Krupp guns.

Long since obsolete, Avnillah was reduced to a stationary ship based in Beirut in 1910, where she was tasked with providing local defense. By this time, she was armed with only four 57 mm (2.2 in) quick-firing guns. In September 1911, Italy declared war on the Ottoman Empire, initiating the Italo-Turkish War. The Italian command was concerned that Avnillah or the torpedo boat Ankara, which was also in the harbor, would attack Italian troop transports passing through the Suez Canal, and therefore decided to neutralize the vessels. On the morning of 24 February 1912, two Italian armored cruisers, Giuseppe Garibaldi and Francesco Ferruccio arrived off the port and demanded that the two ships be surrendered. At 09:00, having heard no reply from the Ottoman Vali (Governor), the Italian vessels opened fire at a range of 6,000 meters (6,600 yd). In the ensuing Battle of Beirut, the Italians hit Avnillah and set her on fire; she returned fire against the Italian cruisers but scored no hits. The cruisers then entered the harbor, where Giuseppe Garibaldi fired two torpedoes at Avnillah, the first of which missed and sank six civilian vessels. The second struck her amidships and sank her in the shallow water. Casualty estimates range from two officers and forty-nine enlisted men killed to three officers and fifty-five men killed in the sinking. A further eight officers and a hundred men were injured.
