= Ottoman ironclad Necm-i Şevket =

Ironclad warship of the Ottoman Navy

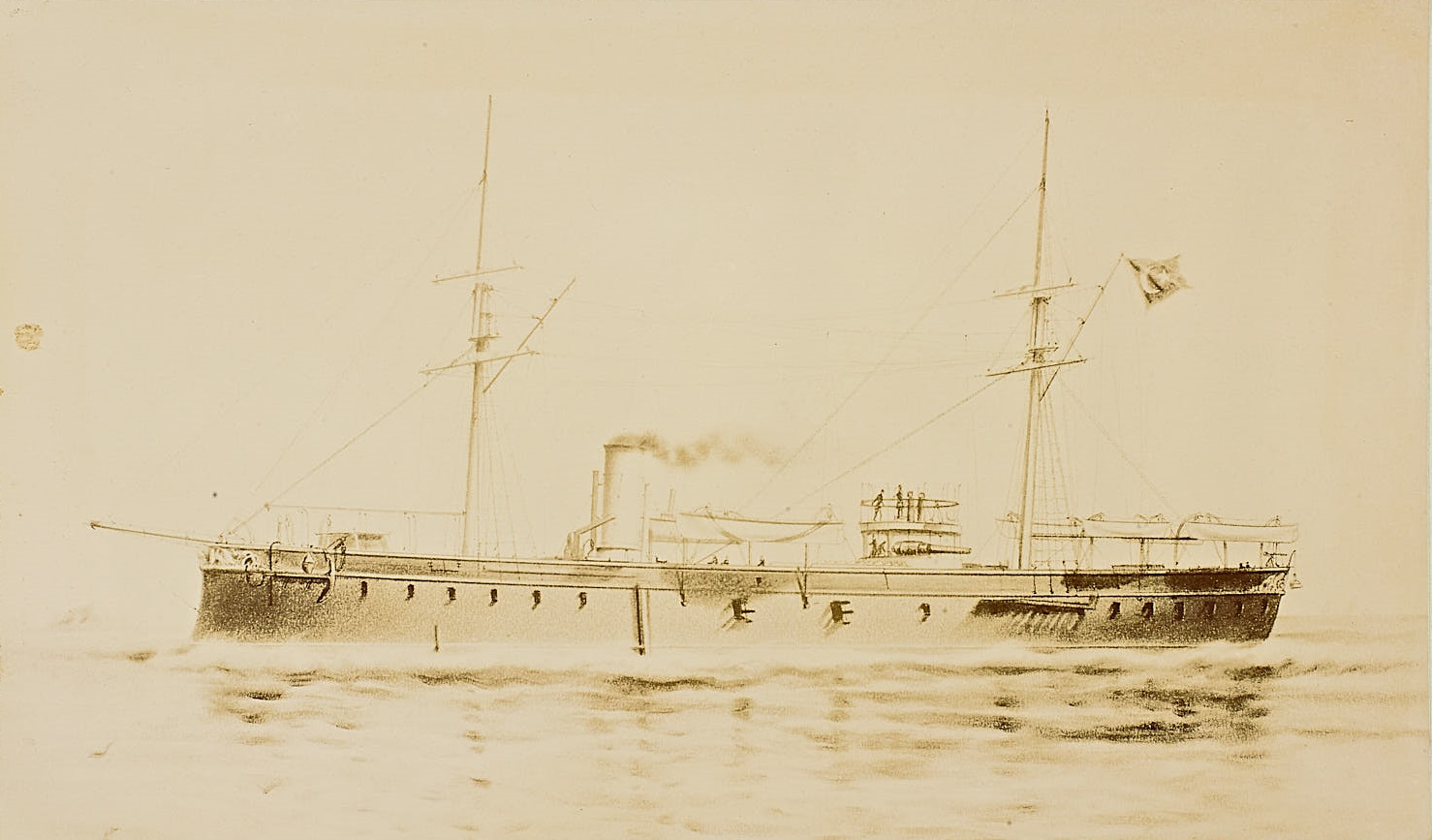
- Necm-i Şevket underway

History

Ottoman Empire
- Name: Necm-i Şevket
- Namesake: "Star of Majesty"
- Ordered: 1866
- Builder: Forges et Chantiers de la Gironde
- Laid down: 1867
- Launched: 1868
- Commissioned: 3 March 1870
- Decommissioned: 1929
- Fate: Broken up, 1929

General characteristics
- Class & type: Asar-i Şevket-class ironclad
- Displacement: 2,047 metric tons (2,015 long tons; 2,256 short tons)
- Length: 66.4 m (217 ft 10 in) (loa)
- Beam: 12.9 m (42 ft 4 in)
- Draft: 5 m (16 ft 5 in)
- Installed power: 4 × box boilers; 1,750 ihp (1,300 kW)
- Propulsion: 1 × compound steam engine; 1 × screw propeller
- Speed: 12 knots (22 km/h; 14 mph)
- Complement: 170
- Armament: 1 × 229 mm (9 in) Armstrong gun; 4 × 178 mm (7 in) Armstrong guns
- Armor: Belt: 152 mm (6 in); Battery: 114 mm (4.5 in); Barbette: 114 mm

Necm-i Şevket (Ottoman Turkish: Star of Majesty) was a central battery ship, the second of two Asar-i Şevket-class ships, that was built for the Ottoman Navy in the 1860s. Originally ordered by the Khedivate of Egypt but confiscated by the Ottoman Empire while under construction, the vessel was initially named Muzaffer. The ship was laid down at the French Forges et Chantiers de la Gironde shipyard in 1867, was launched in 1868, and was commissioned into the Ottoman fleet in March 1870. Asar-i Şevket was armed with a battery of four 178 mm (7 in) Armstrong guns in a central casemate and one 229 mm (9 in) Armstrong gun in a revolving barbette.

The ship saw action in the Russo-Turkish War in 1877–1878, where she supported Ottoman forces in the Caucasus, and later helped to defend the port of Sulina on the Danube. She was laid up for twenty years, until the outbreak of the Greco-Turkish War in 1897, which highlighted the badly deteriorated state of the Ottoman fleet. Necm-i Şevket was one of just two ironclads that was still in serviceable condition at the time of the war, though she was not included in the large fleet modernization program. Instead, she became a stationary ship and later a barracks ship. During the First Balkan War in 1912, Necm-i Şevket was reactivated to help stop the Bulgarian advance on Constantinople. Thoroughly obsolete by that point, she saw little action and returned to barracks duties after the war. The ship remained in the fleet's inventory through the 1920s, being decommissioned in 1929 and broken up thereafter.

== Design ==
Plan and profile drawing of the Asar-i Şevket class

Necm-i Şevket was 66.4 m (217 ft 10 in) long overall, with a beam of 12.9 m (42 ft 4 in) and a draft of 5 m (16 ft 5 in). The hull was constructed with iron, incorporated a ram bow and a partial double bottom. She displaced 2,047 metric tons (2,015 long tons; 2,256 short tons) normally. She had a crew of 170 officers and enlisted men.

The ship was powered by a single horizontal compound steam engine which drove a single screw propeller. Steam was provided by four coal-fired box boilers that were trunked into a single funnel amidships. The engine was rated at 1,750 indicated horsepower (1,300 kW) and produced a top speed of 12 knots (22 km/h; 14 mph), though by 1877 she was only capable of 8 kn (15 km/h; 9.2 mph). Necm-i Şevket carried 300 t (300 long tons; 330 short tons) of coal. A supplementary brig rig was also fitted.

Necm-i Şevket was armed with a battery of one muzzle loading 229 mm (9 in) Armstrong gun and four 178 mm (7 in) Armstrong guns. The 178 mm guns were mounted in a central, armored battery, with the 229 mm gun on top in an open barbette mount. The ship's armored belt consisted of wrought iron that was 152 mm (6 in) thick and was reduced to 114 mm (4.5 in) toward the bow and stern. Above the main belt, a strake of armor 114 mm thick protected the central battery, and the same thickness was used for the barbette.

== Service history ==
Necm-i Şevket, meaning "Star of Majesty", was originally ordered by the Khedivate of Egypt in 1866 from the French Forges et Chantiers de la Gironde shipyard in Lormont under the name Muzaffer. Her keel was laid down in 1867, and she was launched the following year. On 29 August 1868, the Ottoman Empire forced Egypt to surrender the ship, which was then renamed Necm-i Şevket and commissioned into the Ottoman Navy on 3 March 1870. Upon completion, Necm-i Şevket and the other ironclads then being built in Britain and France were sent to Crete to assist in stabilizing the island in the aftermath of the Cretan Revolt of 1866–1869. During this period, the Ottoman fleet, under Hobart Pasha, remained largely inactive, with training confined to reading translated British instruction manuals. Necm-i Şevket was assigned to the I Squadron of the Asiatic Fleet, along with her sister ship Asar-i Şevket and the ironclads Hifz-ur Rahman and Lütf-ü Celil. Early in the ship's career, the Ottoman ironclad fleet was activated every summer for short cruises from the Golden Horn to the Bosporus to ensure their propulsion systems were in operable condition.

=== Russo-Turkish War ===
The Ottoman fleet began mobilizing in September 1876 to prepare for a conflict with Russia, as tensions with the country had been growing for several years, an insurrection had begun in Ottoman Bosnia in mid-1875, and Serbia had declared war on the Ottoman Empire in July 1876. The Russo-Turkish War began on 24 April 1877 with a Russian declaration of war. Necm-i Şevket spent the war in the Black Sea squadron, with the bulk of the Ottoman ironclad fleet. The Ottoman fleet, commanded by Hobart Pasha, was vastly superior to the Russian Black Sea Fleet; the only ironclads the Russians possessed there were Vitse-admiral Popov and Novgorod, circular vessels that had proved to be useless in service. The presence of the fleet did force the Russians to keep two corps in reserve for coastal defense, but the Ottoman high command failed to make use of its naval superiority in a more meaningful way, particularly to hinder the Russian advance into the Balkans. Hobart Pasha took the fleet to the eastern Black Sea, where he was able to make a more aggressive use of it to support the Ottoman forces battling the Russians in the Caucasus. The fleet bombarded Poti and assisted in the defense of Batumi.

On 14 May 1877, an Ottoman squadron consisting of Necm-i Şevket and the ironclads Avnillah, Muin-i Zafer, Feth-i Bülend, Mukaddeme-i Hayir, and Iclaliye bombarded Russian positions around the Black Sea port of Sokhumi before landing infantry and arming the local populace to start an uprising against the Russians. The Ottomans captured Sokhumi two days later. Over the course of the war, Russian torpedo boats made several attacks on the vessels stationed in Batumi, but Necm-i Şevket was not damaged in any of them. The Ottoman fleet continued to support the Ottoman garrison at Batumi, when held out against constant Russian attacks to the end of the war.

=== Later career ===
On 7 March 1878, Necm-i Şevket ran into the British steamship John Middleton at Tophane. John Middleton was driven into HMS Antelope and then sank. HMS Antelope, which was severely damaged herself, rescued the crew of John Middleton. After the end of the war in 1878, Necm-i Şevket was laid up in Constantinople. This was in part due to chronically low budgets, and in part due to the fact that the Sultan, Abdul Hamid II, who had come to power after a coup deposed Murad V that involved senior members of the Navy, distrusted the Navy. The annual summer cruises to the Bosporus ended. By the mid-1880s, the Ottoman ironclad fleet was in poor condition, and Necm-i Şevket was unable to go to sea. Many of the ships' engines were unusable, having seized up from rust, and their hulls were badly fouled. The British naval attaché to the Ottoman Empire at the time estimated that the Imperial Arsenal would take six months to get just five of the ironclads ready to go to sea. Throughout this period, the ship's crew was limited to about one-third the normal figure. During a period of tension with Greece in 1886, the fleet was brought to full crews and the ships were prepared to go to sea, but none actually left the Golden Horn, and they were quickly laid up again. By that time, most of the ships were capable of little more than 4 to 6 knots (7.4 to 11.1 km/h; 4.6 to 6.9 mph). In 1890, the ship was taken to the Imperial Arsenal for refitting, and new boilers were installed. The ship also received a battery of light guns, including two 87 mm (3.4 in) Krupp guns, two 63.5 mm (2.50 in) Krupp guns, two 37 mm (1.5 in) Hotchkiss revolver cannon, and one 25.4 mm (1 in) Nordenfelt gun. The ship returned to service on 12 February 1892.

At the start of the Greco-Turkish War in February 1897, Necm-i Şevket was assigned to the II Squadron. The Ottomans inspected the fleet and found that almost all of the vessels, including Necm-i Şevket, to be completely unfit for combat against the Greek Navy. Many of the ships had rotted hulls and their crews were poorly trained. Necm-i Şevket was one of two ironclads found to be in usable condition, the other being Mesudiye. In April and May, the ship escorted troopships transporting infantry from western Anatolia to Gelibolu, and while conducting these operations, she took part in gunnery exercises. On 15 May, Necm-i Şevket and the ironclads Mesudiye, Osmaniye, Aziziye, and Hamidiye, along with several other vessels conducted a major training exercise, where severe deficiencies in the level of training were revealed, particularly with the men's ability to operate the ships' guns. In September 1897, the war came to an end, and the Ottoman fleet returned to Constantinople.

The condition of the Ottoman fleet could not be concealed from foreign observers, which proved to be an embarrassment for the government and finally forced Abdul Hamid II to authorize a modernization program, which recommended that the ironclads be modernized in foreign shipyards. German firms, including Krupp, Schichau-Werke, and AG Vulcan, were to rebuild the ships, but after having surveyed the ships, withdrew from the project in December 1897 owing to the impracticality of modernizing the ships and the inability of the Ottoman government to pay for the work. By 1900, the contracts were finally awarded, and Necm-i Şevket was not included in the program. Instead, the ship was employed as a stationary ship based in Selanik from 1899 to 1909, at which point she was converted into a barracks ship in Constantinople.

On 30 October 1912, during the First Balkan War, Necm-i Şevket was reactivated to stop the Bulgarian advance against the Ottoman defenders at Çatalca. She was joined by the ironclad Iclaliye; both vessels had to be towed into place, and they remained in their firing positions for only a few days. The two ships, joined by the pre-dreadnought battleships Barbaros Hayreddin and Turgut Reis and the modernized Mesudiye and Asar-i Tevfik, were towed to Büyükçekmece, where they remained from 15 to 20 November, though they made little contact with Bulgarian forces. The ship resumed her barracks ship duties after the war and was decommissioned in 1929 and was thereafter broken up.
