= Avnillah-class ironclad =

Ironclad warship class of the Ottoman Navy

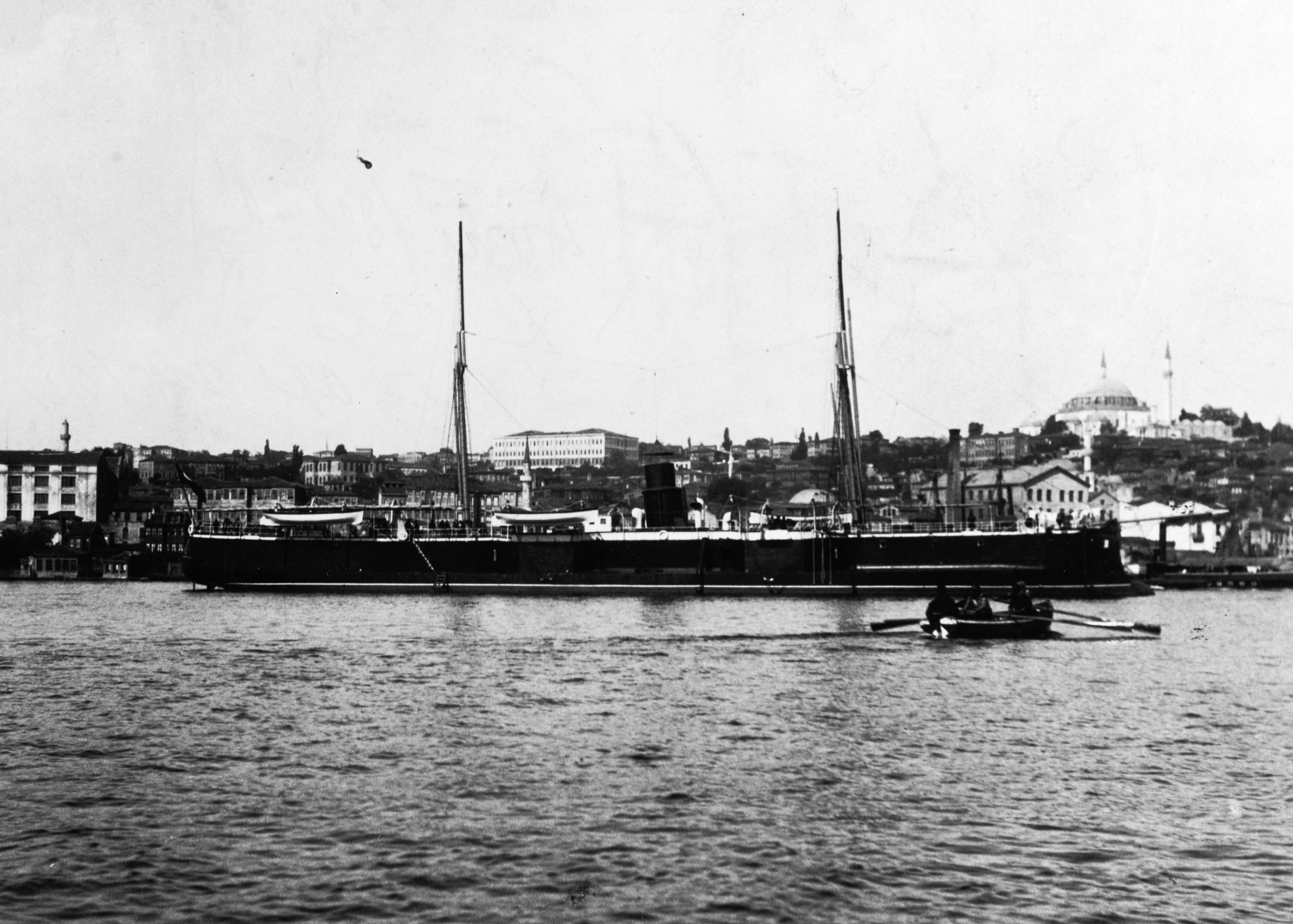
- Avnillah, c. 1885

Class overview
- Operators: Ottoman Empire
- Preceded by: Lütf-ü Celil-class ironclad
- Succeeded by: Feth-i Bülend-class ironclad
- Built: 1868–1870
- In commission: 1870–1932
- Completed: 2
- Lost: 1
- Scrapped: 1

General characteristics
- Type: Central battery ship
- Displacement: 2,362 metric tons (2,325 long tons)
- Length: 68.9 m (226 ft 1 in) (lpp)
- Beam: 10.9 m (35 ft 9 in)
- Draft: 5 m (16 ft 5 in)
- Installed power: 4 × box boilers; 2,200 indicated horsepower (1,600 kW)
- Propulsion: 1 × compound steam engine; 1 × screw propeller
- Speed: 12 knots (22 km/h; 14 mph)
- Complement: 15 officers; 130 enlisted men
- Armament: 4 × 228 mm (9 in) guns
- Armor: Belt: 130 to 150 mm (5 to 6 in); Casemate: 150 mm

The Avnillah class was a group of two ironclad warships built for the Ottoman Navy in the 1860s. The class comprised two vessels, Avnillah and Muin-i Zafer. The two ships were built in Britain between 1868 and 1870. They were armed with a battery of four 228 mm (9 in) guns mounted in a central casemate, making them central battery ships.

Both ships served during the Russo-Turkish War of 1877–1878, where they operated against Russian forces in the Black Sea. They were primarily tasked with supporting Ottoman forces ashore, though Muin-i Zafer also helped to defend the port of Sulina. After the war, both vessels were placed in reserve, and saw no further activity until 1897, when they were mobilized at the start of the Greco-Turkish War. Like the rest of the Ottoman fleet, both ships were in poor condition and were unable to be used offensively.

After the war ended, both vessels were rebuilt as part of a large reconstruction program aimed at modernizing the ancient Ottoman fleet. They returned to service with a new battery of four 150 mm (5.9 in) Krupp quick-firing guns as guard ships, and in this capacity Avnillah was sunk in the Battle of Beirut during the Italo-Turkish War in January 1912. Muin-i Zafer served on as a training ship from 1913, a barracks ship from 1920, and a depot ship for submarines from 1928. She was finally broken up for scrap in 1932.

== Design ==
In 1861, Abdülaziz became sultan of the Ottoman Empire, and thereafter began a construction program to strengthen the Ottoman Navy, which had incurred heavy losses during the Crimean War of 1853–1856. The Navy ordered several ironclad warships from shipyards in Britain and France, though the program was limited by the Ottoman Empire's restricted finances.

=== Characteristics ===
Line-drawing of Avnillah

Avnillah and Muin-i Zafer were 68.9 m (226 ft 1 in) long between perpendiculars, and they had a beam of 10.9 m (35 ft 9 in) and a draft of 5 m (16 ft 5 in). The hulls were constructed with iron, incorporated a partial double bottom, and included a ram bow. The ships displaced 2,362 metric tons (2,325 long tons) normally and 1,399 t (1,377 long tons) BOM. They had a crew of 15 officers and 130 enlisted men as built.

The ships of the Avnillah class were powered by a single horizontal compound steam engine which drove one screw propeller. Steam was provided by four coal-fired box boilers that were trunked into a single funnel amidships. The engine was rated at 2,200 indicated horsepower (1,600 kW) and produced a top speed of 12 knots (22 km/h; 14 mph), though by 1877 both vessels were only capable of 10 kn (19 km/h; 12 mph). Decades of poor maintenance had reduced the ships' speed to 8 kn (15 km/h; 9.2 mph) by 1892. The ships carried 220 t (220 long tons; 240 short tons) of coal. A supplementary brigantine rig with two masts was also fitted.

The ships were armed with a battery of four 228 mm (9 in) muzzle-loading guns that weighed 12.5 t (12.3 long tons; 13.8 short tons) apiece, mounted in a central, armored casemate, two guns per side. The guns were positioned so as to allow any two to fire directly ahead, astern, or to either broadside. Both vessels were protected with wrought iron armor plate. The ships' armored belt was 130 to 150 mm (5 to 6 in) thick, with the thicker portion above the waterline and the thinner below. It extended 0.91 m (3 ft) above the waterline and 1.14 m (3 ft 9 in) below. The belt was capped with 76 mm (3 in) thick transverse bulkheads at either end. The casemate had heavy armor protection, with the gun battery protected by 150 mm of iron plating.

=== Modifications ===
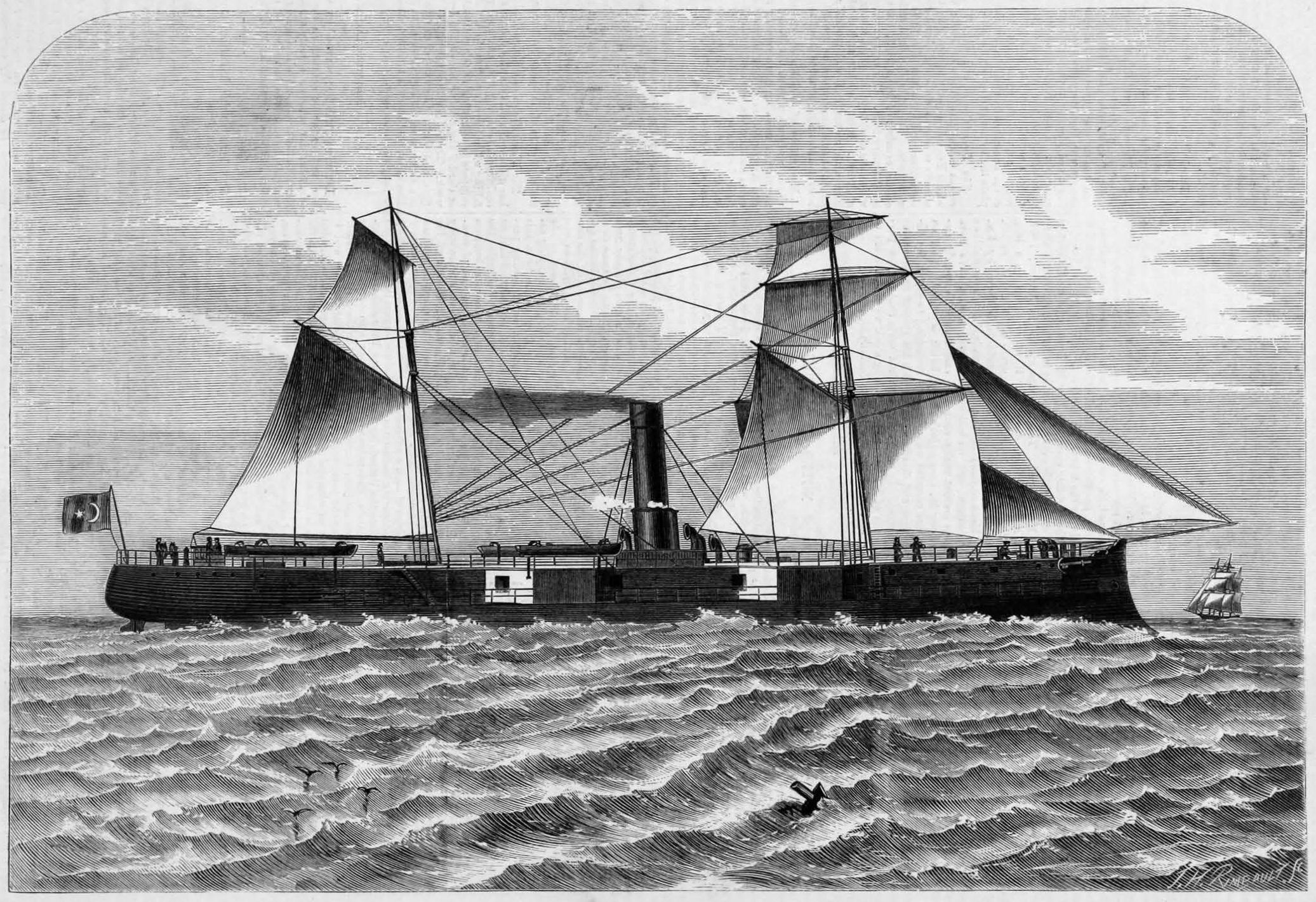
Illustration of Avnillah as originally configured

Both ships received a pair of 87 mm (3.4 in) breech-loading guns manufactured by Krupp in 1882. At some point, they both also received new Scotch marine boilers, and their brigantine rig was removed, with heavy military masts installed in its place. The Ottomans planned to further strengthen the ships' armament with a pair of 63 mm (2.5 in) Krupp guns, two 37 mm (1.5 in) Hotchkiss revolver cannon, two 25.4 mm (1 in) guns, also manufactured by Hotchkiss, and a 450 mm (18 in) torpedo tube, but the plan came to nothing.

In 1903–1906, both ships were heavily modernized, which included the installation of a conning tower, along with a complete replacement of their armament. Their old muzzle-loading guns were replaced with new 150 mm (5.9 in) Krupp 40-caliber guns, and a new light battery consisting of six 75 mm (3 in) quick-firing (QF) Krupp guns, ten 57 mm (2.2 in) QF Krupp guns, and two 47 mm (1.9 in) QF Krupp guns. During their reconstruction, both vessels had their box boilers replaced with Scotch marine boilers, though they retained the original engine. Their sailing masts were removed and were replaced with heavy fighting masts. The ships' crew increased to 220 officers and enlisted.

== Ships ==
Ship	Builder	Laid down	Launched	Completed
Avnillah	Thames Iron Works, London	1868	21 April 1869	1870
Muin-i Zafer	Samuda Brothers, London	1868	June 1869	1870

== Service history ==
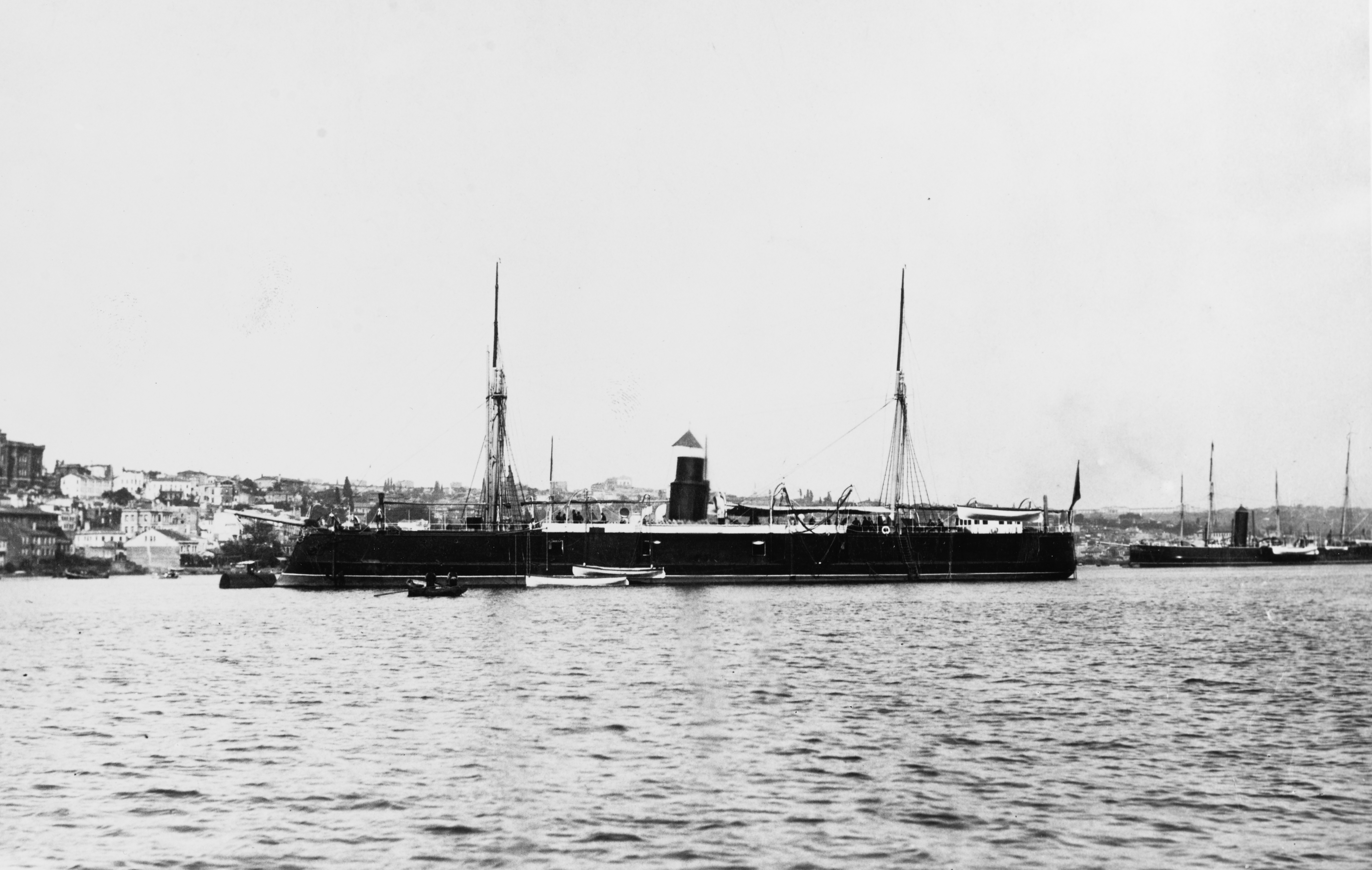
Muin-i Zafer in Constantinople, sometime before 1894

Both ships of the class were stationed in Crete after they entered service, to assist in stabilizing the island in the aftermath of the Cretan Revolt of 1866–1869. Nevertheless, the Ottoman fleet remained largely inactive during this period. Both ships saw action during the Russo-Turkish War of 1877–1878, where they operated against Russian forces in the Black Sea. They were primarily occupied with bombarding Russian coastal positions in support of the Ottoman army in the Caucasus. They also supported an amphibious assault on the port of Sokhumi in May 1877. For the rest of the war, Muin-i Zafer was stationed in Sulina at the mouth of the Danube, while Avnillah assisted in the defense of Batumi in the Caucasus. After the war, both vessels were laid up in Constantinople, and they received a minor refit in 1882.

At the start of the Greco-Turkish War in February 1897, the Ottomans inspected the fleet and found that almost all of the vessels, including both Avnillah-class ships, to be completely unfit for combat against the Greek Navy. Following the end of the war with Greece, the government decided to begin a naval reconstruction program. The two ships were rebuilt by Gio. Ansaldo & C. between 1903 and 1906 at the Ottoman Imperial Arsenal, which was in part leased to Ansaldo. After returning to service, both ships were reduced to guard ships in 1910. At the outbreak of the Italo-Turkish War in September 1911, Avnillah was stationed in Beirut, where on 24 February 1912, two Italian armored cruisers—Giuseppe Garibaldi and Francesco Ferruccio—attacked the port in the Battle of Beirut. During the action, the Italians hit Avnillah with multiple shells and then torpedoed her, sinking her in the harbor. Muin-i Zafer was meanwhile disarmed at Port Said so her guns could be used to strengthen the defenses of the city. In 1913, she became a torpedo training ship, and in 1920 she was converted into a barracks ship, before becoming a depot ship for submarines in 1928. Decommissioned in 1932, she was broken up thereafter.
