= Herbert F. Hore =

Herbert Francis Hore (14 March 1817 – 15 August 1865) was an Irish historian, archaeologist, and author, born in County Wexford. The Hore family were relatively large landowners and first arrived in County Wexford in the early stages of the Anglo-Norman invasion of Ireland and thereafter played a prominent role in the history of the county.

During his life he was also a J.P. (Justice of the peace) for County Wexford, Secretary of the Fishery Commission of Ireland, and a Member of the Royal Society of Antiquaries of Ireland.

His son Philip published an important history of County Wexford.

== Early life ==
Herbert F. Hore was born at Clonattin, Gorey, County Wexford on 14 March 1817.

His father was Herbert William Hore (November 1783 – 11 January 1823) of Pole Hore, near Killurin, County Wexford. He was captain of H.M.S. Freija. His mother was Eliza Curling of West Hatch, Essex. They were married on 31 December 1814 at St. James's Church, Westminster. There were four children by this marriage, including Herbert Francis, Edward George (born 17 September 1823), Mary (born Clonattin, died young), and Eliza-Sara. Edward George Hore was a midshipman in the Royal Navy.

His mother remarried after Herbert's father died. In 1826 she married Henry Bedford. There were two children from this marriage: Henry Charles Grosvenor Bedford (born 26 January 1827) and Mary Frances Bedford.

== Marriage ==
Herbert F. Hore married Dorothea Lucretia Light, eldest daughter of Alexander Whalley Light, 25 January 1840 (once Colonel of the 25th Regiment of Foot — present at Waterloo) of Lytes Carey, Somerset. She was a widow at the time. Her first husband was Thomas Bilcliffe Fyler of Teddington (died 4 March 1838), Middlesex, an M.P. for Coventry (1826–31).

Herbert and Dorothea Lucretia had six children - Philip Herbert (14 November 1841 – 1931), Herbert William (15 December 1842 – died in the West Indies in 1859), Edith Catherine (born at Wimbleton), and three others. Herbert William Hore was a midshipman of H.M.S. Icarus.

For a time the family lived in France, then returned to County Wexford, and later moved to Dublin.

== Death ==
Herbert F. Hore died by suicide at Kildare Street, Dublin on 15 August 1865. He was buried at Glasnevin Cemetery, Dublin on 18 August 1865.

== Works ==
Much of his historical and archaeological work appears in the Journal of the Royal Society of Antiquaries of Ireland and its antecedents. He also contributed to a number of other Journals and publications.

He also wrote a book titled "An Inquiry Into the Legislation, Control, and Improvement of the Salmon and Sea Fisheries of Ireland", published in 1850.

Herbert F. Hore collected a lot of materials relating to the history of Ireland, and the history of County Wexford in particular. His son Philip H. Hore later published much of Herbert F. Hore's work and these materials between 1900 and 1911 in the six-volume History of the town and county of Wexford.

== Sources ==
- John Burke and John Bernard Burke, "A Genealogical and Heraldic Dictionary of the Landed Gentry of Great Britain and Ireland", Vol. 1, A - L (London: Henry Colburn, 1847).
- Frederick Arthur Crisp, "Visitation of Ireland".
- "The Gentleman's Magazine" - July to December, 1838 (London, 1838).
