= Ottoman ironclad Mukaddeme-i Hayir =

Ironclad warship of the Ottoman Navy

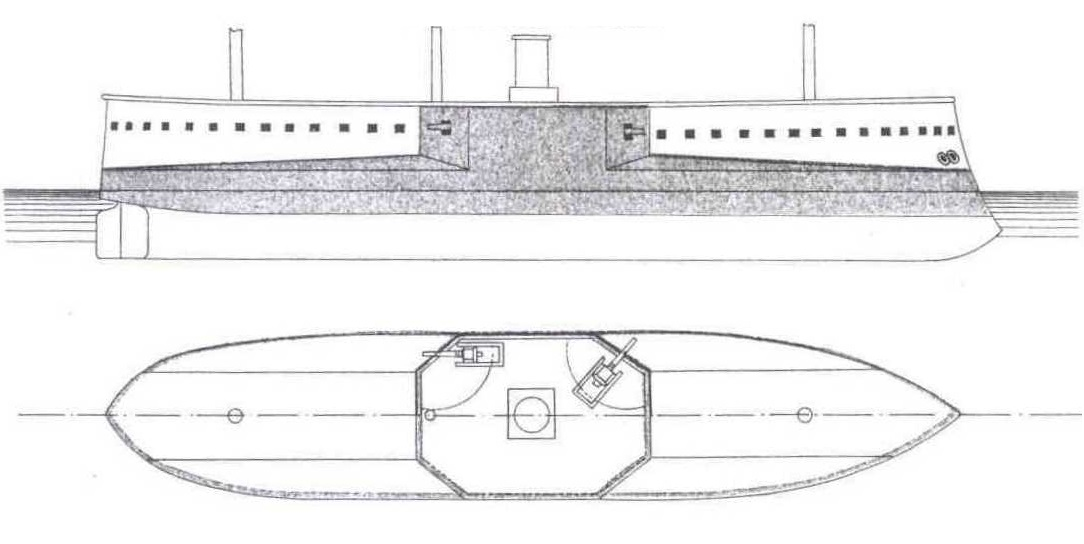
- Line-drawing of the Feth-i Bülend class

History

Ottoman Empire
- Name: Mukaddeme-i Hayir
- Namesake: "Great Abundance"
- Ordered: 1868
- Builder: Imperial Arsenal
- Laid down: 1870
- Launched: 28 October 1872
- Commissioned: 1874
- Decommissioned: 1923
- Fate: Broken up, 1923

General characteristics
- Class & type: Feth-i Bülend class
- Displacement: 2,762 metric tons (2,718 long tons)
- Length: 72 m (236 ft 3 in) (p.p.)
- Beam: 11.9 m (39 ft 1 in)
- Draft: 5.2 m (17 ft 1 in)
- Installed power: 3,250 ihp (2,420 kW); 6 × box boilers
- Propulsion: 1 × compound steam engine; 1 × screw propeller
- Speed: 13 knots (24 km/h; 15 mph)
- Complement: 16 officers, 153 sailors
- Armament: 4 × 229 mm (9 in) Armstrong guns
- Armor: Belt: 229 mm; Casemate: 229 mm

Mukaddeme-i Hayir (Ottoman Turkish: Great Abundance) was the second of two Feth-i Bülend-class ironclads built for the Ottoman Navy in the 1860s. The Ottoman Navy ordered her from the Imperial Arsenal in Constantinople, and she was laid down in 1870, launched in 1872, and commissioned in 1874. She was armed with four 229 mm (9 in) guns, was powered by a single-screw compound steam engine with a top speed of 12 knots (22 km/h; 14 mph). The ship saw action during the Russo-Turkish War of 1877–1878, but was laid up from 1878 to 1897. At the start of the Greco-Turkish War in 1897, the Ottoman Navy mobilized Mukaddeme-I Hayir and the rest of the ironclad fleet but found almost all of the ships to be in unusable condition. Mukaddeme-i Hayir was disarmed the following year and converted into a stationary training ship in 1911. After the outbreak of World War I in 1914, she became a barracks ship, and served in this capacity until 1923, when she was broken up.

== Design ==
Mukaddeme-i Hayir was 72.01 m (236 ft 3 in) long between perpendiculars, with a beam of 11.99 m (39 ft 4 in) and a draft of 5.51 m (18 ft 1 in). The hull was constructed with iron, and displaced 2,762 metric tons (2,718 long tons) normally and 1,601 t (1,576 long tons) BOM. She had a crew of 16 officers and 153 enlisted men.

The ship was powered by a single horizontal compound steam engine which drove one screw propeller. Steam was provided by six coal-fired box boilers that were trunked into a single funnel amidships. The engine was rated at 3,250 indicated horsepower (2,420 kW) and produced a top speed of 12 knots (22 km/h; 14 mph), though decades of poor maintenance had reduced the ship's maximum speed to 8 kn (15 km/h; 9.2 mph) by 1892. Mukaddeme-i Hayir carried 270 t (270 long tons; 300 short tons) of coal. A supplementary sailing rig was also fitted.

The ship was armed with a battery of four 229 mm (9 in) rifled, muzzle-loading Armstrong guns mounted in a central, armored casemate, two guns per side. The guns were positioned so as to allow any two to fire directly ahead, astern, or to either broadside. The casemate had heavy armor protection, with the gun battery protected by 229 mm of iron plating. The upper section of the casemate had thinner armor, at 150 mm (5.9 in) thick. The hull had a complete armored belt at the waterline, which extended 0.6 m (2 ft) above the line and 1.2 m (4 ft) below. The above-water portion was 222 mm thick, while the submerged part was 150 mm thick.

== Service history ==
Mukaddeme-i Hayir, meaning "Great Abundance", was ordered in 1868 from the Imperial Arsenal in 1868, a copy of her British-built sister ship Feth-i Bülend. The vessel was laid down in 1870 and launched on 28 October 1872. She began sea trials in 1874 and was commissioned later that year. Early in the ship's career, the Ottoman ironclad fleet was activated every summer for short cruises from the Golden Horn to the Bosporus to ensure their propulsion systems were in operable condition.

The ship's only period of significant activity came three years later, with the outbreak of the Russo-Turkish War, which began on 24 April 1877. The Ottoman fleet had already mobilized in September 1876 and begun preparing for conflict, as tensions with Russia had been growing for several years, an insurrection had begun in Ottoman Bosnia in mid-1875, and Serbia had declared war on the Ottoman Empire in July 1876. At the onset of hostilities with Russia, Mukaddeme-i Hayir was based in Sulina with several other ironclads.

On 14 May 1877, an Ottoman squadron consisting of Mukaddeme-i Hayir, Feth-i Bülend, Necm-i Şevket, Muin-i Zafer, Avnillah, and Iclaliye bombarded Russian positions before landing infantry to capture of the Black Sea port of Sokhumi two days later. On the 31st, Mukaddeme-i Hayir, Feth-i Bülend, the steam frigate Mubir-i Sürur, and several other ships departed Batumi for Trabzon to bring ground troops to Varna to defend against an expected Russian attack across the Danube. By June, Mukaddeme-i Hayir had returned to Sulina at the mouth of the Danube, where she assisted in the defense of the town, along with a gunboat and an armed tugboat. Starting in November, a Russian flotilla of small vessels attempted to lay a minefield off Sulina to block the Ottoman vessels. On 8 November, the Ottoman gunboat was sunk by the mines, and Mukaddeme-i Hayir steamed out to engage the Russian vessels, forcing them to withdraw before they could complete the minefield. The next day, the Russians returned with mortar-equipped gunboats; neither side scored any hits before each flotilla withdrew.

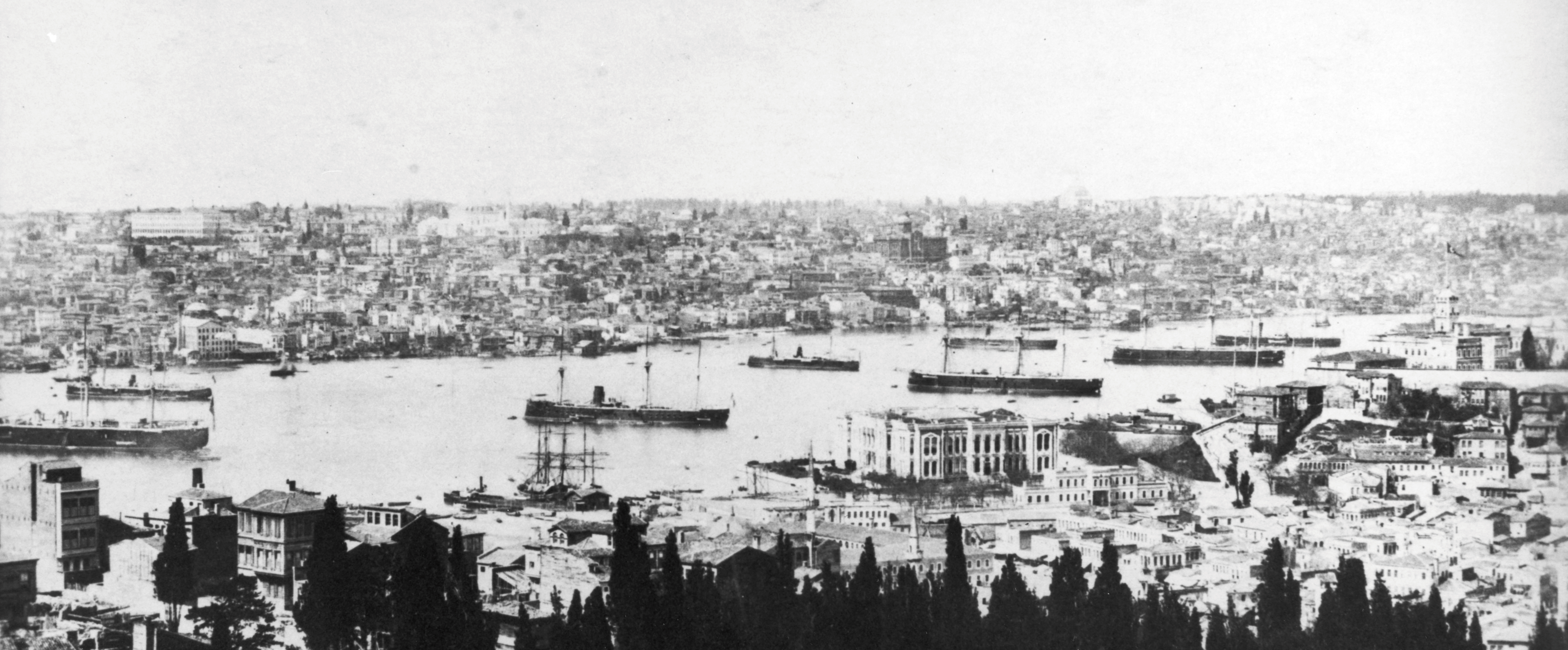
The Ottoman ironclad fleet in the Golden Horn

In 1878, the ship was laid up in Constantinople, and she remained inactive for almost 20 years. The annual summer cruises to the Bosporus ended. By the mid-1880s, the Ottoman ironclad fleet was in poor condition, and Mukkademe-i Hayir was unable to go to sea. Many of the ships' engines were unusable, having seized up from rust, and their hulls were badly fouled. The British naval attache to the Ottoman Empire at the time estimated that the Imperial Arsenal would take six months to get just five of the ironclads ready to go to sea. Throughout this period, the ship's crew was limited to about one-third the normal figure. During this period of inactivity, she was modernized slightly in 1882, with the addition of several light guns. These included a pair of 87 mm (3.4 in) Krupp guns, two 63.5 mm (2.50 in) Krupp guns, two 37 mm (1.5 in) guns, and two 25.4 mm (1 in) Nordenfelt guns. By January 1886, Mukaddeme-i Hayir had been stationed in Tripoli in Ottoman Libya; at that time, she was the only Ottoman ironclad in active service.

In February 1897, a Greek uprising against Ottoman rule broke out on Crete, prompting the Great Powers to deploy the International Squadron – a multinational force made up of ships of the Austro-Hungarian Navy, French Navy, Imperial German Navy, Italian Royal Navy (Regia Marina), Imperial Russian Navy, and British Royal Navy – to Cretan waters to intervene in the uprising. The squadron′s senior admirals formed an "Admirals Council" that manage affairs on Crete until the uprising came to an end in December 1898. Events on Crete led to the start of the Greco-Turkish War of April–May 1897. In anticipation of the war breaking out, the Ottomans inspected the fleet in February 1897 and found that almost all of the vessels, including Mukaddeme-i Hayir, were completely unfit for combat against the Greek Navy. Through April and May 1897, the Ottoman fleet made several sorties into the Aegean Sea in an attempt to raise morale among the ships' crews, though the Ottomans had no intention of attacking Greek forces.

In 1898, Mukaddeme-i Hayir had her guns removed and placed ashore; her boilers also were removed. Following the end of the war with Greece in May 1897, the Ottoman government decided to begin a naval reconstruction program. The first stage was to rebuild the older armored warships, including Mukaddeme-i Hayir. The Ottomans contacted several foreign shipyards, and Krupp's Germaniawerft received the contract to rebuild Mukaddeme-i Hayir on 11 August 1900, but the deal was cancelled and the ship was not reconstructed. In 1911, she was converted into a stationary training ship, and after the outbreak of World War I in 1914, she became a barracks ship. Mukaddeme-i Hayir was transferred to İzmit in 1920, where she continued to serve as a barracks ship. She was decommissioned in September 1923 and broken up for scrap in İzmit.
