= Ottoman ironclad Feth-i Bülend =

Ironclad warship of the Ottoman Navy

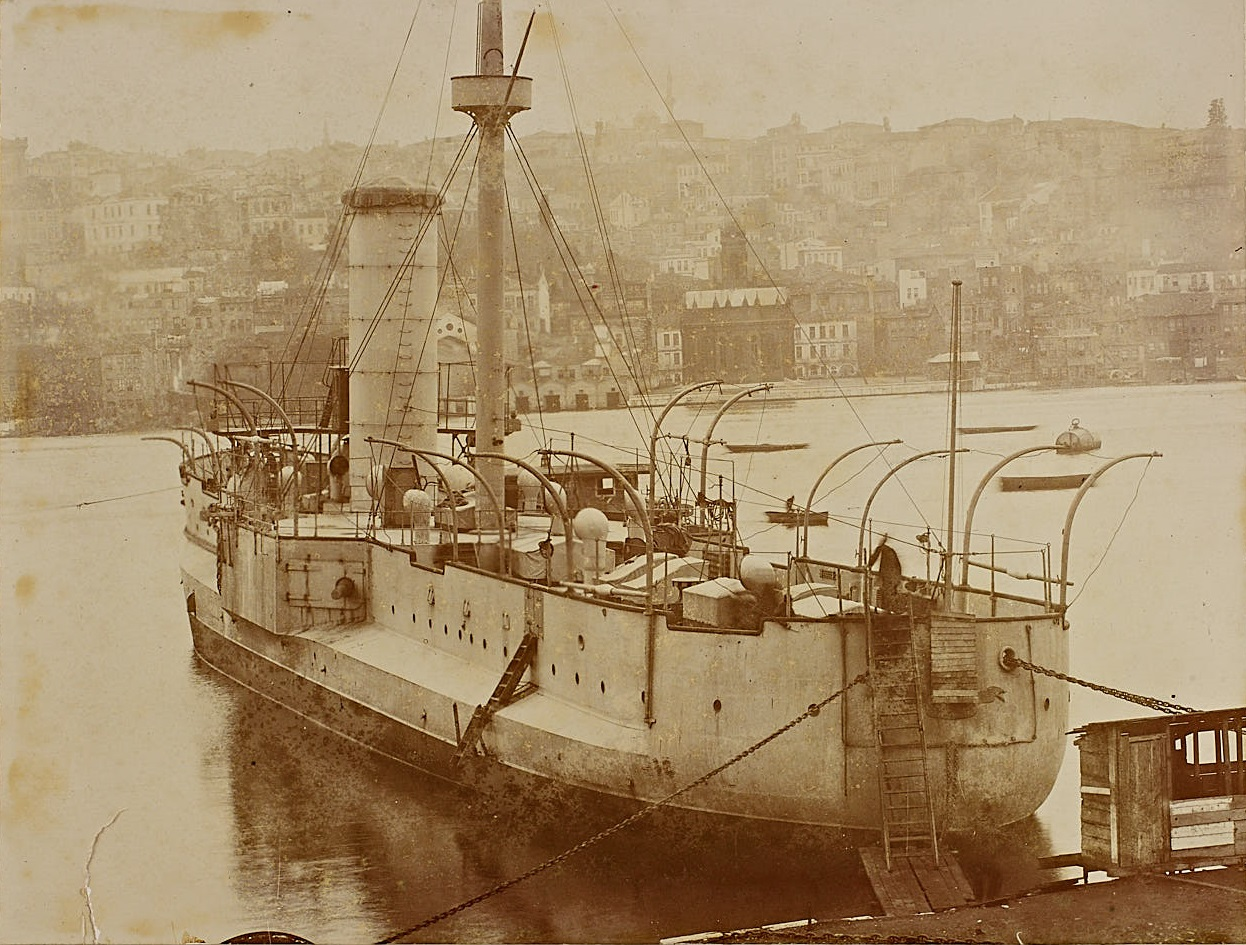
- Feth-i Bülend during repairs in Ansaldo factory.

History

Ottoman Empire
- Name: Feth-i Bülend
- Builder: Thames Iron Works, London
- Laid down: May 1868
- Launched: 1869
- Commissioned: 1870
- Fate: Sunk, 31 October 1912

General characteristics
- Class & type: Feth-i Bülend class
- Displacement: 2,762 metric tons (2,718 long tons)
- Length: 72 m (236 ft 3 in) (p.p.)
- Beam: 11.9 m (39 ft 1 in)
- Draft: 5.2 m (17 ft 1 in)
- Installed power: 3,250 ihp (2,420 kW); 6 × box boilers
- Propulsion: 1 × compound steam engine; 1 × screw propeller
- Speed: 13 knots (24 km/h; 15 mph)
- Complement: 16 officers, 153 sailors
- Armament: 4 × 229 mm (9 in) Armstrong guns
- Armor: Belt: 229 mm; Casemate: 229 mm

Feth-i Bülend (Ottoman Turkish: "Great Victory") was an Ottoman ironclad warship built in the late 1860s, the lead ship of her class. The Ottoman Navy ordered her from the British Thames Iron Works, and she was laid down in 1868, launched in 1869, and commissioned in 1870. She was armed with four 229 mm (9 in) guns, was powered by a single-screw compound steam engine with a top speed of 13 knots (24 km/h; 15 mph).

Feth-i Bülend saw action during the Russo-Turkish War of 1877–1878, where she battled the Russian steamer Vesta in an inconclusive engagement. The Ottoman fleet was laid up for most of the next twenty years, and Feth-i Bülend saw no activity during this period. Modernized in 1890, she was nevertheless still not in condition for active service at the outbreak of the Greco-Turkish War in 1897. She was therefore heavily rebuilt in Germany between 1903 and 1907. At the start of the First Balkan War in 1912, the ship was stationed in Salonica; the ship was disarmed so the guns could be used to strengthen the port's fortifications. On the night of 31 October, a Greek torpedo boat slipped into the harbor and sank Feth-i Bülend, killing seven of her crew.

== Design ==
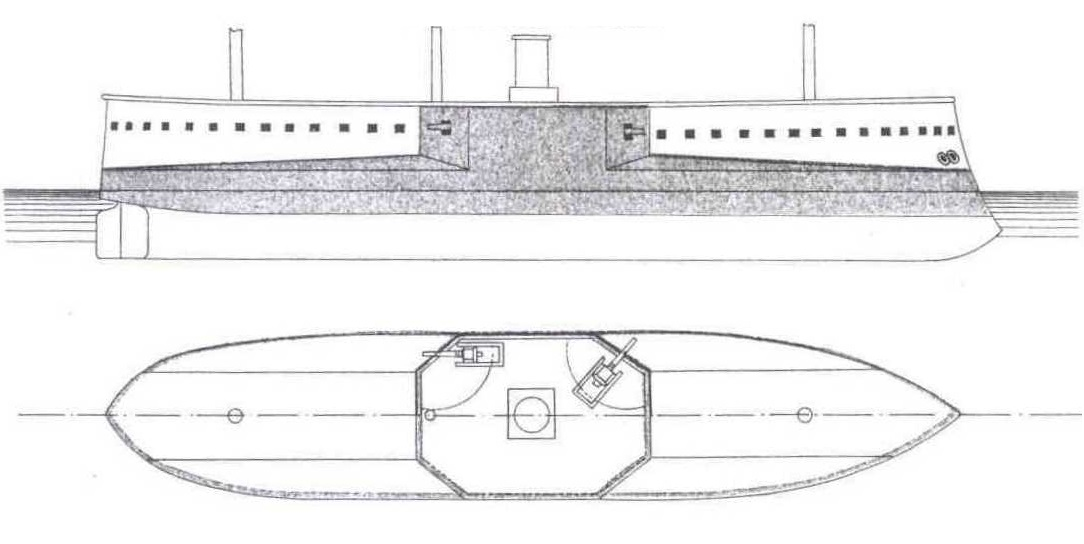
Line-drawing of Feth-i Bülend

Feth-i Bülend was 72.01 m (236 ft 3 in) long between perpendiculars, with a beam of 11.99 m (39 ft 4 in) and a draft of 5.51 m (18 ft 1 in). The hull was constructed with iron, and displaced 2,762 metric tons (2,718 long tons) normally and 1,601 t (1,576 long tons) BOM. She had a crew of 16 officers and 153 enlisted men.

The ship was powered by a single horizontal compound steam engine which drove one screw propeller. Steam was provided by six coal-fired box boilers that were trunked into a single funnel amidships. The engine was rated at 3,250 indicated horsepower (2,420 kW) and produced a top speed of 13 knots (24 km/h; 15 mph), though by 1877 she was only capable of 10 knots (19 km/h; 12 mph). Decades of poor maintenance had reduced the ship's speed to 8 knots (15 km/h; 9.2 mph) by 1892. Feth-i Bülend carried 600 t (590 long tons; 660 short tons) of coal. A supplementary sailing rig was also fitted.

The ship was armed with a battery of four 222 mm (8.7 in) muzzle-loading Armstrong guns mounted in a central, armored casemate, two guns per side. The guns were positioned so as to allow any two to fire directly ahead, astern, or to either broadside. The casemate had heavy armor protection, with the gun battery protected by 222 mm of iron plating. The upper section of the casemate had thinner armor, at 150 mm (5.9 in) thick. The hull had a complete armored belt at the waterline, which extended 0.6 m (2 ft) above the line and 1.2 m (4 ft) below. The above-water portion was 222 mm thick, while the submerged part was 150 mm thick.

== Service history ==
=== Construction and the Russo-Turkish War ===
Feth-i Bülend, meaning "Great Victory", was ordered in 1867 from the Thames Iron Works, Blackwall Yard in London and was laid down in May 1868. She was launched in 1869 and began sea trials in 1870, being commissioned into the Ottoman Navy later that year. Upon completion, Feth-i Bülend and the other ironclads then being built in Britain and France were sent to Crete to assist in stabilizing the island in the aftermath of the Cretan Revolt of 1866–1869. During this period, the Ottoman fleet, under Hobart Pasha, remained largely inactive, with training confined to reading translated British instruction manuals. Early in the ship's career, the Ottoman ironclad fleet was activated every summer for short cruises from the Golden Horn to the Bosporus to ensure their propulsion systems were in operable condition.

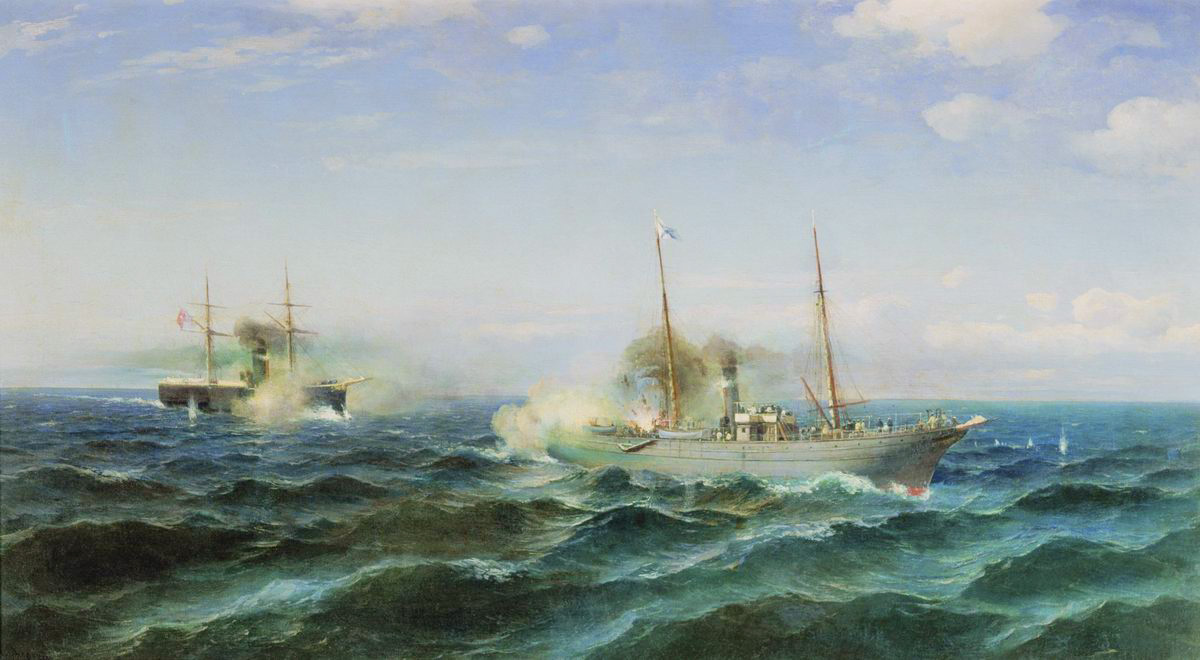
Painting depicting Feth-i Bülend's (left) battle with Vesta (center)

Feth-i Bülend saw extensive service in the Black Sea during the Russo-Turkish War of 1877–1878, based primarily at Batumi. She took part in the bombardment of Russian positions and capture of the Black Sea port of Sokhumi on 14–16 May 1877. On 23 July, she engaged the Russian armed steamer Vesta in an inconclusive action. Poor visibility from smoke and escaping steam forced the ships to disengage, both with slight damage and few casualties. On the 31st, Feth-i Bülend, her sister ship Mukaddeme-i Hayir, the steam frigate Mubir-i Sürur, and several other ships departed Sochum for Trabzon to bring ground troops to Varna to defend against an expected Russian attack across the Danube. The Ottoman fleet then returned to Batumi, where it remained largely inactive. During a patrol on 25 August, Feth-i Bülend encountered the Russian yacht Livadia, but the Russian vessel fled before Feth-i Bülend could close to effective range.

=== Inactivity in the 1880s and 1890s ===
Following the Ottoman defeat in 1878, the ship was laid up in Constantinople. The annual summer cruises to the Bosporus ended. By the mid-1880s, the Ottoman ironclad fleet was in poor condition, and Feth-i Bülend was unable to go to sea. Many of the ships' engines were unusable, having seized up from rust, and their hulls were badly fouled. The British naval attache to the Ottoman Empire at the time estimated that the Imperial Arsenal would take six months to get just five of the ironclads ready to go to sea. Throughout this period, the ship's crew was limited to about one-third the normal figure. During a period of tension with Greece in 1886, the fleet was brought to full crews and the ships were prepared to go to sea, but none actually left the Golden Horn, and they were quickly laid up again. By that time, most of the ships were capable of little more than 4 to 6 knots (7.4 to 11.1 km/h; 4.6 to 6.9 mph).

The fleet remained inactive at the Golden Horn for twenty years, though in October 1889, Feth-i Bülend left the Golden Horn to escort the German Emperor, Kaiser Wilhelm II, during a state visit to the Ottoman Empire. She accompanied Wilhelm as he cruised though the Dardanelles and the Sea of Marmara to Constantinople. Feth-i Bülend was refitted at the Imperial Arsenal in 1890. During this refit, several small guns were installed, including a pair of 87 mm (3.4 in) Krupp guns, two 63 mm (2.5 in) guns, two 37 mm (1.5 in) guns, and one 25.4 mm (1 in) Nordenfelt gun. In 1892, Feth-i Bülend and the ironclad Asar-i Tevfik were ordered to reinforce the Cretan Squadron during a period of unrest on the island, but neither vessel was capable of going to sea, owing to leaky boiler tubes. At the start of the Greco-Turkish War in February 1897, the Ottomans inspected the fleet and found that almost all of the vessels, including Feth-i Bülend, to be completely unfit for combat against the Greek Navy.

=== Reconstruction and loss ===
Following the end of the war, the government decided to begin a naval reconstruction program. The first stage was to rebuild the older armored warships, including Feth-i Bülend. The Ottomans contacted several foreign shipyards; initially, Krupp's Germaniawerft received the contract to rebuild Feth-i Bülend on 11 August 1900, but by December 1902, the Ottomans had reached an agreement with Armstrong-Ansaldo in Genoa to rebuild the vessel. The work was conducted between 1903 and 1907. The ship was reboilered with a pair of water-tube boilers manufactured by the Imperial Arsenal, which improved speed slightly to 9 kn (17 km/h; 10 mph). Her armament was completely replaced with new, quick-firing guns manufactured by Krupp. Four 15 cm SK L/40 guns were mounted in the casemate, and six 75 mm (3 in) guns and six 57 mm (2.2 in) guns were installed on the upper deck.

At the outbreak of the Italo-Turkish War of 1911–1912, Feth-i Bülend was assigned to the Reserve Division, and she saw no action during the conflict. Instead, she was disarmed and most of her weapons—including all four 15 cm guns, and four each of the 75 mm and 57 mm guns—were used to bolster the defenses of Salonica's harbor. The guns were manned by 90 of the ship's crew. The ship itself was converted to a barracks ship. At the time of the outbreak of the First Balkan War on 18 October 1912, the ship's commander was Captain (Binbaşi) Aziz Mahmut Bey, who also functioned as the naval garrison commander. On the night of 31 October, the Greek torpedo boat No. 11 passed by the shore batteries and searchlights and through the mine barrages at 22:20. She launched three torpedoes at 23:30 against Feth-i Bülend. One torpedo missed, hitting the quay, but the two others hit the ship, causing her to capsize and sink. Seven of its crew, including the ship's imam, were killed in the sinking, while the Greek vessel exited the harbor by the same route without further incident.
