= Augustus Charles Hobart-Hampden =

British admiral (1822–1886)

Augustus Charles Hobart-Hampden Pasha
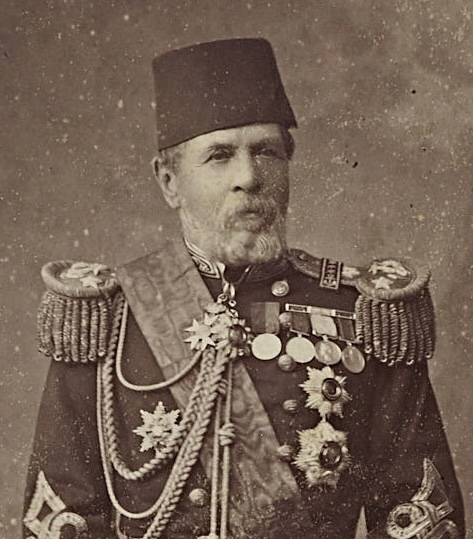
- Hobart-Hampden in the 1870s
- Born: 1 April 1822; Walton-on the-Wolds, Leicestershire, UKGBI
- Died: 19 June 1886 (aged 64); Milan, Kingdom of Italy
- Resting place: Haydarpaşa Cemetery
- Education: Britannia Royal Naval College
- Spouse(s): Mary Anne Hobart-Hampden (m. 1848; died 1877) Edith Katherine Hobart-Hampde (m. 1879)
- Relatives: Vere Hobart, Lord Hobart (brother); Sidney Hobart-Hampden-Mercer-Henderson, 7th Earl of Buckinghamshire (nephew); Roland Vaughan Williams (cousin); Sir Edward Vaughan Williams (uncle); Herbert F. Hore (father-in-law); John Williams (grandfather)
- Military career
- Allegiance: British Empire (1835–1862); Ottoman Empire (1867–)
- Branch: Royal Navy; Ottoman Navy
- Rank: Captain; Mushir
- Nickname: Hobart Pasha
- Conflicts: Russo-Turkish War (1877–78)

Signature
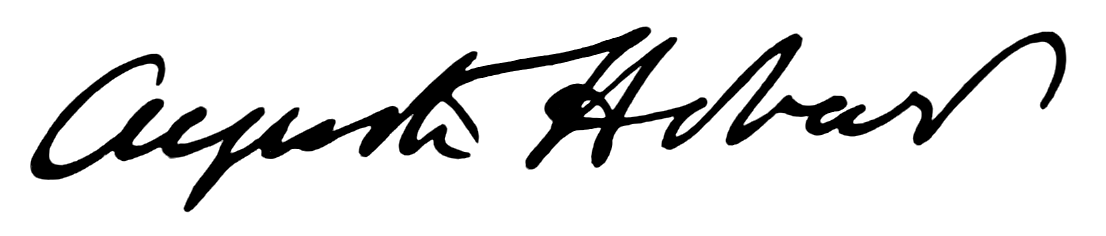

Augustus Charles Hobart-Hampden Pasha (1 April 1822 – 19 June 1886), also known as Hobart Pasha, was a British Captain, blockade runner and later Ottoman Mushir.

== Early life ==
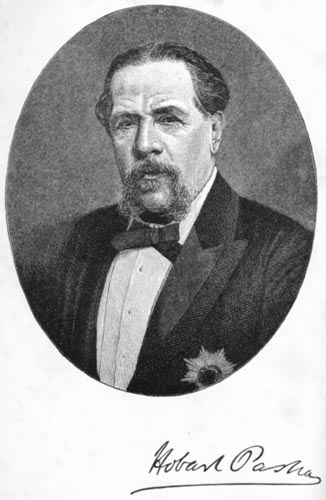
Hobart Pasha in civilian attire

Hobart-Hampden was born on 1 April 1822 in Walton-on the-Wolds, Leicestershire to Augustus Edward Hobart-Hampden, 6th Earl of Buckinghamshire and Mary Hobart-Hampden (née Williams). Through his mother, Hobart-Hampden was the grandson of John Williams, a barrister, and was the nephew of Sir Edward Vaughan Williams, a judge. The third of four brothers, Hobart-Hampden was the younger brother of Vere Hobart, Lord Hobart, a colonial administrator, the uncle of Sidney Hobart-Hampden-Mercer-Henderson, 7th Earl of Buckinghamshire and the cousin of Roland Vaughan Williams.

Hobart-Hampden was educated at Cheam School.

== Career ==
=== Royal Navy ===
In 1835 he entered the Royal Navy and served as a midshipman on the coast of Brazil in the suppression of the slave trade, displaying much gallantry in the operations. In 1842 he passed his examinations at Britannia Royal Naval College. In 1855 he took part, as captain of HMS Driver in the Baltic Expedition, and was actively engaged at Bomarsund and Åbo. As a reward he was promoted to the rank of commander.

In 1862 he retired from the navy with the rank of Captain.

=== Blockade runner ===
During the American Civil War, to take the command of a blockade runner. He had the good fortune to run the blockade eighteen times, conveying war material to Charleston and returning with a cargo of cotton.

=== Ottoman Navy ===
In 1867 he became “naval adviser to the Ottoman Sultan by his brother's recommendation.” He was immediately nominated to the command of that fleet, with the rank of "Bahriye Livasi" (rear-admiral). In this capacity he performed splendid service in helping to suppress the insurrection in Crete, and was rewarded by the Sultan with the title of Pasha (1869). In 1874 Hobart, whose name had, on representations made by Greece, been removed from the British Navy Directory, was reinstated; his restoration did not, however, last long, for on the outbreak of the Russo-Turkish war he again entered Ottoman service.

On the conclusion of peace Hobart still remained in Ottoman service, and in 1881 was appointed Mushir, being the first Christian to hold that high office.

=== Publications ===
He recorded his adventures in the book Never Caught, published in 1867.

In 1887, ‘Sketches.’ Hobart's ‘Sketches of My Life’ was posthumously published and edited by his wife Edith.

== Personal life ==
In 1848, Hobart-Hampden married Mary Anne Hobart-Hampden (née Colquhoun Grant; died 1877).

On 5 May 1879, Hobart-Hampden married Edith Katherine Hobart-Hampden (née Hore), the daughter of Herbert F. Hore, in Vienna.

On 19 June 1886 Hobart-Hampden died in Milan, aged 64. Repatriated to Constantinople, Hobart-Hampden's was buried at Haydarpaşa Cemetery.
