= Russian yacht Livadia =

Two yachts of the Russian Navy have been named Livadia:

- Russian yacht Livadia (1873)
- Russian yacht Livadia (1880)
