= Gulyayev =

Gulyayev or Gulyaev (Russian: Гуляев) and Gulyayeva, Gulyaeva or Guliaeva (Russian: Гуляева; feminine) is a common Russian surname. It may refer to:

- Boris Gulyayev (born 1941), Soviet speed skater
- Erast Gulyaev (1846–1919), Russian naval architect
- Nikolay Gulyayev (born 1966), Soviet speed skater
- Nikolay Gulyayev (1915–2000), Russian football coach and former player
- Vadim Gulyayev (1941–1998), Russian water polo player
- Yuri Gulyayev (disambiguation), several people
- Yelena Gulyayeva (born 1967), Soviet high jumper

== See also ==
- 6783 Gulyaev, a main-belt asteroid
