= Derzhava =

Derzhava may refer to:

- Derzhava (Russian party), a Russian populist, nationalist party founded by Alexander Rutskoy
- Derzhava (Ukrainian party), a Ukrainian political party that formed a coalition with the Progressive Socialist Party of Ukraine after the Orange Revolution
- Derzhava (yacht), an 1871 royal yacht employed by the Tsar of Russia
- The Ukrainian State (Українська держава, Ukrajinśka Deržava)
- Derzhava, a merchant ship crewed by Mariusz Zaruski
- Derzhava, a bank in Russia
