= Russian ship Pyotr Veliky =

At least three ships of the Russian navy have borne the name Pyotr Veliky, Petr Veliky or Pyotr Velikiy (Пётр Вели́кий), in honor of Peter the Great:

- Russian ironclad Petr Veliky, an ironclad warship launched in 1872.
- Russian icebreaker Pyotr Veliky, an icebreaker launched in 1912.
- Russian battlecruiser Pyotr Velikiy, a Kirov-class battlecruiser originally named Yuri Andropov, launched in 1996.
