= Russian yacht Livadia (1880) =

Imperial Russian yacht

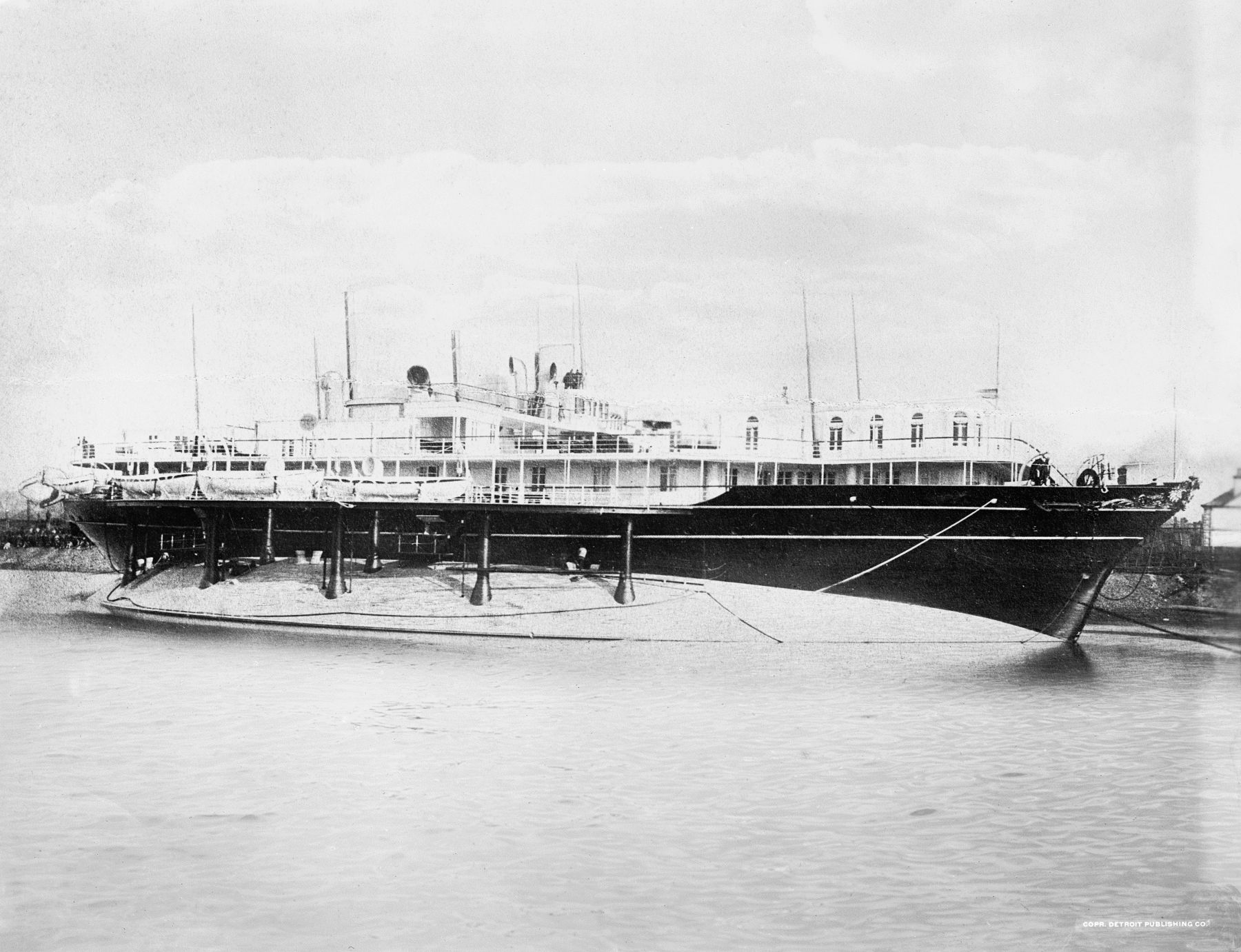
- The Livadia with her gray tumblehome pontoon exposed.

History

Russian Empire
- Name: Livadia
- Namesake: Livadia Palace
- Owner: Imperial Russian Navy
- Ordered: 5 September 1879
- Builder: John Elder & Co.; Govan, Scotland
- Laid down: 1879 (Official ceremony: 25 March 1880)
- Launched: 7 July 1880
- Commissioned: 30 September 1880
- Decommissioned: 1883 (hulked as Opyt); 1926 (written off)
- Fate: Scrapped

General characteristics
- Class & type: Powered yacht
- Displacement: 4,420 tons; 4,500 tons
- Length: 71.63 m (submerged hull); 79.25 m (overall)
- Beam: 46.64 m (submerged hull); 33.53 (superstructure)
- Draft: 2.1 m (excluding propellers)
- Propulsion: 3 steam engines (10,500 indicated h.p. standard, 12,354 i.h.p maximum), 10 coal-fired boilers
- Speed: 14 knots (15.725 knots maximum)
- Complement: 24 officers, 321 sailors and attendants (1880)

The Livadia was an imperial yacht of the House of Romanov built in 1879–1880 to replace a yacht of the same name that had sunk off the coast of Crimea in 1878. The new Livadia, intended for service on the Black Sea, was a radically novel ship conceived by Vice Admiral Andrey Popov, designed by naval architect Erast Gulyaev and built by John Elder & Co. of Govan on the Clyde. The Livadia continued Popov's line of circular ships although this time Popov sacrificed geometrical perfection for seagoing capabilities. She had a beam of 153 ft (47 m) against overall length of only 259 ft (79 m). An extreme example of tumblehome architecture, she sported a conventionally shaped superstructure mounted on a wide, flat-bottomed, turbot-shaped submerged hull or pontoon.

Construction of the Livadia, "a gigantic life-size experiment" and a prototype for next-generation battleships, was supervised by William Pearce. Bruno Tideman and Edward James Reed acted as consultants, William Leiper and William De Morgan designed luxurious interiors. The Livadia turned out a surprisingly maneuverable and stable ship with a respectable maximum speed of 15.7 knots and her efficiency was comparable to conventional ships. Her performance at sea trials surprised most naval architects and was attributed to the favorable placement of the propellers.

The maiden voyage of the Livadia revealed that her wide flat bottom was highly prone to damage by wave slamming. She spent her brief career as a yacht in the docks and was used for her intended purpose only once, carrying Grand Dukes Constantine and Mikhail across the Black Sea. Alexander III had no interest in resurrecting an inherently flawed ship, and in August 1881 Livadia was moored in Nikolaev and then hulked and stripped of her former luxuries. Her engines were removed and reused on the Russian cruisers. The rusty hulk saw some use during World War I and was finally decommissioned in 1926.

== Background ==
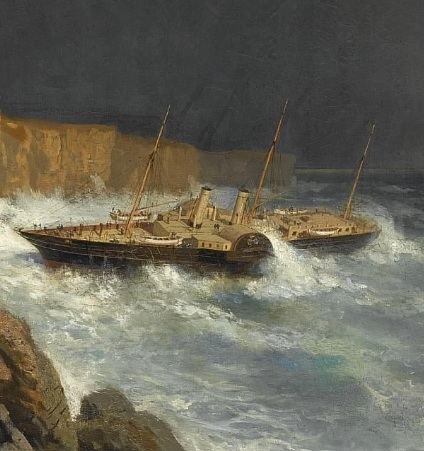
The Wreck of the Livadia in 1878 (detail) by Alexey Bogolyubov, sold at Sotheby's in November 2007 for £180,000

The first Livadia was built in 1869–1873 by Leopold Schwede. She was a wooden seagoing paddle steamer displacing 1965 tons, 81 metres long and 10.9 metres wide (excluding wheel housings). The yacht was stationed in Crimea and tended to the Romanovs from the summer of 1873. After the outbreak of the Russo-Turkish War of 1877–1878 she was converted into an auxiliary cruiser. She sank a Turkish schooner, survived the perils of the war but on the night of 21–22 October 1878 ran aground near Cape Tarkhan-Kut in western Crimea. Salvage attempts failed, and 47 days later the Livadia was destroyed by a violent storm. After the sinking, the Russian Department of the Navy proposed building a similar conventional yacht with improved speed and endurance. Vice Admiral Andrey Popov, the influential chairman of the Naval Technical Commission (MTK), objected and proposed a different concept based on his circular ships.

Naval architects of the 1860s tended to increase the beam and reduce the length of their armored ships. This change of the proportions maximized the internal volume protected by the same amount of side armor. It was heralded by Sir Edward James Reed and taken to its extreme by Popov. Popov's coastal battleships Novgorod and Kiev were perfectly circular in plan. The design attempted to circumvent the limitations of the Treaty of Paris, although construction of the Novgorod and the Kiev began when the treaty had been effectively voided by the outcome of the Franco-Prussian War. Popov wrote that a circular shape results in minimal weight of armor belt for a given displacement. It also minimized the draft of the battleships, which was critical for their intended deployment in the estuary of the Dnieper and the Kerch Strait. Their seagoing capacities, on the contrary, were deemed unimportant. The Novgorod and the Kiev were commissioned in 1873 and 1875. The enormous drag of their wide hulls made their engines ineffective and they could make only 8 knots. Their steering was satisfactory against the stream, and entirely unmanageable downstream. Their rudders were ineffective while their outer propellers disturbed the steering yet had no influence on the speed (and were soon removed). And, finally, these ships were too wide to fit into any existing drydock.

== Design ==
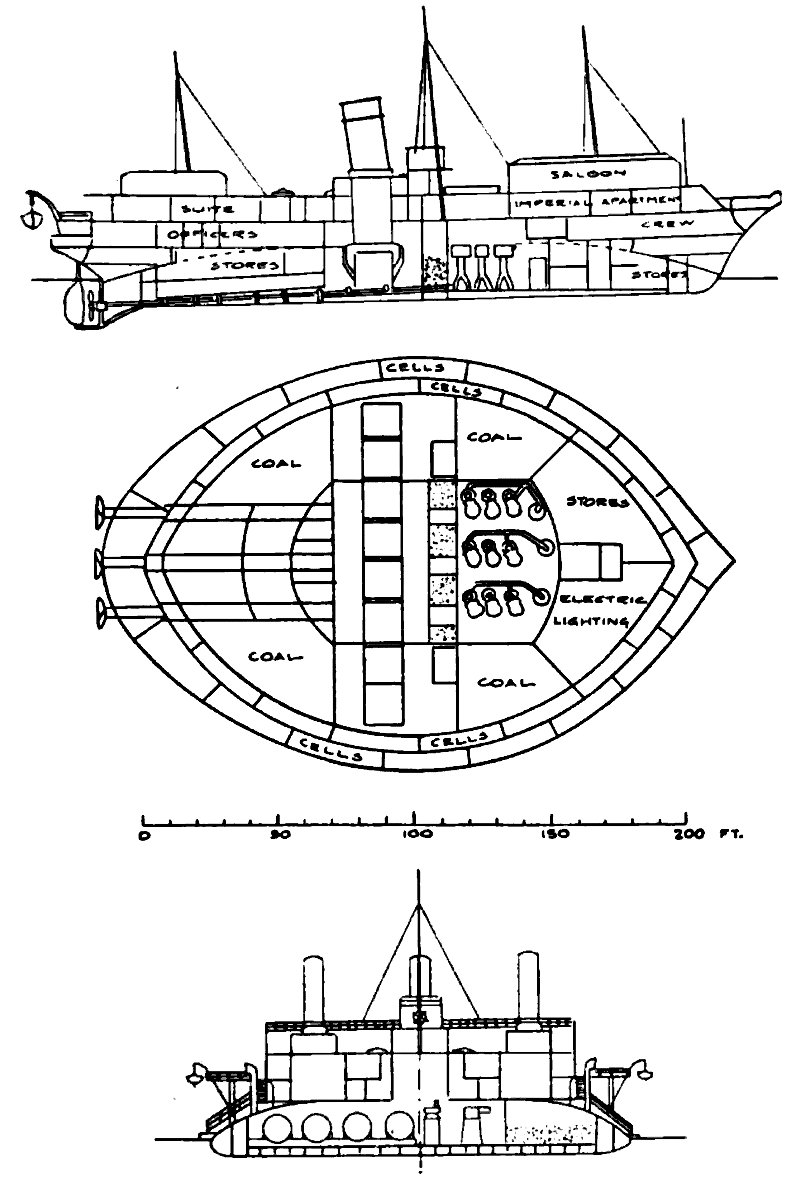
Drawings of the Livadia published by Gulyaev' in Transactions of the Institution of Naval Architects, 1881.

According to Popov, the new imperial yacht should have had a wide, flat-bottomed tumblehome hull and sustainable speed of 14 knots. Popov recruited Erast Gulyaev to produce initial drawings. The main, submerged hull of the new Livadia was 71.63 metres long and 46.64 metres wide. It was compared in shape to a pancake, a turbot, a turtle or even a pair of soup plates. The superstructure perched on the hull was only 33.53 metres wide, and had a clipper bow for an overall length of 79.25 metres. Gulyaev explained that "as the Livadia had to be a yacht, it was decided to make all her qualities subordinate to the utmost safety of navigation, and to the utmost comfort depending on the possible limitation of rolling motion at sea, and on the provision of spacious apartments with a luxurious amount of light and air."

The submerged hull was split into forty watertight compartments. Four housed the steam engines, placed forward, the boilers, electrical systems and store room. The rest were allocated to coal storage. A belt of forty smaller compartments wrapped around the hull, forming a rigid structural frame. Popov sent the drawings to the Dutch naval architect Bruno Tideman, who ran a series of tests of a paraffin wax model in a ship model basin and concluded that the design was feasible. According to Tideman, the ship could reach 14 knots with 8,500 indicated horsepowers, below Popov's earlier estimate of at least 10 thousand horsepower (the first Livadia could make 13 knots on mere 460 horsepower). Tideman insisted that the contract must be awarded to a first-rate firm and that the plans be approved by him.

In the summer of 1879, the drawings were sent to Sir William Pearce of John Elder & Co. Pearce agreed to build it, and in August Tsar Alexander II gave his assent. Pearce and the head of the Baltic Shipyard Mikhail Casi, representing Alexander II, signed the contract on 5 September 1879. Pearce agreed to complete the job by 1 July 1880. The deal excluded interior finishes, to be completed in Russia. Unusually for the period, Pearce agreed to guarantee the speed of an experimental craft. According to the contract, the full price was payable only if the ship attained 15 knots. Under-performance was punishable by hefty liquidated damages, and the Russians reserved the right for a full money back guarantee if the ship failed to make 14 knots. They agreed to pay generous premiums if speed and engine power exceeded design targets of 15 knots and 12,000 indicated horsepowers. Pearce was instructed to build his own state-of-the-art steam engines, with no cap on maximum power output. The Russians subscribed to supply the complete electrical system, including arc lighting by Yablochkov candles. The British press discussed the unusual project and concluded it was a test bed for future military ships and their powerplants in particular.

== Construction and trials ==
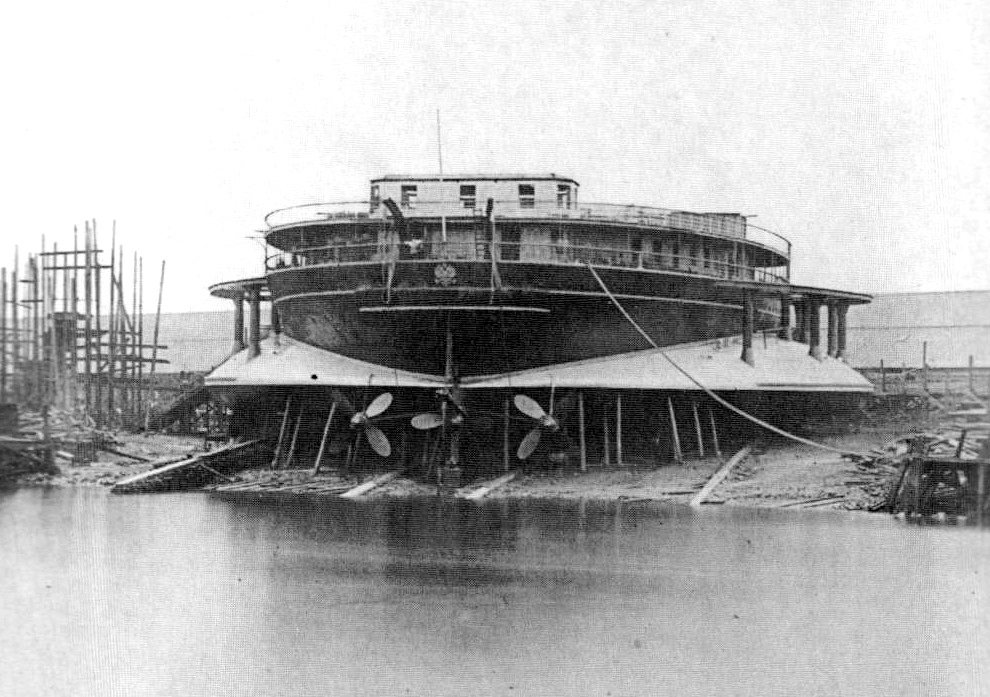
The Livadia on a slipway.

The pontoon hull was built of soft Siemens steel framing 11 millimeters thick sheet iron. In November 1879, when the double bottom was two-thirds complete (but not formally laid down yet), Popov persuaded the imperial authorities to award interior finishes contact to the British, and hired Tideman to review the design again. Tideman built another 1:10 scale model, ran another series of tests and recommended changes to the powerplant and propeller arrangement that caused a significant extension of the contract. The Livadia had a double, perfectly flat bottom and only 7 ft (2.1 m) of draft, excluding the propellers. Their blades projected 9 feet below the hull. Tideman found what he claimed was near-perfect propeller configuration: all three screws had the same diameter but varied in blade pitch, which in practice required running the engines at different revolutions per minute.

The Livadia was launched on 7 July 1880 in front of ten thousand spectators and visitors which included Grand Duke Alexey, the future General Admiral of the Imperial Navy. She was christened by the Duchess of Hamilton. The visitors were impressed by the size and luxury of the ship's interiors which had been designed by William Leiper and William De Morgan and mostly completed before the launch. The decorators had used Louis XIV style for the reception rooms, "Crimean-Tartar style" for the drawing rooms and "the simple kind of modern English style" for the private rooms. The total volume of the royal apartments reached 3,950 cubic meters, 6.7 times more than on the first Livadia. Reporters hailed the technological novelties of the Livadia: she had, in total, 23 steam engines for different jobs including powered steering. The on-board water supply system had backup accumulators that maintained pressure even when steam pumps were not at work. The show on River Clyde inspired Algernon Charles Swinburne's unforgiving poem which ended with a prophecy:

And fear at hand for pilot over sea,
With death for compass and despair for star
And the white foam a shroud for the White Czar.

The engines and coal-fired boilers were installed in August. Pearce used steel for the powerplant and manganese bronze for the propellers and claimed that his engines were the world's most powerful for their weight. Back in Russia, terrorists were hunting down Alexander II, and the British press rumored that the Livadia "was about to be blown by the Nihilists' infernal machines". According to The Herald of Glasgow, Russian authorities notified Glasgow police of a plot to place nitroglycerin time bombs into the ship's coal bunkers. The coal was unloaded, the divers examined the bottom of the ship and found no trace of the bomb or the three alleged terrorists. The Livadia did suffer an explosion - her boilers ruptured during cold pressure tests. The accident was traced back to hot bending of the Livadia's boiler plates. It became a textbook example of unacceptable practice and instilled "a very justifiable dread of bending such plates while hot" into contemporary boilermakers. Despite this setback, the Livadia was completely fitted out in three months.

On 24 September 1880 Pearce personally steered the Livadia from Govan to Greenock and then into the Firth of Clyde, reaching 12 knots. Tideman, present at the trials, wrote that the ship steered "like a yawl." Next day, the Livadia ran her first, unofficial, speed trial and made 15 knots. On 26 September the Livadia performed six hour long official trials presided by Russian Admiral Ivan Likhachev. She reached 14.88 knots with the engines running at 10,200 horsepowers. This time Tideman recorded somewhat wider than expected turn radius under full power, but deemed it unimportant: the Livadia could still turn on a dime by disengaging one of the side propellers. On 27 September the Livadia reached her top recorded speed of 15.725 knots at 12,354 horsepower. Reports by Gulyaev and Reed compared Livadia to contemporary HMS Penelope, HMS Orion and HMS Iris which had similar displacements and engine power, and concluded that her efficiency was on par with conventional ships.

On 30 September the Russian crew of 24 officers and 321 enlisted men boarded the ship, raised the flag of Saint Andrew and began preparations for a homeward voyage. Their captain, Ippolit Vogak, had earlier commanded Popov's Novgorod and Petr Veliky. Pearce completed his job and was rewarded with 414,000 roubles premium in addition to 2,700,000 roubles base contract price.

== Maiden voyage ==
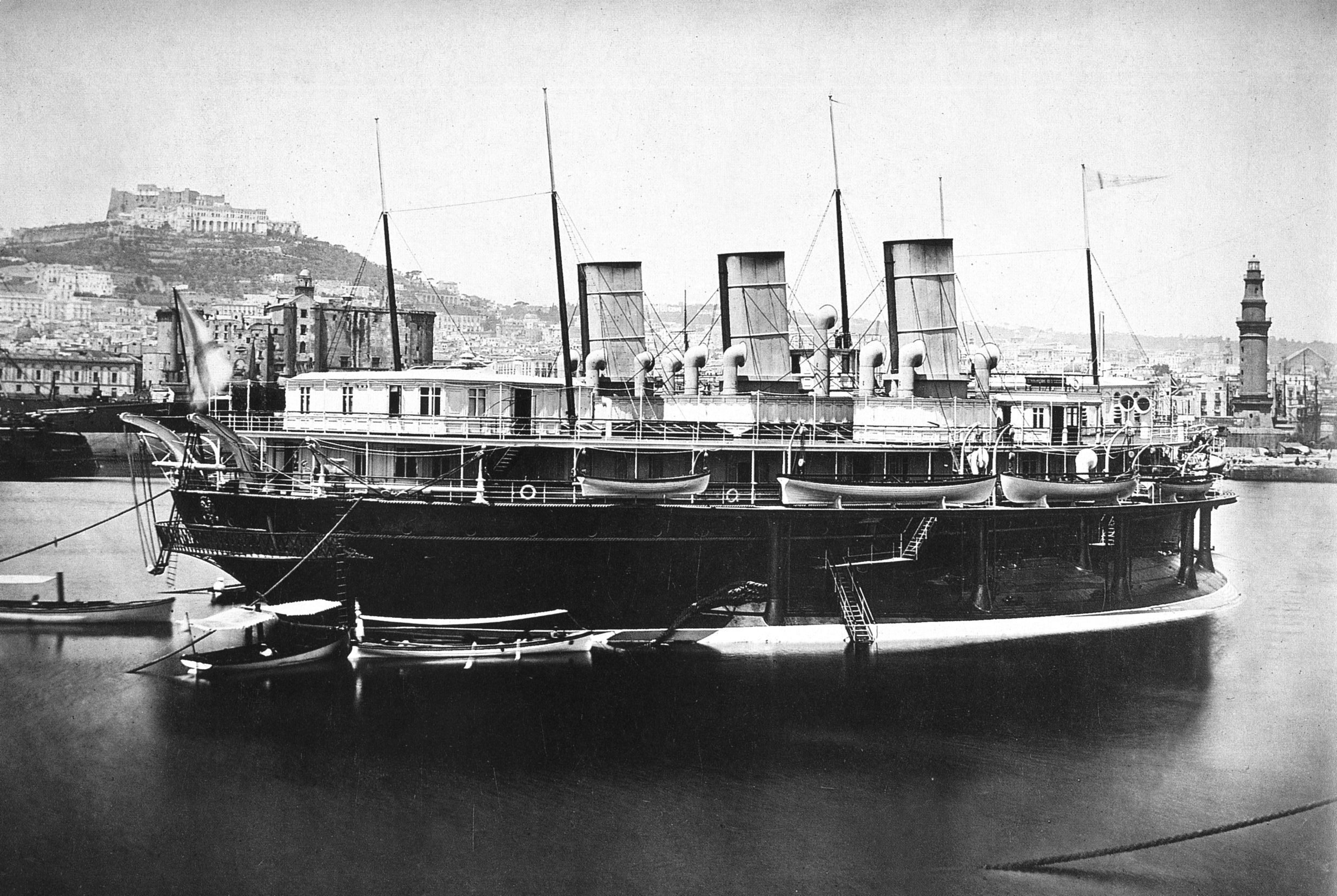
Rear right view of Livadia. The three funnels were mounted transversely

The Livadia left Greenock on 3 October with Popov, Tideman, Edward James Reed and William Houston Stewart on board. She safely reached Brest on 7 October, where she picked up General Admiral of the Imperial Navy Grand Duke Constantine. On 8 October the Livadia sailed into the Bay of Biscay and was soon caught in a violent storm. According to Reed, sailing straight into the storm to test the ship was Constantine's idea and that no Russian dared to argue. Waves of six to seven meters failed to upset the Livadia: transverse roll did not exceed 3.5 degrees, longitudinal pitch was within 5.5 degrees. Stewart praised the comfort of the Livadia: "I never was in so comfortable a ship at sea in a gale of wind ... the absence of rolling, the easiness of motion, the great comfort on board, and the handiness of steering, were such as I have never seen before in any other ship under similar circumstances of weather and sea".

However, the crew was alarmed by the thunder-like sound of the waves slamming against her flat bottom. Reed and Vogak wrote that at times it sounded as if the ship had hit a hard rock. Around 10 a.m. of the next day the hull cracked, the space between inner and outer bottoms was flooded, and Vogak rushed his ship to a safe anchorage in Ferrol. The divers discovered a five-meter-long dent and numerous cracks in the fore segment of the hull which were ultimately blamed on waves. Six of her 106 watertight compartments were flooded. Popov concurred and admitted his failure "to foresee the effects of shallow draft". He wrote that the damage had dual mechanism: first, when the flat pontoon pitched above the waves, gravity subjected it to an enormous stress, bending the whole structure down. Next, as it plummeted down, the flat bottom hit water head-on, rupturing the rivets and tearing off the crossbeams. Reed noted that the radial framing pattern chosen by the designers resulted in a strong center section and inadequately weak extremities, and that any experienced shipbuilder should have discovered this weakness in advance.

The Livadia could have been quickly repaired in a drydock, but none of world's docks was wide enough for her. The new drydock in Nikolaev, designed by Clark Stanfield specifically for the battleship Novgorod and the other popovkas, had not yet been expanded to fit the Livadia. Moored in Ferrol, Spain, for seven months, she became an easy prey for the journalists. The New York Times ridiculed the Livadia, her designers and her crowned patron: instead of blowing up the Livadia, the "nihilists" designed her, for it was hardly possible to conceive a worse ship. According to the anonymous satirist she was "a yacht on board of which seasickness would be wholly unnecessary", "a Nihilist device that no Nihilist would dream of destroying." Instead of hunting terrorists, "the English and Russian Police should seize the designer of the Livadia and hang him on the spot." In November the newspaper changed its attitude, this time praising the Livadia for her stability on the high seas; the speed attained by "an enormous iron turtle" impressed the reporter who suggested that the Livadia "may possibly lead to considerable changes in the art of ship-building."

According to the New York Times, on 10 December the Russians dispatched 83 men to assist repairs on the Livadia while still entertaining plans to build a 12,000-ton Livadia-style armed ironclad. Repairs proceeded slowly, and the Livadia left Ferrol only on 7 May 1881 [O.S. 26 April]. The Livadia, captained by Vice Admiral Ivan Shestakov, proceeded with utmost caution, evading rough waves at all costs. She passed the Bosphorus on 7 June 1881 [O.S. 26 May]. and reached Sebastopol on the next day. She made 3,890 miles in 381 hours, consuming more than 2,900 tons of coal. Shestakov reported easy steering, perfect stability and good build quality of the Livadia but advised against using her as a royal yacht until further tests could attest to her safety for Black Sea operations.

== Abandonment ==
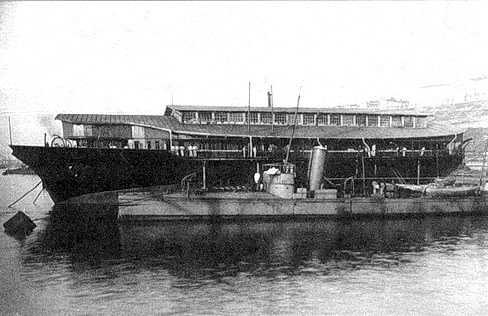
Hulked Opyt, former Livadia. The torpedo boat in front of it, 460-ton Kazarsky, was built in 1890.

On 13 March 1881 [O.S. 1 March] the Russian Empire was shaken by the murder of Alexander II. His successor, Alexander III, was facing continuing terrorist threat, civil unrest, pogroms of the Jews and other problems of far greater importance than Popov's yacht. Popov fell out of favor: Alexander III had no faith in old Navy brass and delegated naval matters to his younger brother Grand Duke Alexey. He publicly chided Popov's extravagant and wasteful experiments. The indifference of the tsar and the rise of Alexey doomed the Livadia.

On 10 June 1881 [O.S. 29 May] the Livadia sailed for her first and last voyage across the Black Sea. She raised the ensign of the Commander of the Black Sea Fleet, picked up Grand Dukes Constantine and Mikhail in Yalta and carried them to Batumi and back. The sea was choppy, making the Romanovs concerned about waves slamming against the bottom of the vessel and shaking the superstructure.

Later in June the Livadia was raised in dry dock. The inspection found her structure to be weak and recommended proper reinforcement of the hull. The Department of the Navy at first agreed, but then issued a countermanding order subjecting the Livadia to speed trials before any major repairs. In August 1881 she made 136 speed runs and barely reached 14.46 knots and 9,837 horsepower. The failure to make 15 knots sparked allegations of fraud against Popov and his Scottish contractor, but was ultimately explained by the incompetence of the crew and low quality of local coal. 27 August 1881 [O.S. 15 August] the Livadia was sent to an anchorage in Nikolaev where she was stripped of all the luxuries. Her retirement had not been formally announced, and the Russian press cautiously called her "the former yacht".

Popov's attempts to save the Livadia were cut short by Shestakov's report that the Tsar was determined to get rid of the Livadia. Alexander agreed to convert her into a floating jail, ruling out any seagoing in the future. Popov was again accused of fraud and embezzlement and struggled with imperial prosecution for four years.

In April 1883 the Livadia was renamed Opyt (Russian: Опыт, Experiment or Test) and left to rot while the Navy discussed her fate. Plans to convert her into a troopship were discarded, and by the end of the decade her engines had been removed and installed in Minin, General Admiral and Duke of Edinburgh. The hulk was used as a floating barracks and a warehouse. In 1913 Opyt was recommissioned for port duties; she was finally struck off the Soviet Navy register in 1926. According to Andrienko, she was still afloat in late 1930s.

Experience of the Livadia attracted shipbuilders' interest in the beginning of the 20th century, when the risk of torpedo attack forced the navies to reconsider ship protection technique and employ submerged anti-torpedo bulges.

== See also ==
- Russian yacht Livadia (1873)
