= Russian monitor Vitse-admiral Popov =

Imperial Russian Navy's monitor

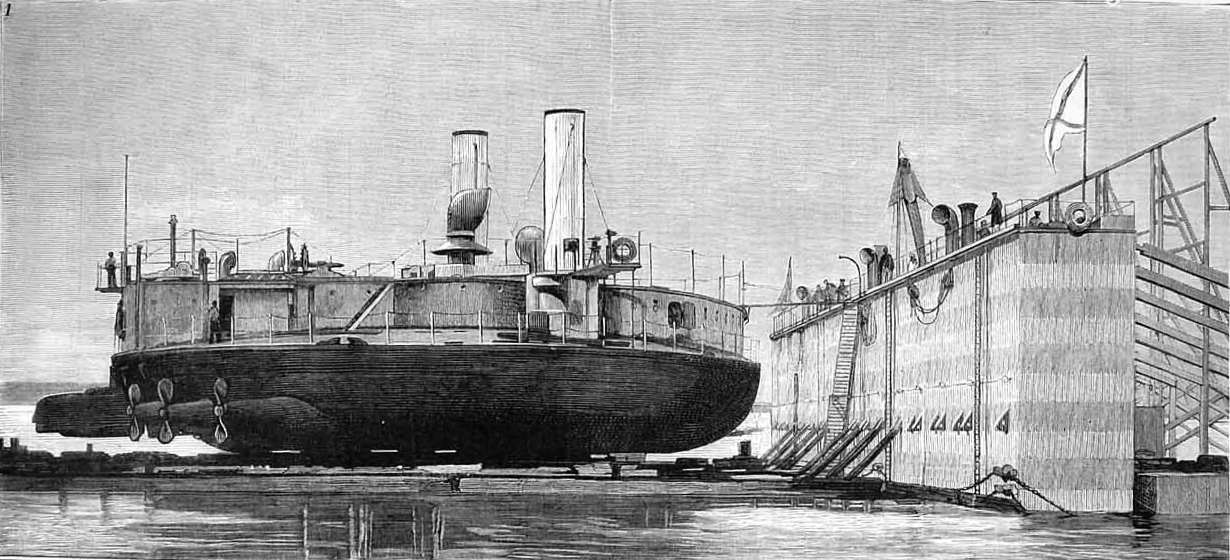
- Sketch of Vitse-admiral Popov in The Graphic, 30 November 1878

Class overview
- Preceded by: Novgorod
- Built: 1872–1876
- In service: 1876–1903
- Completed: 1
- Scrapped: 1

History

Russian Empire
- Name: Vitse-admiral Popov
- Namesake: Vice Admiral Andrei Alexandrovich Popov
- Builder: Nikolaev Admiralty Shipyard, Nikolaev
- Cost: 3,260,000 rubles (excluding armament)
- Laid down: 8 September 1874 (Note: All dates used in this article are New Style)
- Launched: 7 October 1875
- Completed: 1876
- Decommissioned: 2 May 1903
- Reclassified: As a coast-defense ironclad, 13 February 1892
- Stricken: 3 July 1903
- Fate: Sold for scrap, December 1911

General characteristics (as built)
- Type: Monitor
- Displacement: 3,600 long tons (3,658 t)
- Length: 126 ft 10 in (38.7 m)
- Beam: 117 ft 8 in (35.9 m)
- Draft: 19 ft (5.8 m)
- Installed power: 4,480 ihp (3,340 kW); 12 cylindrical boilers
- Propulsion: 6 shafts, 8 compound-expansion steam engines
- Speed: 8.5 knots (15.7 km/h; 9.8 mph)
- Range: 540 nautical miles (1,000 km; 620 mi) at full speed
- Complement: 19 officers and 187 crewmen
- Armament: 2 × 12-inch (305 mm) rifled muzzle-loading guns; 4 × 4-pounder, 3.4-inch (86 mm) guns
- Armor: Belt: 16 in (406 mm); Barbette: 16 in (406 mm); Deck: 2.75 in (70 mm)

Vitse-admiral Popov was a monitor built for the Imperial Russian Navy in the 1870s. It was one of the most unusual warships ever constructed, and still survives in popular naval lore as one of the worst warships ever built. The hull was circular to reduce draught while allowing the ship to carry much more armour and a heavier armament than other ships of the same size. Vitse-admiral Popov played a minor role in the Russo-Turkish War of 1877–78 and was reclassified as a coast-defence ironclad in 1892. The ship was decommissioned in 1903 and sold for scrap in 1911.

== Background ==
In 1868, the Scottish shipbuilder John Elder published an article that advocated that widening the beam of a ship would reduce the area that needed to be protected and allow it to carry thicker armour and heavier, more powerful guns in comparison to a normal ship. In addition such a ship would have a shallower draught and that only a moderate increase in power would be required to match the speed of the normal ship. Sir Edward Reed, then Director of Naval Construction of the Royal Navy, agreed with Elder's conclusions. Rear-Admiral Andrei Alexandrovich Popov of the Imperial Russian Navy further broadened Elder's concept by broadening the ship so that it was actually circular and he made the design flat-bottomed, unlike Elder's convex hull, to minimise its draught.

Popov's design was intended to meet an 1869 requirement to defend the Dnieper-Bug Estuary and the Kerch Strait. The requirement was for very heavily armoured ships of 11-foot (3.4 m) draught and armed with 11-inch (279 mm) rifled guns, four of which should cost no more than four million rubles. The 2,100-long-ton (2,100 t) Charodeika-class monitor met all of the requirements except that their armament was not powerful enough, so General-Admiral Grand Duke Konstantin Nikolayevich selected Popov's circular design in late December 1869. A model was built with a circular hull and performed well during tests in the Baltic Sea at St. Petersburg in April 1870; when Tsar Alexander II received reports of the trials, he nicknamed the ship a "popovka", after the designer.

Popov's initial design proved to be too grandiose and had to be scaled down. On 24 October, the Tsar approved his design for a ship 96 feet (29.3 m) in diameter, armed with two 11-inch guns, and protected by 12 inches (305 mm) of armour. It was estimated to cost 1.94 million rubles per ship and the total cost of the programme, including improvements to the shipyards, would cost 8.5 million rubles. For further testing, the Kambala (Flounder), a circular ship 24 feet (7.3 m) in diameter, was built in 1871. Equipped with two engines of eight nominal horsepower each, her trials during that summer were considered a success.

Vitse-admiral Popov was begun as the second ship of the class, after Novgorod, but Popov took the opportunity, when construction of the ship was suspended shortly after it began, to massively enlarge the ship to accommodate larger, more powerful guns and heavier armour. The Tsar approved the new design on 25 August 1873 although construction did not resume immediately. He also renamed the ship from Kiev to Vitse-admiral Popov, after her designer, on 21 October.

== Description ==
Vitse-admiral Popov was not perfectly circular like the earlier ship; she had an overall length of 126 ft 10 in (38.7 m) and a beam of 117 ft 8 in (35.9 m). Her hull had a draught of 14 feet 9 inches (4.5 m), but her propellers stuck out well below the bottom of the hull to a depth of 19 feet (5.8 m). The ship displaced 3,600 long tons (3,700 t) nearly 50% more at full load than did Novgorod although her freeboard remained 18 inches (46 cm). Like the earlier ship the deck curved upwards to the gun barbette in the center, but the barbette was entirely enclosed by a large unarmoured superstructure that included accommodations for an admiral and his staff. She had a crew of 19 officers and 187 ratings. Her bluff hull form meant that she lost speed in heavy weather and, in some conditions, the ship could pitch enough to place her propellers out of the water. The biggest drawback to her hull shape was that it greatly reduced the rudder's ability to turn the ship by masking much of the flow of water; so much so that it took 40–45 minutes to make a full circle and the ship was almost unsteerable in a severe storm. The solution adopted was to use the engines for steering and leave the rudder fixed, even though this reduced the ship's speed. During a Force 7 storm, Vitse-admiral Popov's captain wrote that: "the vessel took on a lot of water through the hatches in front of the ventilators... The steering wheel was torn out of [one's] hands, and the vessel did not answer the helm; it was necessary to steer by means of the engines, and to make fast the rudder."

The ship had eight vertical compound-expansion steam engines built by the Baird Works, using steam provided by twelve cylindrical boilers. The two inboard shafts were each driven by two engines, while the remaining four engines each powered a single propeller shaft. The two inboard three-bladed propellers were 14 feet (4.3 m) in diameter and the others were four-bladed and only 10 feet 6 inches (3.2 m) in diameter. The engines produced a total of 4,480 indicated horsepower (3,340 kW) which gave her a speed of around 8.5 knots (15.7 km/h; 9.8 mph). Vitse-admiral Popov's propulsion machinery proved problematic throughout her life as a result of defective workmanship and poor-quality materials. Her blunt hull form was not conducive to efficient steaming and she proved to be a prodigious consumer of coal as her capacity of 250 long tons (250 t) only gave her range of 540 nautical miles (1,000 km; 620 mi) at full speed. The ship had ventilation problems throughout her career, despite the later addition of a ventilation engine from the ironclad Petr Veliky.

Vitse-admiral Popov was armed with two 20-calibre 12-inch (305 mm) rifled muzzle-loading guns. The guns fired 640-pound (290 kg) shells at a muzzle velocity of 1,470 feet per second (447 m/s). They were intended to use Moncrieff-type disappearing gun mounts that were elevated to fire and retracted below the top of the barbette to reload. The mounts were ordered from Britain, but tensions were at a high level in late 1876 and the Russians feared that the mounts would not be delivered on time. So scaled-up versions of the mounts used in Novgorod were built, although they proved not to be robust enough to handle the weight and recoil of the guns. Gunnery trials in October–November showed the weaknesses of the mounts and damaged the adjacent superstructure. Further trials were conducted in April 1877 and were deemed satisfactory by the navy, although naval personnel still considered the mounts too weak. Rear Admiral N. M. Chikhachev, commander of Odessa's naval defences during the Russo-Turkish War, reported that the guns could be fired at full power only "in case of extreme necessity". The British-built mounts were delivered in early 1878, but were not installed until late in the year. They were traversed by a pair of 40 ihp (30 kW) steam engines that also powered the hydraulic systems that controlled recoil and elevation. Gunnery trials conducted in November showed that the system worked smoothly, although reloading time was around 14 minutes per gun. For protection against torpedo boats, four 4-pounder 3.4-inch (86 mm) guns were mounted near the funnels. These guns fired a 12.7-pound (5.74 kg) shell at a muzzle velocity of 2,154 feet per second (656.5 m/s) to a range of 3,602 yards (3,294 m).

Popov nearly doubled the thickness of the armour on Vitse-admiral Popov compared to that on Novgorod. The design was complicated by the inability of the Izhorskiye Zavody ironworks to roll armour plates more than 9 inches (229 mm) thick, so Popov decided to build a "sandwich" of armour. The outer belt armour was separated by 9 inches of teak reinforced by interlocking channel irons from the inner armour layer, which was itself backed by another 9 inches of teak and channel irons. The upper strake of the outer armour was also 9 inches thick and the lower was 7 inches (178 mm) thick. The inner armour was also 7 inches thick, which gave a total thickness of 16 inches (406 mm) at the waterline and 14 inches (356 mm) below it. The armour of the ship's barbette was identical to that of the upper strake of the belt armour. The rounded deck was protected by a total of 2.75 inches (70 mm) of armour, made up of three layers of plates ranging in thickness from 0.75 to 1 inch (19 to 25 mm).

== Construction and career ==
Unlike the earlier popovka, Novgorod, Vitse-admiral Popov (that has originally name Kyiv) was built at the Nikolaev Admiralty Shipyard. Construction began in January 1872, but was halted in mid-1872 when all of her workers were transferred to expedite the completion of Novgorod. Popov had already received approval to change the horizontal engines to vertical ones in March 1872 and decided to improve the ship based on the trials of Novgorod during the delay. The redesign meant that some of the work already completed had to be dismantled during late 1873 before construction began again in early 1874. The nominal keel-laying ceremony was on 8 September and she was launched on 7 October 1875. Vitse-admiral Popov was completed and entered service in 1876.

During the Russo-Turkish War, she was assigned to the defense of Odessa and her armament was reinforced by a pair of four-pounder guns mounted on the bridge wings. At some point early in her career, Vitse-admiral Popov was fitted with a telescoping spar torpedo. Together with Novgorod, the ship made a cruise to the Romanian town of Sulina on the Danube in mid-1878. Testing before the war revealed that the larger inboard propellers were more effective than the smaller outboard ones and that there was insufficient steam produced to supply all the engines, but the war delayed plans to remove the outermost pair until 1878. This reduced her total power to 3,066 ihp (2,286 kW) and her speed by about one knot (1.9 km/h; 1.2 mph). After the war the ship received armoured covers for her engine room skylight and the central barbette hatch to protect against plunging fire. In 1883, Vitse-admiral Popov was reboilered and her old boilers were refurbished and transferred to Novgorod.

She was reclassified as a coast-defence ironclad on 13 February 1892 by which time her armament had been augmented by two 37-millimetre (1.5 in) quick-firing Hotchkiss five-barreled revolving cannon. These guns had a range of 3,038 yards (2,778 m) and a rate of fire of 32 rounds per minute. By the following year her hull and machinery were in poor condition. The ship was turned over to the Port Authority of Nikolaev for disposal on 2 May 1903 and stricken from the navy list on 4 July. Vitse-admiral Popov was offered for sale to Bulgaria in 1908, but the offer was not taken up. The ship was sold for scrap in December 1911.

== Myths and reality ==
In his book, The World's Worst Warships, naval historian Antony Preston characterised the popovkas like this:

But in other respects, they were a dismal failure. They were too slow to stem the current in the Dniepr, and proved very difficult to steer. In practice the discharge of even one gun caused them to turn out of control and even contra-rotating some of six propellers was unable to keep the ship on the correct heading. Nor could they cope with the rough weather which is frequently encountered in the Black Sea. They were prone to rapid rolling and pitching in anything more than a flat calm, and could not aim or load their guns under such circumstances.

The design of these ships was very controversial while they were being built in the 1870s, with many articles being published in the newspapers of the day by supporters and detractors, and later picked up by historians. One such account, published in 1875, claimed that Novgorod made an uncontrollable turn while on the Dniepr, while Reed, describing a time when the ship's engines on one side were reversed during a cruise in Sevastopol Bay, wrote: "The circular form is so extremely favourable to this kind of handiness that the Novgorod can easily be revolved on her centre at a speed which quickly makes one giddy. She can, nevertheless, be promptly brought to rest, and, if, needed have her rotary motion reversed." It would seem probable that the two reports quoted above were combined into the story as given by Fred T. Jane: "On a trial cruise, they (Novgorod and Vitse-admiral Popov) went up the Dniepr very nicely for some distance, till they turned to retire. Then the current caught them, and they were carried out to sea, whirled helplessly round and round, every soul on board helplessly incapacitated by vertigo." The other criticisms made by Preston have been discussed earlier and the opinion of naval historian Stephen McLaughlin is a reasonable assessment of these ships:

In the final analysis, the popovkas seem to have been relatively effective coast-defence vessels; certainly their combination of armament and armour could have only been carried by a conventional ship of much greater draught. Their faults – and they certainly had faults — were exaggerated by critics, both in Russia and abroad, and have left as a legacy stories of uncontrollable ships designed by incompetent men.

A detailed review of Russian circular ironclads has been made by Roffey in 1974 with photos and information available at that time ^{[18]}

== Footnotes ==
< 18 ^ Roffey, pp 218-239 />

== Bibliography ==
- McLaughlin, Stephen (2014). "Russia's Circular Ironclads: The Popovkas". In Jordan, John (ed.). Warship 2015. London: Conway. pp. 110–126. ISBN 978-1-84486-276-4.
- Preston, Antony (2002). The World's Worst Warships. London: Conway Maritime Press. ISBN 0-85177-754-6.
- Silverstone, Paul H. (1984). Directory of the World's Capital Ships. New York: Hippocrene Books. ISBN 0-88254-979-0.
- Roffey, Clifford George(1974) "The Popoffkas" in Warship International, Vol 11, No 3, pages 218–239, Publisher International Naval Research Organization, ISSN 0043-0374
