= Russian monitor Novgorod =

Monitor built for the Imperial Russian Navy in the 1870s

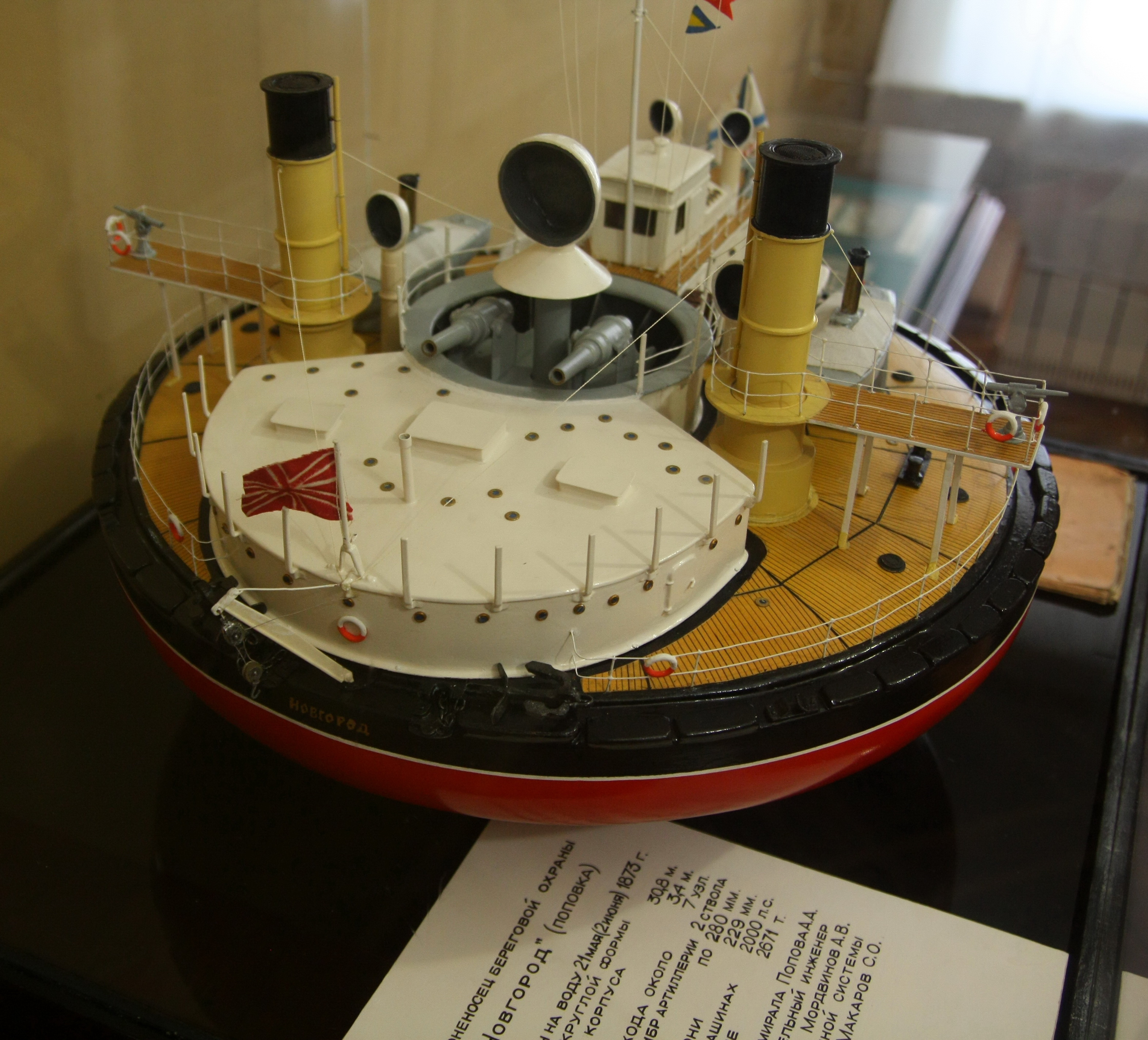
- A scale model of Novgorod as she appeared after 1875

Class overview
- Preceded by: Petr Veliky
- Succeeded by: Vitse-admiral Popov
- Built: 1871–1874
- In service: 1874–1903
- Completed: 1
- Scrapped: 1

History

Russian Empire
- Name: Novgorod
- Namesake: Novgorod
- Builder: New Admiralty Shipyard, Saint Petersburg
- Laid down: 29 December 1871 (Note: All dates used in this article are New Style)
- Launched: 2 June 1873
- Completed: 1874
- Decommissioned: 1 May 1903
- Reclassified: As a coast-defense ironclad, 13 February 1892
- Stricken: 3 July 1903
- Fate: Sold for scrap, December 1911

General characteristics (as built)
- Type: Monitor
- Displacement: 2,491 long tons (2,531 t)
- Length: 101 ft (30.8 m)
- Beam: 101 ft (30.8 m)
- Draught: 13 ft 6 in (4.1 m)
- Installed power: 3,360 ihp (2,510 kW); 8 cylindrical boilers
- Propulsion: 6 shafts, 6 compound-expansion steam engines
- Speed: 6.5 knots (12.0 km/h; 7.5 mph)
- Range: 480 nautical miles (890 km; 550 mi) at 6.5 knots
- Complement: 151 officers and crewmen
- Armament: 2 × 28 cm (11-in) rifled muzzle-loading guns
- Armour: Belt: 7–9 in (178–229 mm); Barbette: 7–9 in (178–229 mm); Deck: 2.75 in (70 mm)

Novgorod (Russian: Новгород) was a monitor built for the Imperial Russian Navy in the 1870s. She was one of the most unusual warships ever constructed, and still survives in popular naval myth as one of the worst warships ever built. However, a more balanced assessment shows that she was relatively effective in her designed role as a coast-defence ship. The hull was circular to reduce draught while allowing the ship to carry much more armour and a heavier armament than other ships of the same size. Novgorod played a minor role in the Russo-Turkish War of 1877–1878 and was reclassified as a coast-defence ironclad in 1892. The ship was decommissioned in 1903 and used as a storeship until she was sold for scrap in 1911.

== Background ==
In 1868, the Scottish shipbuilder John Elder published an article that advocated that widening the beam of a ship would reduce the area that needed to be protected and allow it to carry thicker armour and heavier, more powerful guns in comparison to a ship with a narrower beam, as was the typical practice of the day. In addition such a ship would have a shallower draught and only a moderate increase in power would be required to match the speed of a normal ship. Sir Edward Reed, then Director of Naval Construction of the Royal Navy, agreed with Elder's conclusions. Rear-Admiral Andrei Alexandrovich Popov of the Imperial Russian Navy further expanded on Elder's concept by broadening the ship so that it was actually circular and he made the design flat-bottomed, unlike Elder's convex hull, to minimise its draught.

Popov designed Novgorod to meet an 1869 requirement to defend the Dnieper-Bug Estuary and the Kerch Strait. The requirement was for four very heavily armoured ships of 11-foot (3.4 m) draught and armed with 11-inch (279 mm) rifled guns, for which the total programme cost should not exceed four million rubles. The 2,100-long-ton (2,100 t) Charodeika-class monitor met all of the requirements except that their armament was not powerful enough, so General-Admiral Grand Duke Konstantin Nikolayevich selected Popov's circular design in late December 1869. A model was built with a circular hull and performed well during tests in the Baltic Sea at St. Petersburg in April 1870; when Tsar Alexander II received reports of the trials, he nicknamed the ship a "popovka", a diminutive form of the designer's name.

Popov submitted several designs to the General-Admiral who selected the largest of these for a ship that displaced 6,054 long tons (6,151 t), 151 feet (46.0 m) in diameter, and armed with four 11-inch guns on 7 June. This ironclad was estimated to cost 4.14 million rubles, more than the total cost of the entire programme, and Popov was forced to scale down his design. On 24 October, the Tsar approved his design for a ship 96 feet (29.3 m) in diameter, armed with two 11-inch guns, and protected by 12 inches (305 mm) of armour. It was estimated to cost 1.94 million roubles per ship and the total cost of the programme, including improvements to the shipyards, would cost 8.5 million rubles. For further testing, the Kambala (Flounder), a circular ship 24 feet (7.3 m) in diameter, was built in 1871. Equipped with two engines producing a total of 3,360 nominal horsepower, her trials during that summer were considered a success.

== Description ==
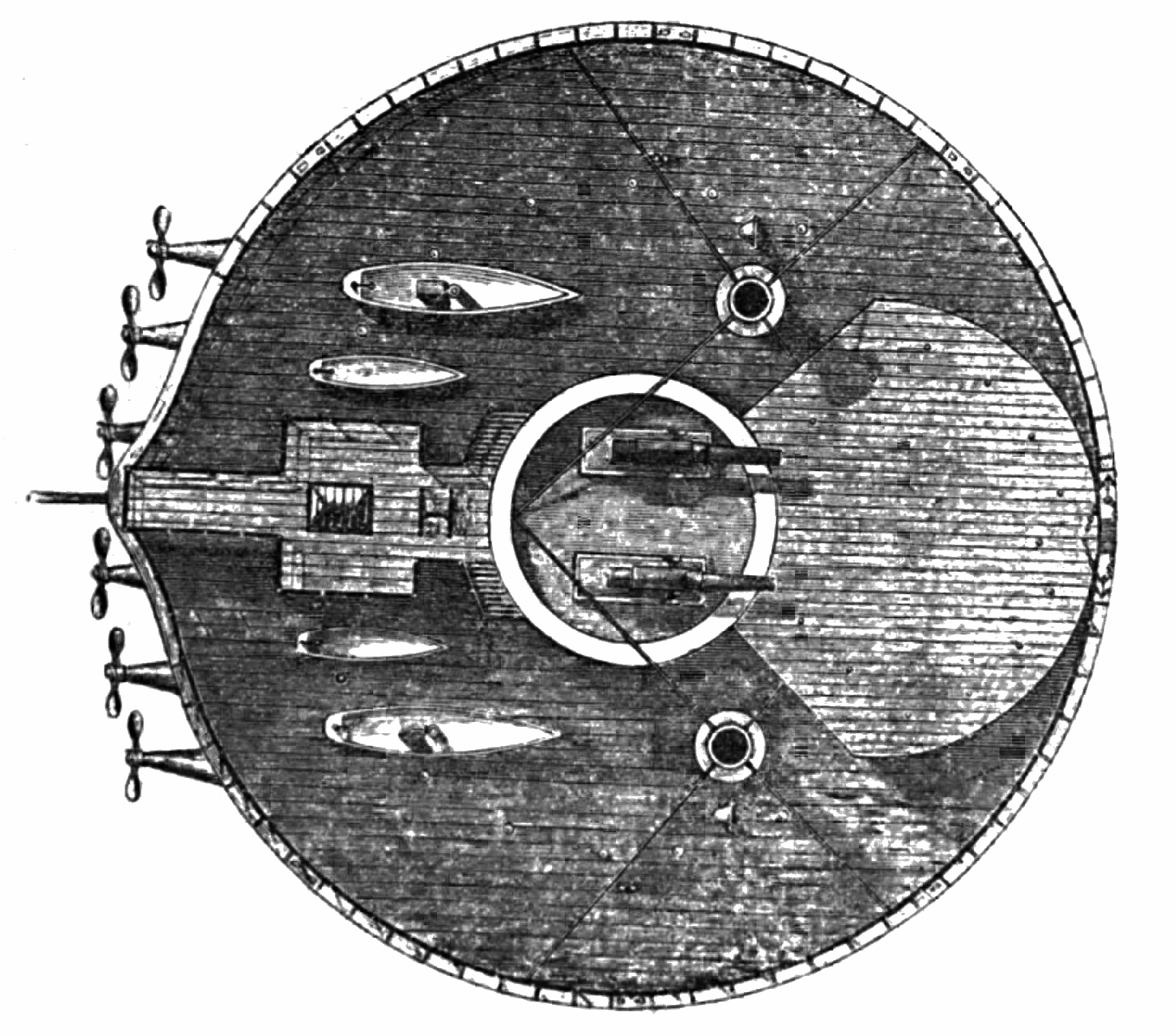
The deck plan of Novgorod

While under construction, Popov's design was modified by the addition of wood and copper sheathing to reduce biofouling, which increased Novgorod's diameter to 101 feet (30.8 m). She had a maximum draught of 13 feet 6 inches (4.1 m) and displaced 2,491 long tons (2,531 t) at normal load. Freeboard was only 18 inches (46 cm) and the deck curved upwards to the gun barbette in the center. The ship had an unarmoured superstructure forward of the barbette that housed some of the crew's quarters. Despite initial concerns about her sea-keeping ability, Novgorod was a stable gun platform and had an easy roll that rarely exceeded 7–8°. Her bluff hull form meant that she lost speed in heavy weather and, on one occasion in 1877, lost all headway during a Force 8 storm. In some conditions the ship could pitch enough to lift her propellers out of the water. The biggest drawback to her hull shape was that it greatly reduced the rudder's ability to turn the ship by masking much of the flow of water so much that it took 40–45 minutes to make a full circle and the ship was almost unsteerable in a severe storm. The solution adopted was to use the engines for steering and leave the rudder fixed, even though this reduced the ship's speed. She had a crew of 151 officers and ratings.

The ship had six horizontal compound-expansion steam engines built by the Baird Works, each driving a single propeller, using steam provided by eight cylindrical boilers. The engines produced a total of 3,360 indicated horsepower (2,510 kW) which gave her a speed of around 6.5 knots (12.0 km/h; 7.5 mph). Novgorod's propulsion machinery proved problematic throughout her life as a result of defective workmanship and poor-quality materials. Her blunt hull form was not conducive to efficient steaming and she proved to be a prodigious consumer of coal as her capacity of 200 long tons (200 t) only gave her range of 480 nautical miles (890 km; 550 mi) at full speed. The ship had ventilation problems throughout her career, despite later fitting a large ventilation cowl over the central hatch of the barbette.

Novgorod was armed with two 28 cm L/20 M67 guns. This was a 279 mm (11-inch) rifled muzzle-loading gun that was 20 calibres long. The guns could penetrate 11 inches of armour at a range of 800 yards (730 m); their 489-pound (222 kg) shells had a muzzle velocity of 1,290 feet per second (392 m/s). Their rate of fire was very slow, about one round every 10 minutes. The guns were mounted on separate revolving turntables that could be moved independently or locked together. Each turntable took about two or three minutes to rotate 180°. Gunnery trials in November 1874 showed that the locks for the turntables were too weak; so much so that the gun's recoil could cause them to rotate, leading to the persistent myth that the whole ship rotated when a gun fired. Reinforcement of the locks solved the problem, but the myth persisted.

=== Protection ===
The ship had a waterline belt of wrought iron that completely covered the hull and extended from 18 inches (457 mm) above the waterline to 4 feet 6 inches (1.4 m) below it. The armour was configured in two strakes, each 3 feet (0.9 m) high. The upper plates were 9 inches (229 mm) thick and the lower ones 7 inches (178 mm). The armour was backed by 9 inches of teak reinforced by interlocking channel irons. The navy considered this backing to be the equivalent of another 2 inches (51 mm) of armour. Novgorod was the first Russian ironclad to place her armament in a barbette mounting. It was 7 feet (2 m) high and was built in the same manner as the upper strake of the belt.

The rounded deck was protected by a total of 2.75 inches (70 mm) of armour, made up of three layers of plates ranging in thickness from 0.75 to 1 inch (19 to 25 mm). The lower portion of the funnels and the base of the engine room skylight had armour plates 6 inches (152 mm) thick.

== Construction and career ==
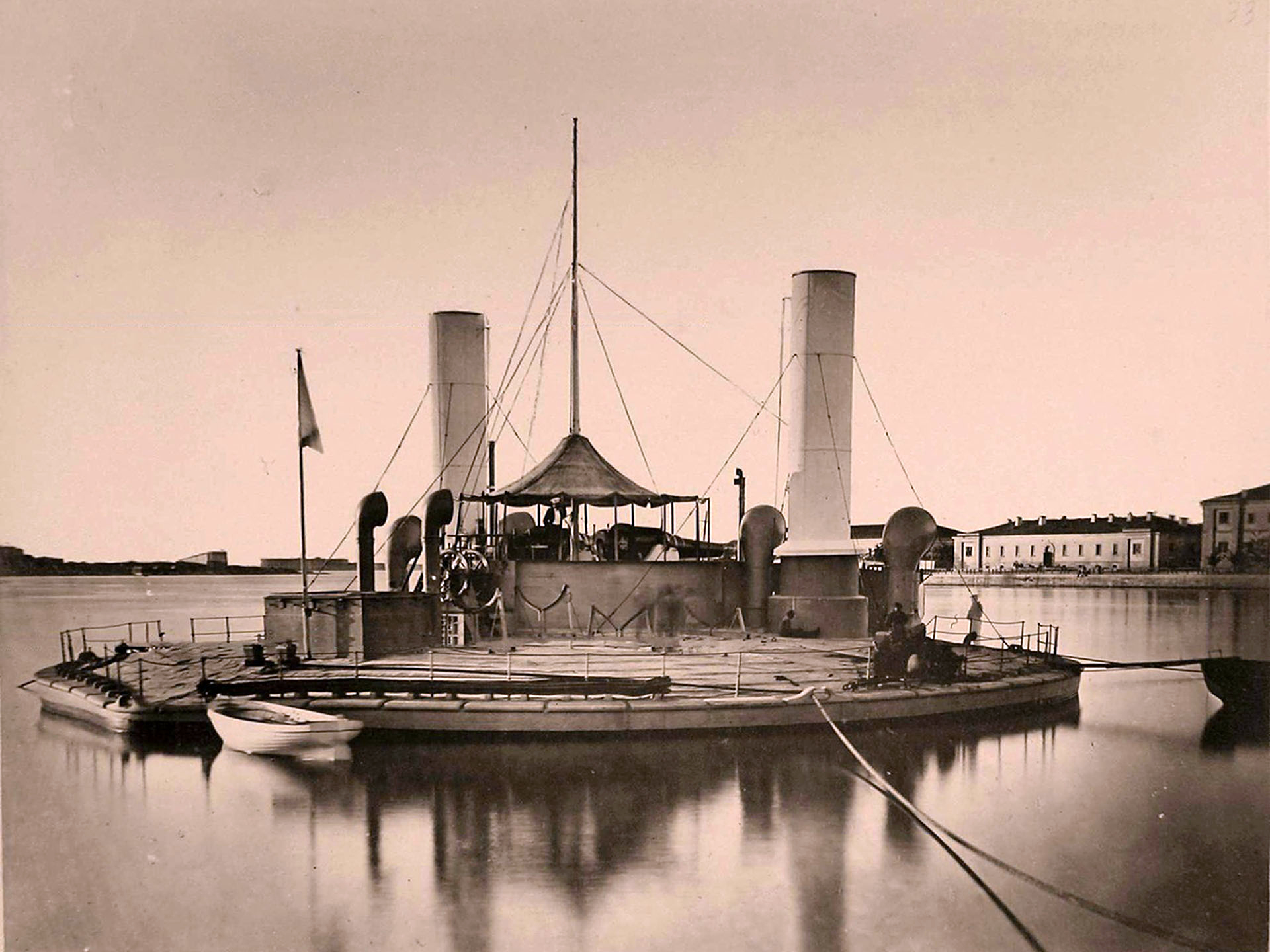
The original configuration of Novgorod, shortly after launch in 1873

The Treaty of Paris that ended the Crimean War of 1854–56 limited the Imperial Russian Navy to only six 800 long tons (810 t) corvettes in the Black Sea, so the royal shipyard in Sevastopol was leased to the Russian Steam Navigation and Trading Company. This meant that any ironclads built for Black Sea service would have to be built in Saint Petersburg, disassembled, and then shipped to a port there for reassembly. The long-dormant facility at Nikolaev was chosen and the navy began ordering machinery and tools from Britain to re-equip the shipyard in 1870, when Russia abrogated those clauses of the treaty.

A temporary slipway was built at the New Admiralty Shipyard in January 1871 and construction of Novgorod, named after the city, began on 13 April. Using two shifts to speed construction, her hull was completed by 29 December, when the official keel-laying ceremony was held. Within two weeks it was disassembled, and the first shipment of parts arrived at Nikolaev on 2 April 1872. Reassembly began on a specially-prepared slipway shortly afterwards. As there was no rail line between Saint Petersburg and Nikolaev, the components had to be railed to Odessa, where they were transshipped onto river barges and steamers. The boilers were too large and had to be shipped by freighter from the Baltic Sea to Odessa for transshipment. Construction was delayed by late deliveries of parts and the workforce's lack of experience; the ship was finally launched on 2 June 1873, with Grand Duke Konstantin Nikolayevich in attendance. Novgorod's guns were mounted three months later, and she entered service the following year, at a cost of 2,830,000 rubles.

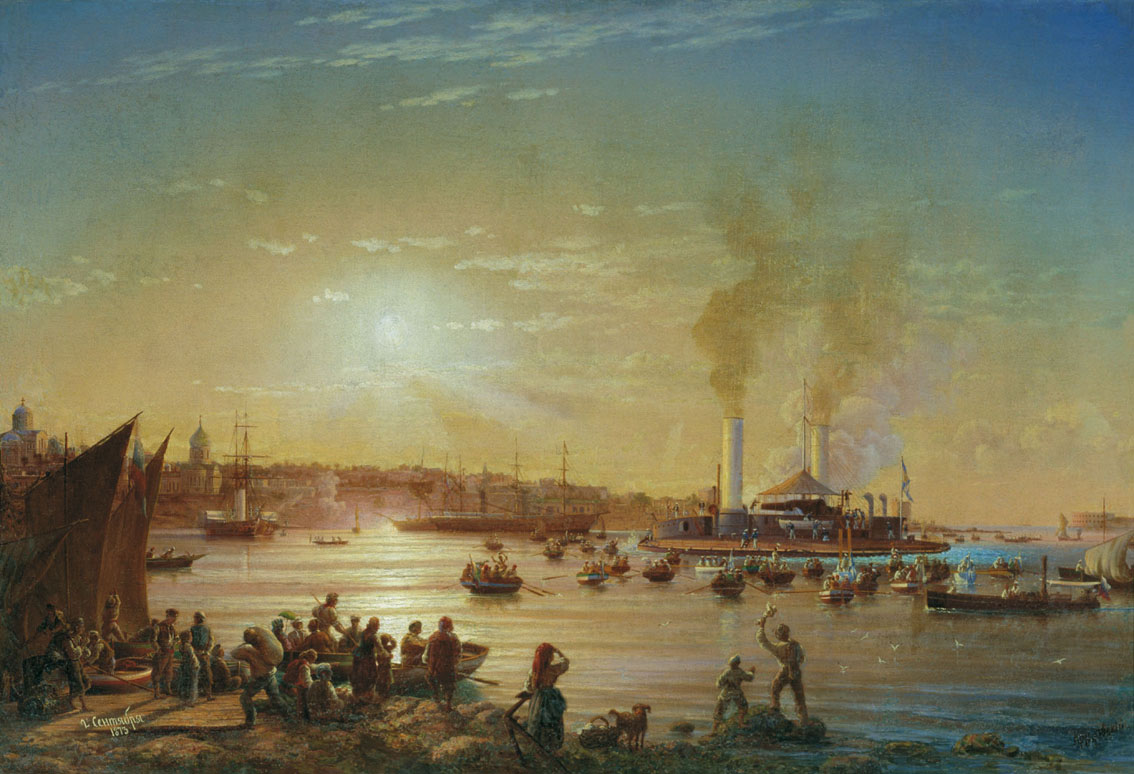
Novgorod's arrival in Sevastopol, 1873

During the winter of 1873–1874, a small superstructure was built aft of the barbette and an enclosed wheelhouse was built atop it. In addition, the shape of the forward superstructure was modified so that it overhung the bow, and prominent bridge wings were added. A telescoping boom for a spar torpedo was fitted at the same time. In 1875, the ship made a port visit to Taganrog, and hosted Sir Edward Reed during a cruise along the Crimean coast that October. During the Russo-Turkish War, she was assigned to the defense of Odessa, and her armament was reinforced by a pair of 4-pounder 3.4-inch (86 mm) guns mounted on her aft superstructure to protect her against torpedo boats. These guns fired a 12.7-pound (5.74 kg) shell at a muzzle velocity of 2,154 feet per second (657 m/s) to a range of 3,602 yards (3,294 m). During this time, the navy realized that the ship's outermost engines contributed little to her speed, and with steam capacity insufficient for all of her engines, the outer engines were removed in 1876–1877. This reduced Novgorod's total power to 2,000 ihp (1,500 kW) and her speed to about 6 knots (11 km/h; 6.9 mph).

The ship made a cruise to the Romanian town of Sulina on the Danube after the war, and she received armoured covers for her engine room skylight and the central barbette hatch to protect against plunging fire. In July 1879 she ran aground off Odessa and was damaged. Novgorod was stationed in Sevastopol throughout the 1880s and made short cruises every summer. She received the refurbished boilers from Vice Admiral Popov after that ship was reboilered in 1883. She was reclassified as a coast-defence ironclad on 13 February 1892, by which time her armament had been augmented by two 37-millimetre (1.5 in) quick-firing Hotchkiss five-barreled revolving cannon. These guns had a range of 3,038 yards (2,778 m) and a rate of fire of 32 rounds per minute. By the following year her hull and machinery were in poor condition. The ship was turned over to the Port Authority of Nikolaev for disposal on 1 May 1903 and stricken from the navy list on 3 July, after which she was used as a storeship. Novgorod was offered for sale to Bulgaria in 1908, but the offer was not taken up. The ship was sold for scrap in December 1911.

== Myths and reality ==
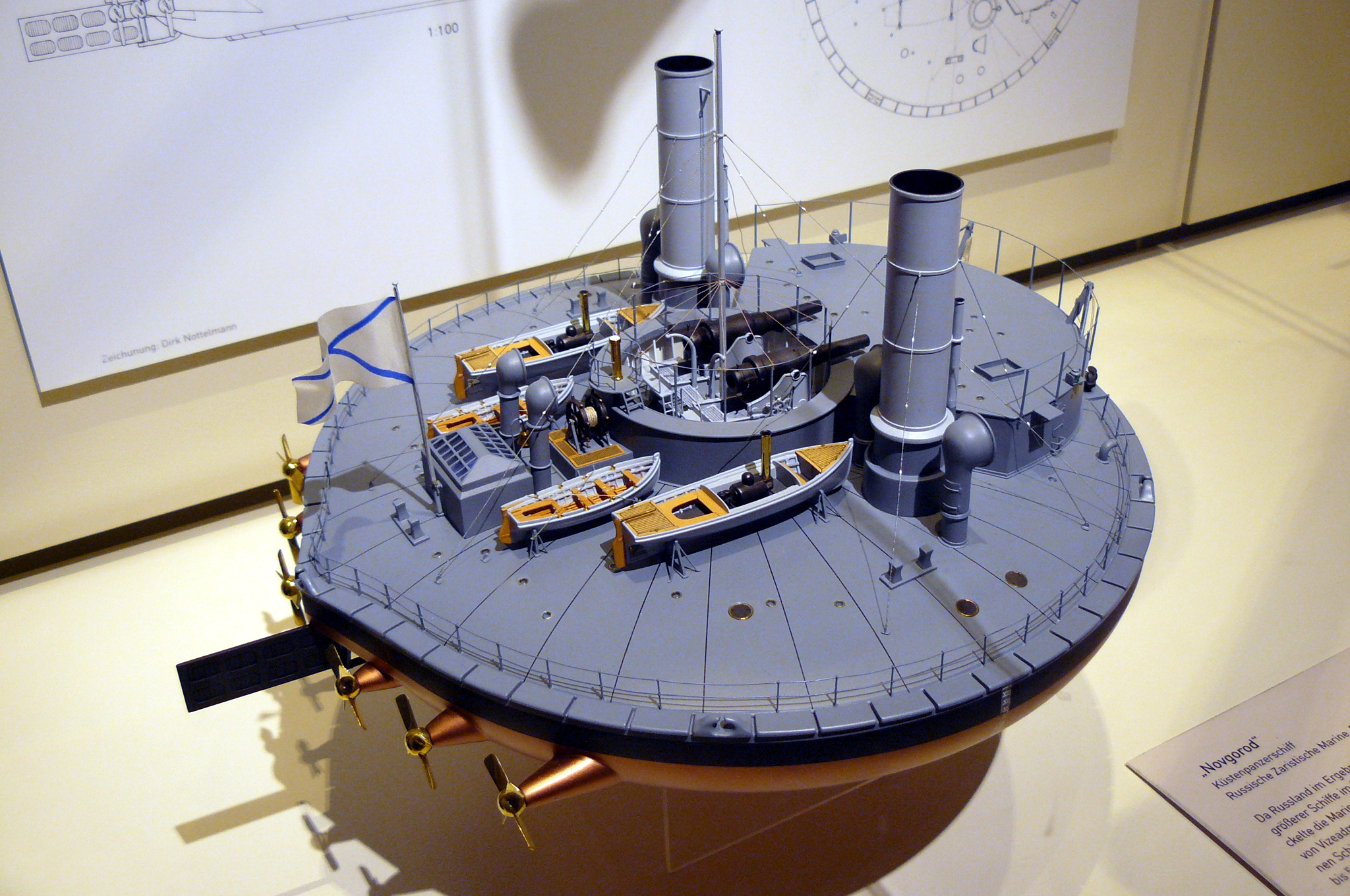
Model of Novgorod in her original configuration, held in the Internationales Maritimes Museum Hamburg

In his book, The World's Worst Warships, naval historian Antony Preston characterised the popovkas like this:

But in other respects, they were a dismal failure. They were too slow to stem the current in the Dniepr, and proved very difficult to steer. In practice the discharge of even one gun caused them to turn out of control and even contra-rotating some of six propellers was unable to keep the ship on the correct heading. Nor could they cope with the rough weather which is frequently encountered in the Black Sea. They were prone to rapid rolling and pitching in anything more than a flat calm, and could not aim or load their guns under such circumstances.

The design of these ships was very controversial while they were being built in the 1870s, with many articles being published in the newspapers of the day by supporters and detractors, and later picked up by historians. One such account, published in 1875, claimed that Novgorod made an uncontrollable turn while on the Dniepr, while Reed, describing a time when the ship's engines on one side were reversed during a cruise in Sevastopol Bay, wrote: "The circular form is so extremely favourable to this kind of handiness that the Novgorod can easily be revolved on her centre at a speed which quickly makes one giddy. She can, nevertheless, be promptly brought to rest, and, if, needed have her rotary motion reversed." It would seem probable that the two reports quoted above were combined into the story as given by Fred T. Jane: "On a trial cruise, they (Novgorod and Vitse-admiral Popov) went up the Dniepr very nicely for some distance, till they turned to retire. Then the current caught them, and they were carried out to sea, whirled helplessly round and round, every soul on board helplessly incapacitated by vertigo." The other criticisms made by Preston have been discussed earlier and the opinion of naval historian Stephen McLaughlin is a reasonable assessment of these ships:

In the final analysis, the popovkas seem to have been relatively effective coast-defence vessels; certainly their combination of armament and armour could have only been carried by a conventional ship of much greater draught. Their faults – and they certainly had faults – were exaggerated by critics, both in Russia and abroad, and have left as a legacy stories of uncontrollable ships designed by incompetent men.

== Bibliography ==
- McLaughlin, Stephen (2014). "Russia's Circular Ironclads: The Popovkas". In Jordan, John (ed.). Warship 2015. London: Conway. pp. 110–126. ISBN 978-1-84486-276-4.
- Silverstone, Paul H. (1984). Directory of the World's Capital Ships. New York: Hippocrene Books. ISBN 0-88254-979-0.
- Preston, Antony (2002). The World's Worst Warships. London: Conway Maritime Press. ISBN 0-85177-754-6.
- Roffey, Clifford George (1974). "The Popoffkas". In Warship International, Vol. 11, No. 3, pp. 218–239, ISSN 0043-0374
