= Andrei Alexandrovich Popov =

Russian admiral

- Андрей Александрович Попов
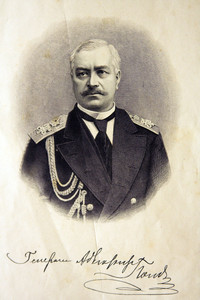
- Born: 21 September 1821; Russia
- Died: 6 March 1898 (aged 76); Russia
- Military career
- Allegiance: Russian Empire
- Branch: Imperial Russian Navy
- Rank: Admiral
- Commands: Meteor
- Conflicts: Crimean War

Andrei Alexandrovich Popov (Russian: Андрей Александрович Попов) (21 September 1821 - 6 March 1898) was an officer of the Imperial Russian Navy, who saw action during the Crimean War, and became a noted naval designer.

Popov trained for the navy, and commanded ships before and during the Crimean War. He rose to the rank of rear-admiral and was assigned to supervise warship design and construction. He was in command of a squadron in the Pacific during the Polish Crisis that followed the January Uprising in 1863, and was sent to North America on a goodwill mission, and in order to raid colonial possessions should war break out between Russia and other European powers. Though there was no war, Popov spent a year in San Francisco, where the Russian presence had a distinct impact on life. Popov turned to warship design after his return to Russia, and proposed a series of warships in an unconventional circular design. Only two were built, one of which, Vitse-admiral Popov, was named in honour of him. Their radical designs proved troublesome, and were not repeated.

== Early life ==
Popov was born in Russia on 21 September 1821, and attended the Naval School. He entered the navy after graduating, and rose to command the cruiser Meteor. He commanded a steamship during the Crimean War and was appointed Manager of Artillery Supplies at Sevastopol. When the war ended Popov was appointed to supervise the construction of steamships for the Russian Navy, a post he held for the next 30 years. The period saw a large expansion in naval construction, with Popov overseeing new Russian warships being built at St Petersburg, such as the 9,000-ton battleship Petr Velikyy.

== Pacific and San Francisco ==
Popov also served at sea, and by 1863 he commanded a squadron of Russian warships in the Pacific. The American Civil War was being fought at this time, and there were good relations between Russia and the Union. In turn the Union supported Russia in the January Uprising, and in July 1863 a squadron of seven warships under Rear-Admiral Stepan Lesovskii were ordered to sail from St Petersburg to New York, where they arrived on 24 September. Popov was also dispatched to America, and arrived in San Francisco in October with six ships, the corvettes Bogatyr, Kalavela, Rynda and Novik, and the clippers Abrek and Gaidamak. Popov had been in correspondence with the director of the Ministry of Navy, Nikolay Karlovich Krabbe, concerning the threat of war with other European powers over the Polish crisis. Popov had advised Krabbe that his squadron would be best positioned in San Francisco due to its good communication links, and would sail from there to raid British and French colonial possession in the event of war.

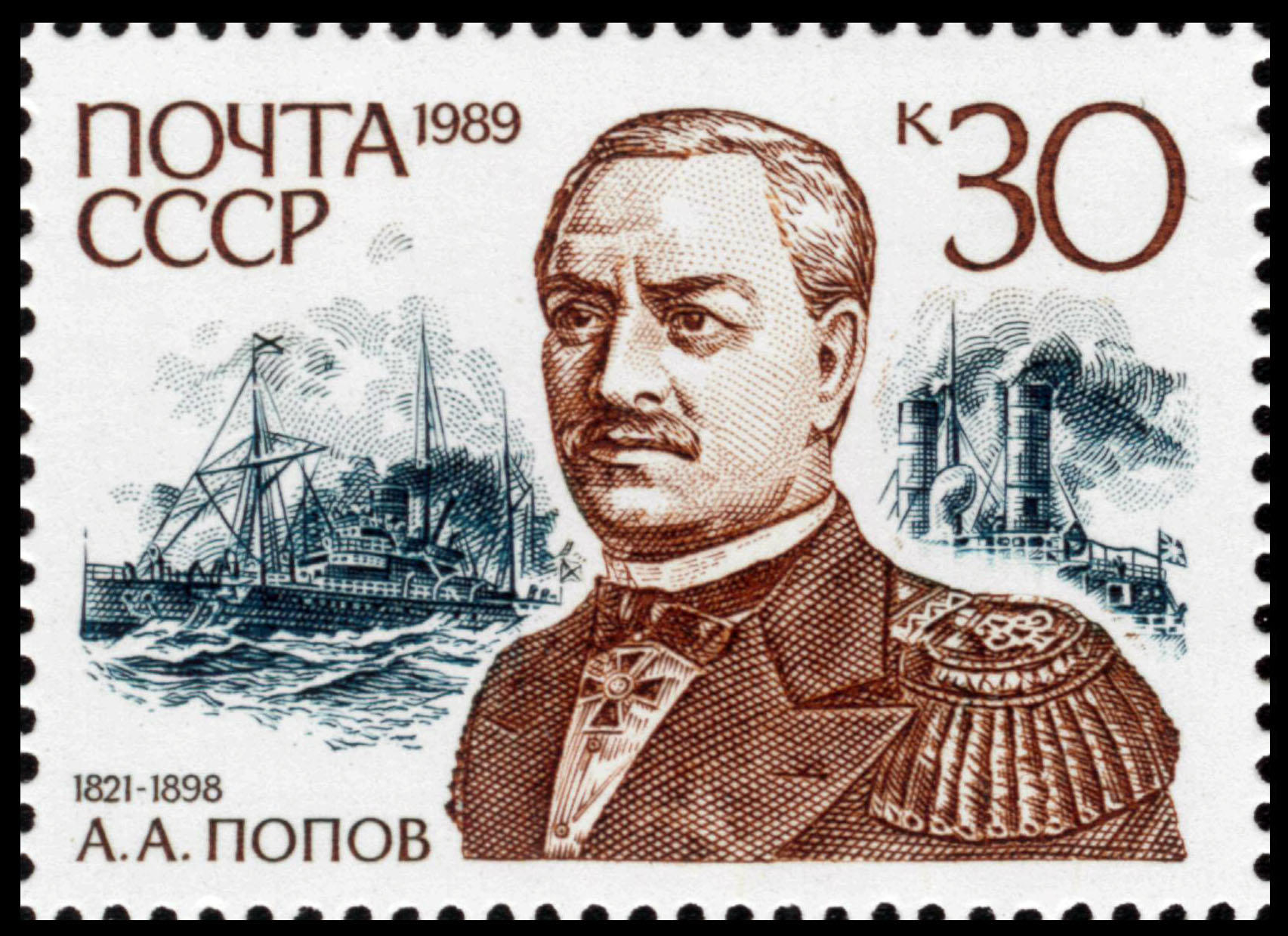
Popov featured on a 1989 Soviet commemorative stamp

War never came, though Popov remained at San Francisco until 1864, where he may have been influential in establishing the first permanent Eastern Orthodox parish in the city, and contributed furnishings and equipment to the Russian community in the city. During the Russian squadron's stay in the city, a fire broke out in the wharves, which 200 Russian sailors volunteered to help fight, with possibly six of them losing their lives in doing so. The city council unanimously adopted a resolution on 26 October 1863 thanking Popov and a number of his officers for their help in fighting the fire, and gold medals were awarded. Popov also declared in either late 1863 or early 1864 that he was prepared to defend the city were it attacked by Confederate forces. The declaration was greeted with enthusiasm by the city's population, though Eduard de Stoeckl, the Russian Minister, urged Popov to be cautious and not to aggravate the situation. Deterred by Popov's announcement, and the presence of the Russian squadron, Confederate raiders did not risk attacking the port.

== Unconventional designs ==
Russia had been banned from maintaining a battlefleet in the Black Sea after the end of the Crimean War. Fearful of further naval incursions, Russia wanted a fleet of heavily armed shallow-draught coastal defence vessels to guard the Kerch Straits and the mouth of the Dniepr River. Popov built a 24-foot steamer and carried out tests in 1870, subsequently proposing a fleet of ten large circular coastal defence vessels. Their circular design would create a stable gun platform suitable for operations in the shallow water of the Black Sea and the Sea of Azov, and they were armed with two 11-inch guns. The expense involved meant that only two were built, the Novgorod and the Kiev. The Kiev was renamed Vitse-admiral Popov in honour of her designer after being laid down. The unconventional designs received support from the British naval architect Sir Edward Reed, but failed to live up to expectations. Though heavily armoured, they were too slow to operate in the Dniepr, and were difficult to steer. Firing their guns caused the guns, which were mounted on their own separate turntables, to spin round due to a weak locking mechanism. This effect gave rise to a myth that the whole ship would spin around when the guns were fired, even though the guns were not powerful enough, and being placed in the center, had minimal leverage to do so. They could not cope with rough weather and were prone to rolling and pitching, which prevented the aiming and loading of the guns. Though they were judged failures, the circular hull design, tempered with a conventional bow and stern, was repeated in the design of the Russian imperial yacht Livadia with greater success. She proved to be comfortable and a good seakeeper. The two battleships and Livadia were christened 'Popovki', by Imperial decree.

Popov's involvement with warship design and construction led to him being made an honorary associate of the Royal Institution of Naval Architects, in London. He died in Russia on 6 March 1898.
