= San Francisco Fire of 1863 =

Fire in San Francisco at 1863

The San Francisco Fire of 1863 (October 23, 1863) was a significant fire incident in San Francisco, California, causing substantial damage and displacing numerous residents.

== History ==
The fire originated at 1:30 AM in the rag store owned by Charley Orley located between Sacramento and California streets, bounded by Davis and Drumm streets. The entire block, primarily consisting of wooden structures, was engulfed by the flames, except for two buildings on the southwest corner and a portion of another on the corner of Drumm street.

The San Francisco Fire Department promptly responded to the scene, and their heroic efforts were complemented by nearly 200 Russian sailors from the Russian fleet anchored in the harbor. Led by Lieutenants Seraggen, Eholen, and Mackaoff, the sailors worked collaboratively with the firefighters, using both buckets and fire engines to combat the blaze.

The fire caused extensive damage, resulting in the complete destruction of the block. Preliminary estimates indicated losses exceeding $100,000 (equivalent to $2.51 million in 2024), impacting businesses and individuals. Many residents lost their homes and possessions, leading to significant hardship.

Firefighters encountered challenges during the containment efforts. The absence of the wind from the west prevented the fire from reaching the city front, but low tide affected access to water sources, complicating the overall firefighting operation.

== Contributions of Russian sailors ==
The Russian sailors played a crucial role in assisting firefighting efforts. On the morning of October 23, 1863, when a large fire broke out, Admiral Popov ordered his squadron to aid the San Francisco fire service. Russian sailors displayed courage and valor in battling the fire. Despite initial use of buckets, they later transitioned to fire engines, working tirelessly alongside the San Francisco fire department. Their contributions were acknowledged by Chief Engineer Scannell and the Fire Department, expressing sincere gratitude.

We must not forget, however, to mention the noble spirit manifested by the Russian fleet now lying in the harbor, the commanding officers of which sent to the scene of conflagration nearly two hundred of their seamen... Each of these gallant "tars" (sailors) came with a bucket; but our good firemen urgently requested the sailors to throw aside their buckets and go to work on the engines. The Russian sailors responded with a good will, and continued until, like their competitors, they were, one by one, almost exhausted, when they took a few moments' rest and then again resumed their positions at the engines.

Many sailors suffered serious injuries, and six Russian sailors lost their lives in the struggle against the fire. The deceased sailors were buried at the Mare Island naval cemetery. The residents of San Francisco expressed gratitude by contributing funds to aid the wounded, and the City Council of San Francisco presented Admiral Popov with a letter of thanks.

== Legacy ==
The San Francisco Fire of 1863 left a lasting impact on the city's history. The collaborative efforts of firefighters and Russian sailors highlighted the importance of community resilience in the face of calamities. The event underscored the necessity for ongoing fire prevention measures and disaster preparedness in urban areas.

In 1994, commemorating the 130th anniversary of the sailors' sacrifice, the Russian Consulate in San Francisco organized a memorial service and erected new monuments at the graves of the fallen Russian sailors.

On May 9, 2010, a memorial plaque was installed in San Francisco at The Embarcadero near Pier 7. The project received support from the San Francisco Port Commission. The inscription on the plaque reads: "In memory of the selfless and courageous actions of the Russian Imperial Navy sailors while saving the lives of many city residents in suppressing the great fire in San Francisco on October 23, 1863."

The Mare Island Brewing Company released a beer named Six Buckets Russian Imperial Stout, honoring the six fallen sailors.

== See also ==
- List of town and city fires
