= Bruno Tideman =

Dutch naval engineer

Bruno Joannes Tideman
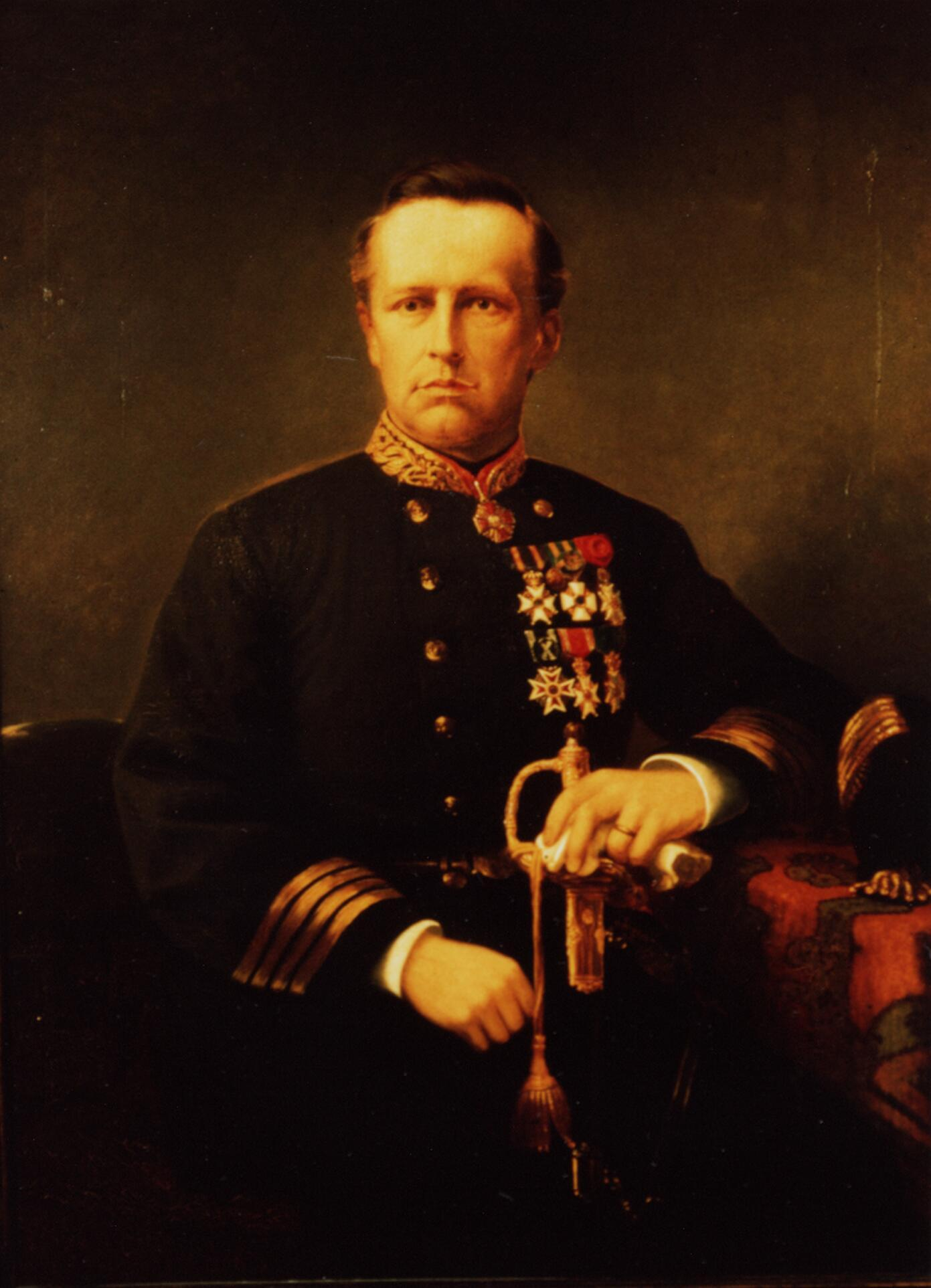
- Born: 1834
- Died: 11 February 1883 (aged 48–49)
- Military career
- Allegiance: Netherlands
- Branch: Royal Netherlands Navy
- Rank: Chief engineer

Bruno Joannes Tideman (1834-1883) was a naval engineer in the Netherlands, who acted as consultant to the ship building industry. In 1873, he designed a new type of engine that enabled ships to gain significant speed, which at the time was considered a revolutionary innovation.

On 11 February 1883, Tideman died at the age of 48 of a stomach ailment.

A descendant, also Bruno Tideman, founded a new boatbuilding company, Tideman Boats, in 2006. Tideman boats builds high-speed workboats out of HDPE.
