= Russian yacht Livadia (1873) =

Yacht, 1873

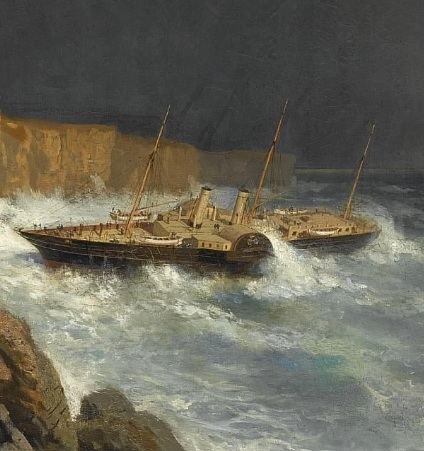
- The Wreck of the Livadia in 1878 (detail) by Alexey Bogolyubov.

History

Russian Empire
- Name: Livadia
- Namesake: Livadia Palace
- Owner: Imperial Russian Navy
- Ordered: 1869
- Laid down: 1869 (official ceremony: March 19, 1870)
- Launched: 1872
- Commissioned: 1873
- Fate: Ran aground October 21–22, 1878, sunk in December 1878

General characteristics
- Class & type: Powered yacht
- Displacement: 1965 tons
- Length: 81.2 m
- Beam: 10.9 m
- Propulsion: 1 steam engine with side paddles, 460 h.p.

Livadia was an imperial yacht of the House of Romanov built in 1869–1873 by Leopold Schwede in Nikolaev. She served on the Black Sea. The Livadia was the only Russian imperial yacht that has seen active combat service during the Russo-Turkish war of 1877–1878. October 21–22, 1878 she ran aground near Cape Tarkhan-Kut in Crimea and sank.

In 1860 General Admiral of Russian Imperial Navy Grand Duke Constantin converted Tigr, a three-masted paddle steamer built in 1855–1858, into a yacht for the Romanovs. The 62 meter long Tigr did not have the space and comforts expected by her distinguished patrons, and in 1868 the government discussed ordering her replacement in England. This proposal was discarded, and the job was awarded to captain Leopold Schwede of Nikolaev Admiralty. Work began in the end of 1869, although officially the Livadia was laid down only in March 1870.

Livadia, which displaced 1,965 tons, was smaller than her Baltic Sea counterpart Derzhava (launched 1871, 3114 tons) but matched her in size and comfort of the imperial suites designed by Ippolit Monighetti.

Livadia spent the summer of 1873 on the Black Sea, tending to the Romanovs on their short route from Sebastopol to Yalta. In March 1874 it left for a long training voyage of the Mediterranean and reportedly survived a force 11 storm. After the outbreak of the Russian-Turkish War of 1877-1878 it was converted into an armed auxiliary cruiser. On August 21, 1877 Livadia sank a Turkish schooner but was spotted by two Turkish ironclads and survived an 18-hour pursuit.

In the evening of October 21, 1878 Livadia left Sebastopol for Odessa. Some unknown urgency forced the captain to sail into the night in inclement weather. None of the Romanovs were on board. In the foggy morning of October 22, 1878 Livadia ran aground near the Tarkhankut Lighthouse, the western vortex of the Crimean peninsula (45°20′52″N 32°29′46″E). The crew safely reached the shore and salvaged most of the royal furnishings. Salvage of the ship itself failed, and 47 days after the accident the hull of Livadia was destroyed by waves.

In 1880 the name Livadia was given to an experimental yacht built for the Romanovs in Scotland.

Remains of Livadia are still visible in the shallow waters near the cape. For decades divers knew them simply as "that little steamer"; identity of the ship was confirmed in October 2008. Divers from Tula examined the wreck and reported that the wooden hull had completely disintegrated. Remains of the deck and copper lining were still identifiable; sensors showed presence of more metal in the sand.

== See also ==
- Russian yacht Livadia (1880)
