= 28 cm L/20 M67 =

1869 Russian breech loading naval gun

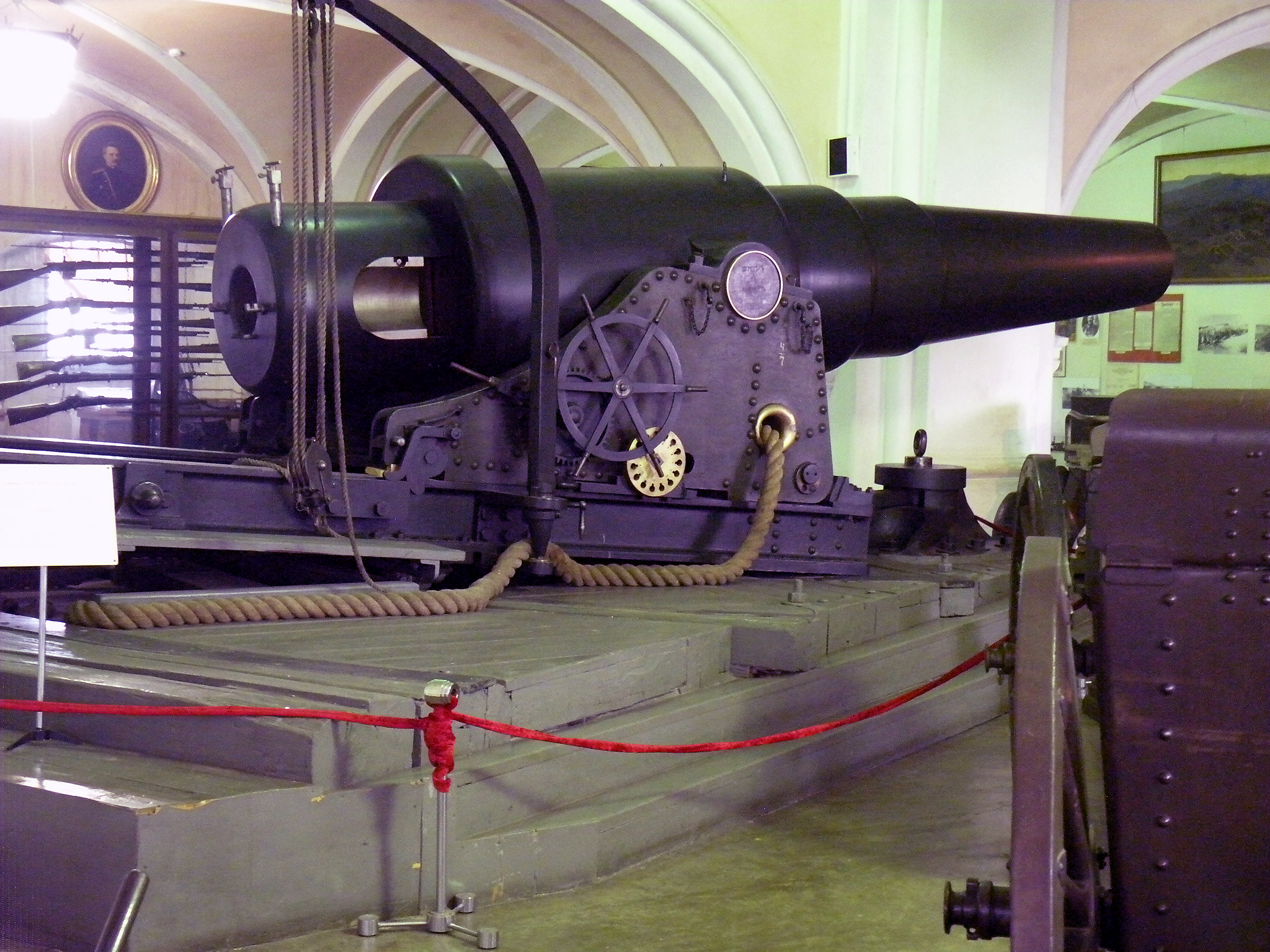
- A 28 cm L/20 in the Artillery Museum in St. Petersburg
- Type: Naval gun; Coastal artillery
- Place of origin: Kingdom of Prussia, Russia

Service history
- In service: 1869
- Used by: Russian Navy

Production history
- Designer: Krupp
- Manufacturer: Krupp

Specifications
- Mass: c. 25,500 kg
- Length: 5.588 m L/20
- Caliber: 279 mm
- Breech: horizontal sliding wedge
- Muzzle velocity: 415 m/s

The 28 cm L/20 M67 was a Russian early breech loading rifled built-up gun designed by Krupp. It was built for the Russian navy and coastal artillery by both Krupp and Obukhov. The gun was the predecessor of the Krupp 28 cm RK L/22 and the Obukhov 28 cm L/22 M77.

== Context ==
During the 1853-1856 Crimean War, Russia was forced to station a large army in the Baltic theatre, where a superior Anglo-French fleet threatened Saint Petersburg. Russia also suffered from a naval blockade that forced it to rely on overland communications to Prussia and Austria.

The 1862 Battle of Hampton Roads showed that the traditional type of gun, i.e. the smooth bore muzzle loader, did not suffice to destroy armored ships. This meant that armored ships would be able to destroy coastal cities with impunity. These developments prompted Russia to heavy investments in its navy and coastal defence.

== Ordering ==
=== Massive steel guns ===
The Krupp steelworks was one of the few companies capable of making crucible steel. It used this cast steel to make castings from which steel gun barrels were forged. In the 1860s, Krupp's ability to make the big high quality casts required for big guns was unique. From 1863 to 1867, the British firms Blakely, Whitworth and Armstrong even ordered the steel (inner) tubes of their guns at Krupp.

No wonder that Russia turned to Krupp to modernize its artillery. Already in 1863, it ordered 16 9-inch and 88 8-inch muzzle loading guns, as well as a lot of lighter guns. These were still cast in one piece, just like all Krupp guns were till 1866.

=== Ring Kanone ===
The appearance of ships with ever stronger armor belts, required explosive charges that the massive cast steel could not withstand. It made that Krupp switched to making built-up guns. This was also the time that Krupp introduced its cylindroprismatic horizontal sliding wedge breech, the Rundkeil Verschluss. The result was the so-called Ring Kanone. In 1866 Krupp made an 8-inch Ring Kanone. Later that year, Krupp got Russian orders for 8 and 9-inch Ring Kanone. The 8-inch had one ring, the 9-inch two rings. After testing, Russia ordered 62 9-inch guns in 1868.

== The 28 cm trial gun ==
=== A converted 11 inch muzzleloader ===
In 1864, Russia had ordered a single muzzle-loading 11-inch gun at Krupp. When Russia decided to exclusively use breechloaders, this 11-inch muzzleloader was in a forward state of manufacture, but it was nevertheless decided to change it to a breechloader. A trial gun was then made by using the 11-inch muzzle loader's inner tube, and by adapting it to breech-loading.

Some details are known about this trial gun. Length of bore was 160.2"; length of rifling 113"; 36 grooves; weight 25 ton 11 cwt or 26 tons, weight of shot 496 lb (550 Russian lb, 225 kg.), weight of charge 82.5 lb (91 Russian lb, 37.5 kg) of prismatic gunpowder. It was ignited through the breech. As a former muzzleloader, the gun lacked the length of bore of a gun that was designed as a breechloader. The final design would therefore have a length of bore that would be 2.5 calibers longer.

=== Trials at Krupp ===
In September 1868 the trial 11-inch Ring Kanone was tested near the Krupp factory in the presence of a commission of Russian officers. The gun was mounted on a covered proving carriage. It fired solid cast iron shot into an earth butt at a distance of about 62.5 feet. One objective of this test was to investigate the durability of the gun. After it fired the 400 shot required by the Russian government, it was still completely serviceable and had passed this test.

The other objective of this test was to see whether the gun would give the shot the required velocity. This was done with Captain Le Boulangé's chronograph, measuring at 18 and 50.9 feet from the muzzle. The measured velocity of the projectile with the 37.5 kg charge was 1,308 feet/s. I.e. above the required 1,300 feet/s. As the final gun would have a greater length of bore, this would theoretically attain a velocity of about 1360 feet/s.

For measuring the gas pressure in the gun when the charge exploded, the regular breech piece could be replaced with a special breech piece. This contained a Rodman gauge. The average atmospheric pressure was found to be 3,209 atmosphere, far below the maximum elasticity of the gun. After these tests were finished, the gun was sent to Russia for further tests.

=== Trial against armor belts in Russia ===
In August 1869, further experiments with the 11 inch trial were held near Saint Petersburg. The objective of these was to establish whether the trial gun, and thereby also the designed final form of the gun, would be able to destroy the most heavily armored ships of the time.

These trials were held at the Wolkow shooting range. The target was a mock up of the armor belt of the British ironclad HMS Hercules. This target had three wrought iron plates of 4.88 by 1.12 m. These were mounted above each other on a frame of teak beams. The two plates below were 9" thick, the one on top was 6" thick. Behind it was a 990 mm thick supporting layer of oak and other materials, like Hercules had. This made the 9" belt 1,219 mm thick in total.

The mock-up Hercules belt was probably chosen, because in a British test near Shoeburyness in 1865, the British 9-inch, 12-inch and 13-inch Woolwich guns had proven ineffective against this armor belt. The general results of 5 shots at the mock-up belt were that: Up to about 1,000 m, the new gun would penetrate the complete belt. At about 1,800 m, the shot would penetrate the 6" belt, but would get stuck in the supporting layer of the 9" belt.

== The 28 cm L/20 M67 ==
=== The final order at Krupp ===
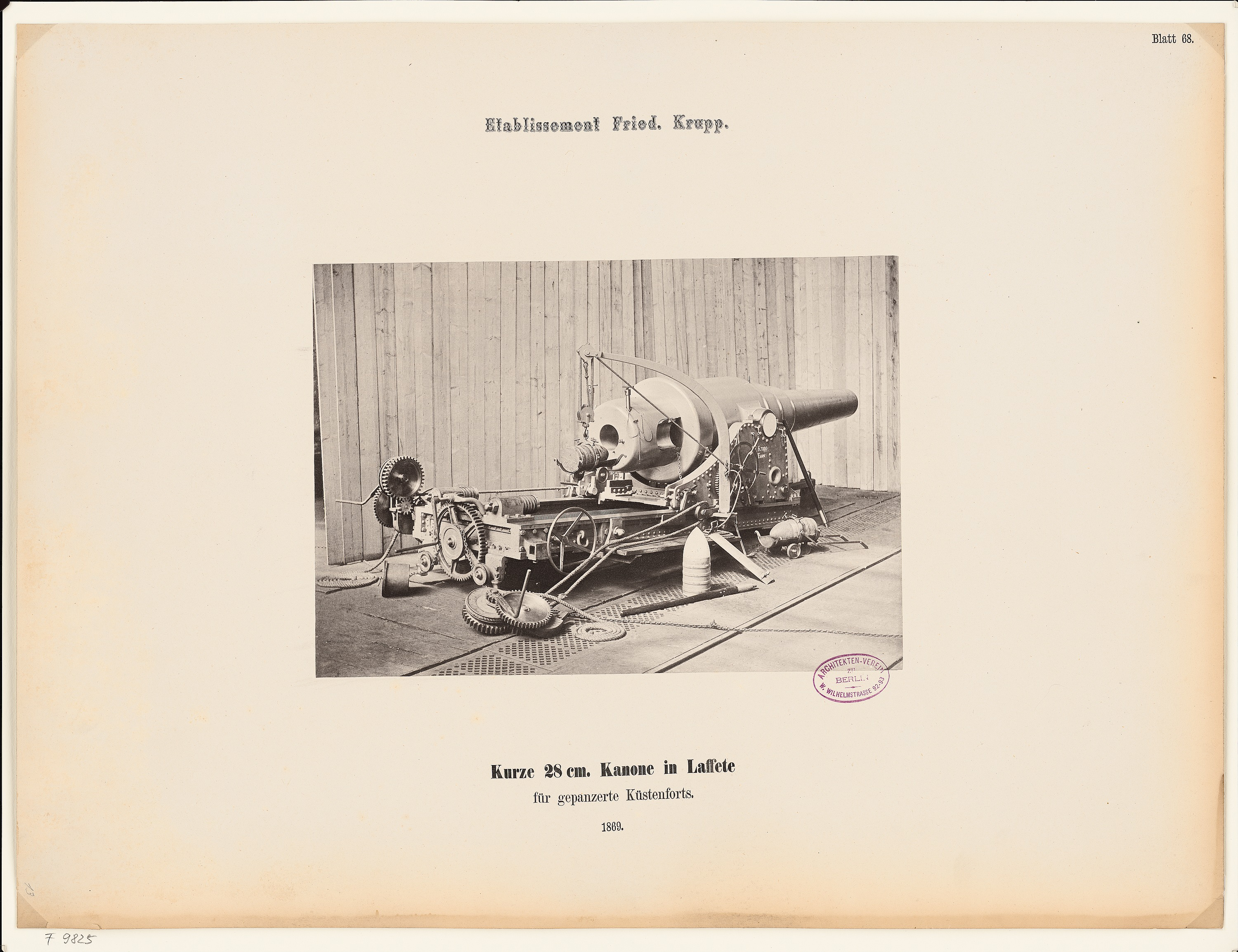
28 cm L/20 in 1869. As Saint Petersburg photo

In 1869, the Russian government ordered 76 28 cm L/20 M67 guns. The 67 points to the year 1867, which seems a bit strange, but obviously, the design had been made that year. At the time, the 28 cm L/20 M67 was claimed to be the mightiest gun in the world.

=== Characteristics ===
The characteristics of the 28 cm L/20 M67 were:

- Weight including breech piece: 25 tons, 11 cwt, 3qr, 3 lb
- No preponderance at the breech
- Length overall 18'4" (558.8 cm) L/20
- Length of bore 0.686 m longer than the trial gun.
- Rifling 36 grooves, 0.135" deep 0.64 to 0.76" wide. With of lands at chamber 0.17".
- Caliber 11 inch at the lands, 11.4 inch over the grooves
- Weight of steel shell 496 lb
- Charge 82 lb
- Initial velocity 1,360 feet/s 415 m/s

=== Carriage ===
The carriages for the 28 cm L/20 M67 were made in Saint Petersburg by the factory of the Englishman Mr. Baird. An American naval mission noted training ropes leading out of the carriage, see photo.

=== Domestic production ===
The same American naval mission that visited Mr. Baird's factory, also visited the Obukhov State Plant, referred to as Alexandrovsky steel works. It noted that for the production of an 11-inch gun, a 30-ton ingot with a diameter of 45 inches was required. The factory used a 50-ton steam hammer to forge the gun. At the time, an 11-inch gun had been made, and experiments with a 12-inch gun were underway.

== Use ==
At first, the 28 cm L/20 was introduced as coastal artillery.

On board ships, the 28 cm L/20 was used:

- To re-arm the Admiral Spiridov-class monitor.
