= Yuri Gulyayev =

Yuri Gulyayev may refer to:

- Yuri Gulyayev (singer) (1931–1986), Soviet opera singer
- Yuriy Hulyayev (born 1963), Ukrainian football player
- Yuri Gulyayev (physicist) (born 1935), Soviet and Russian physicist, director of Institute of Radio-engineering and Electronics
