= Erast Gulyaev =

Russian naval architect

Erast Evgenievich Goulaeff or Erast Evgenievich Gulyaev (1846–1919) was a naval architect in the Russian Empire, who designed the Russian imperial yacht Livadia, among other notable ships.
