= Derzhava (yacht) =

Royal yacht of the House of Romanov

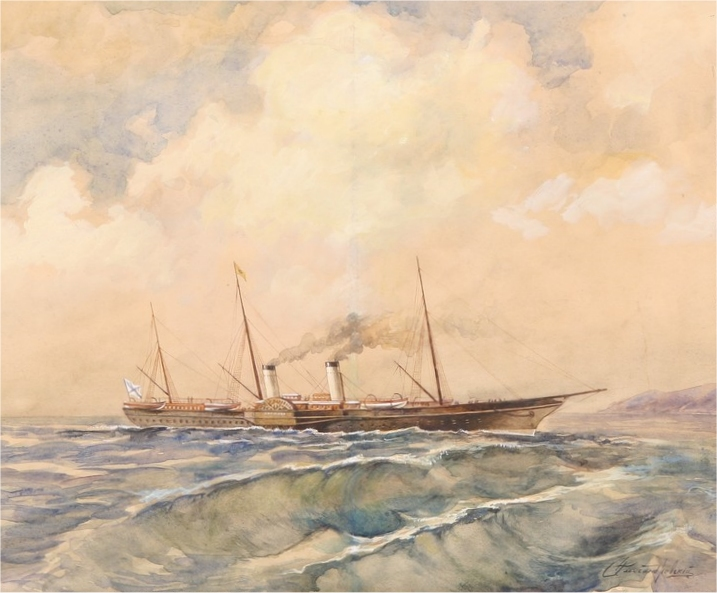

History

Russian Empire
- Name: Derzhava
- Owner: Imperial Russian Navy
- Ordered: 1866
- Builder: New Admiralty, Saint Petersburg
- Laid down: April 28, 1866
- Launched: July 31, 1871
- Commissioned: 1872
- Decommissioned: 1898 (renamed Dvina)
- Out of service: 1905 (as Dvina)

General characteristics
- Class & type: Powered yacht
- Displacement: 3114 tons
- Length: 94.8 m (311 ft)
- Propulsion: 2 steam engines; 720 h.p. combined
- Complement: 238 (1888 season)

The Derzhava (Russian: Держава, English translation: independent, self-sufficient nation-state) was a royal yacht of the House of Romanov. It was laid down in 1866 and launched in 1871. The Derzhava (Baltic Sea) and the Livadia (Black Sea) were the last wooden paddle steamers built for the Romanovs. The Derzhava served the Romanovs until 1898, when she was converted into a training ship and renamed Dvina.

== History ==
The Derzhava was laid down at the New Admiralty, Saint Petersburg by Alexander II of Russia. I. S. Dmitriev was appointed as master shipwright. The design of Derzhava was based on the British royal yacht HMY Victoria and Albert. She was launched five years later, in July 1871. Her two steam engines, of local design and make, were rated at 720 horsepower, and enabled a maximum speed of 16.72 knots.

The deck of the Derzhava had two raised penthouses: the Emperor's in the back and the General Admiral's in the fore. The interiors of the imperial suites, furniture and tableware were designed by Ippolit Monighetti. The contract for the figurehead was awarded to Mikhail Mikeshin. Originally, Mikeshin proposed installing a female allegory of Russia wielding armor and the orb, the abstraction of the concept of the ship's name, but in 1867 Alexander dismissed the proposal and instructed Mikeshin to shape the standard double-headed eagle. Mikeshin made it by July 1870, yet his sculpture was radically different from the ordinary omnipresent state eagles. On 11 May 1874, Derzhava ran aground at Vlissingen, Zeeland, Netherlands when leaving that port for Gravesend, Kent, United Kingdom. She was refloated on 13 May. Derzhava ran aground again in late June 1879. She was on a voyage from Cronstadt to Copenhagen. She was refloated two days later and resumed her voyage, arriving at Copenhagen on 29 June.

The Derzhava had a crew of no less than 200 men. In 1888 she employed 238 men: 93 mechanics and stokers, 65 musicians, 15 choir singers, and others, not including the royal retinue of at least fifty.

The Derzhava operated as a yacht until 1898. She was then converted into a training ship and re-christened Dvina. The Dvina was decommissioned in 1905.

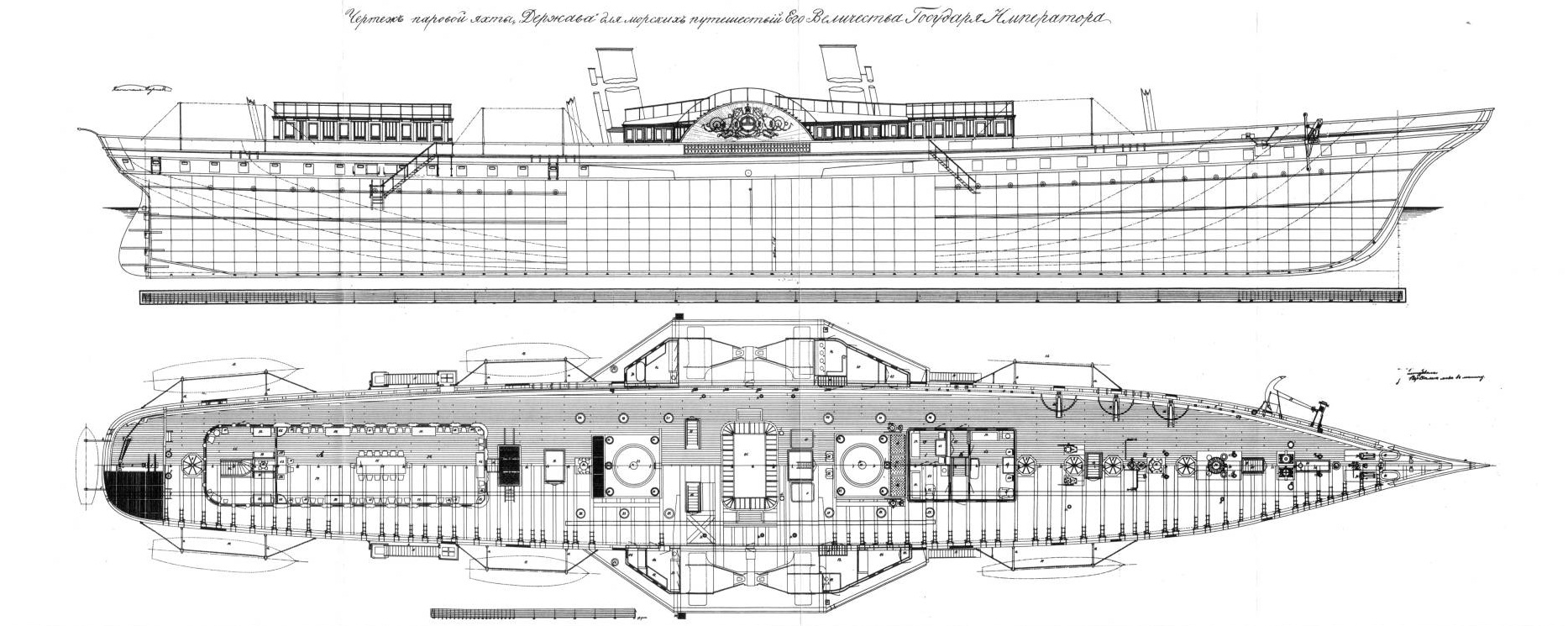
Shipbuilder's drawings, Russian Navy archive
