= Russian ironclad Petr Veliky =

Ironclad turret ship for the Imperial Russian Navy

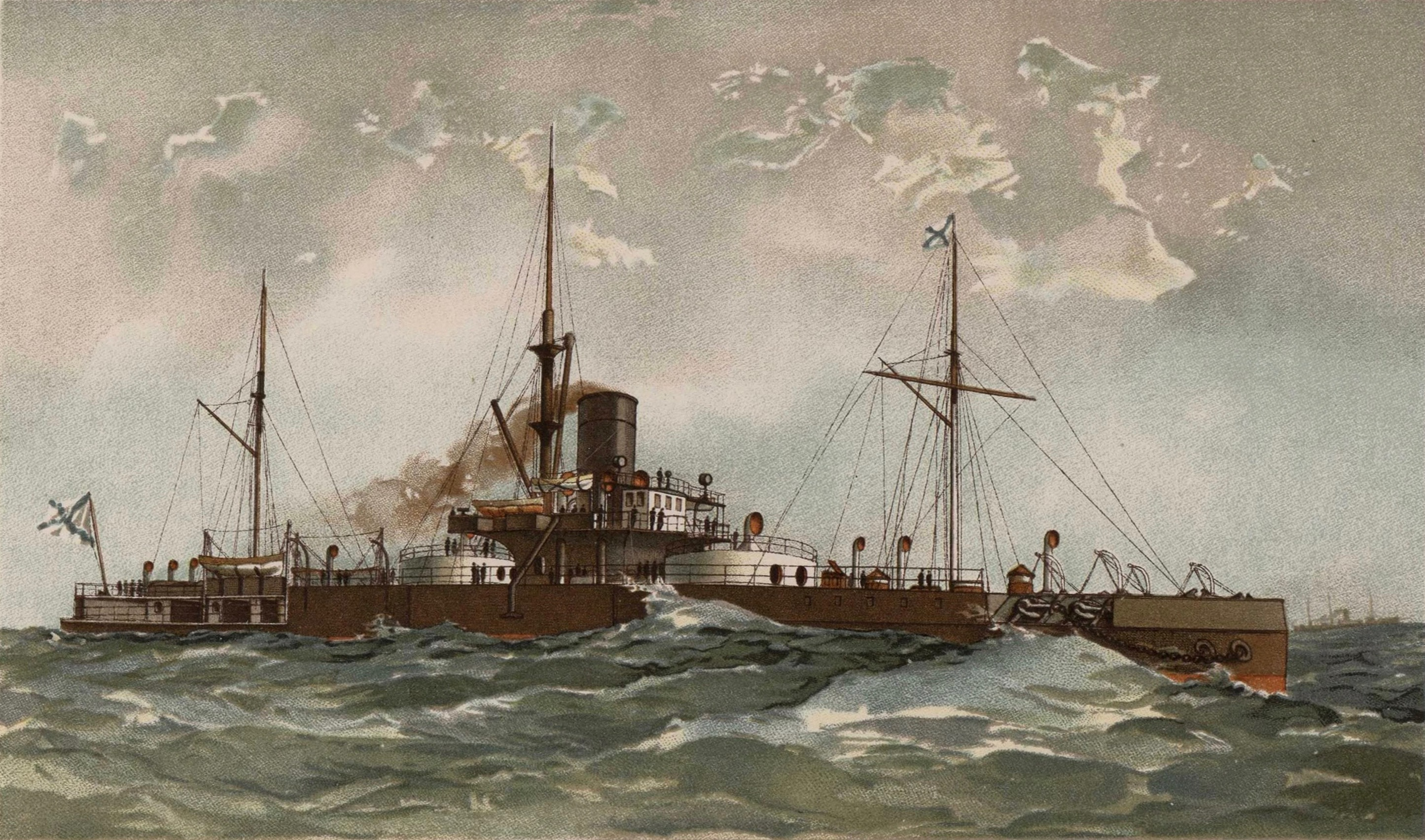
- An 1893 lithograph of Petr Veliky

History

Russian Empire
- Name: Petr Velikiy
- Namesake: Peter the Great
- Operator: Imperial Russian Navy
- Builder: Galerniy Island Shipyard, Saint Petersburg
- Cost: over 5.5 million rubles
- Laid down: 23 July 1870 (Note: All dates used in this article are New Style)
- Launched: 27 August 1872
- Decommissioned: 21 May 1921
- In service: 14 October 1876
- Renamed: Blokshiv Nr. 1, 4 December 1923; Blokshiv Nr. 4, 1 January 1932; BSh-3, 16 May 1949
- Reclassified: Training ship, 1908; Depot ship, 1917; Hulk, 1921
- Stricken: 18 April 1959
- Fate: Scrapped after April 1959

General characteristics (as built)
- Type: Turret ship
- Displacement: 10,406 long tons (10,573 t)
- Length: 333 ft 8 in (101.7 m)
- Beam: 63 ft (19.2 m)
- Draft: 24 ft 9 in (7.5 m) (designed)
- Installed power: 12 rectangular boilers; 8,258 ihp (6,158 kW)
- Propulsion: 2 shafts; 2 horizontal-return, connecting rod-steam engines
- Speed: about 13 knots (24 km/h; 15 mph)
- Range: 2,900 nautical miles (5,400 km; 3,300 mi) at 10 knots (19 km/h; 12 mph)
- Complement: 24 officers and 417 crewmen
- Armament: As built: 2 × twin 12-inch (305 mm) guns; 6 × single 4-pounder guns; 2 × single 4-pounder Gatling-type machine guns; 4 × spar torpedoes; After 1907 refit: 4 × single 203 mm (8 in) guns; 12 × single 152 mm (6 in) guns; 12 × single 75 mm (3 in) guns; 4 × single 57 mm (2.2 in) guns; 8 × single 47 mm (1.9 in) guns; 2 × single 37 mm (1.5 in) guns
- Armor: Belt: 8–14 in (203–356 mm); Citadel: 14 in (356 mm); Deck: 2.5–3 in (64–76 mm); Gun turrets: 14 in (356 mm)

Petr Velikiy (Russian: Пётр Великий – Peter the Great) was an ironclad turret ship built for the Imperial Russian Navy during the 1870s. Her engines and boilers were defective, but were not replaced until 1881. The ship made a cruise to the Mediterranean after they were installed, and before returning to the Baltic Fleet, where she remained for the rest of her career. She did not, like the rest of the Baltic Fleet, participate in the Russo-Turkish War of 1877–1878. Petr Veliky was deemed obsolete by the late 1890s, but she was not ordered to be converted into a gunnery training ship until 1903.

The Russo-Japanese War of 1904–1905 slowed her reconstruction, and the ship was not completed until 1908. She spent most of World War I as a training ship, although she became a depot ship for submarines in 1917. Petr Veliky was in Helsinki in March 1918 when the Treaty of Brest-Litovsk required the Soviets to evacuate their naval base at Helsinki or have their ships interned by newly independent Finland even though the Gulf of Finland was still frozen over. The ship reached Kronstadt in April 1918 and was hulked on 21 May 1921. She remained in service with the Soviets, in various secondary roles, until she was finally stricken from the Navy List in 1959 and subsequently scrapped.

== Design and description ==
Petr Veliky had its genesis in the visit of the American twin-turret monitor USS Miantonomoh to Kronstadt in August 1866, that inspired Rear Admiral A. A. Popov to submit a preliminary design for a low-freeboard, breastwork monitor with a full suite of sails and masts. He intended the ship to act as a hybrid monitor-cruiser, able to attack enemy shipping and threaten his ports. The design was approved by the Naval Technical Committee (Russian: Morskoi tekhnicheskii komitet), and a detailed design was prepared by September 1867. This was reviewed on 20 February 1868, and the coal supply was ordered to be raised from four to five days' steaming, which forced the design to be revised to accommodate the extra coal. This modified design was approved on 26 January 1869 by the Committee, but more changes were made even after that. In May Popov proposed to add a small superstructure forward of the breastwork to improve seakeeping and overhanging side armor as used on the monitors during the American Civil War. Both changes were approved on 19 June 1869 although the displacement of the ship had constantly increased from the 7,496 long tons (7,616 t) of the 1867 design to the 9,462 long tons (9,614 t) of the June 1869 design.

Construction of the ship, now named Kreiser (Cruiser), began even before the design was approved, but changes to the design continued to be made. The masts and rigging were deleted, presumably shortly after the loss of the British masted turret ship HMS Captain in a storm on 7 September 1870, although the exact date is not known. The decision between a ram and telescoping spar torpedoes in the ship's bow was not made until November 1870. The visit of the British naval architect Edward Reed in June 1871 prompted changes in the design of the breastwork. It was increased in thickness from 12 inches (305 mm) to 14 inches (356 mm) and extended to the sides of the ship in accordance with suggestions by Reed. Kreiser was renamed Petr Veliky on 11 June 1872, in honor of the bicentennial of Peter the Great's birth.

Petr Veliky was 329 feet 8 inches (100.5 m) long at the waterline and 333 feet 8 inches (101.7 m) long overall, with a beam of 63 feet 1 inch (19.2 m) and a designed draft of 24 feet 9 inches (7.5 m). Her displacement as completed was 10,406 long tons (10,573 t), almost 500 long tons (508 t) more than her designed displacement of 9,665 long tons (9,820 t).

The ship's hull was subdivided by one centerline longitudinal, nine transverse and two wing watertight bulkheads, and it had a complete double bottom. Petr Veliky had a high metacentric height of 8 feet 8 inches (2.64 m). Although a lively roller, she was considered a passable sea-boat even though water flooded in between the gap between the gun turrets and the deck whenever the sea swept over her forecastle.

=== Propulsion ===
Petr Veliky had two three-cylinder horizontal return connecting rod-steam engines, each driving a single propeller. Steam was provided by 12 rectangular boilers with a working pressure of 2.45 atm (248 kPa; 36 psi). The engines were designed to produce a total of 9,000 indicated horsepower (6,700 kW) to give the ship a maximum speed of around 13 knots (24 km/h; 15 mph). The ship carried a maximum of 1,213 long tons (1,232 t) of coal, which gave her an economical range of 2,900 nautical miles (5,400 km; 3,300 mi) at 10 knots (19 km/h; 12 mph).

The machinery was built by the Baird Works for the price of 1,019,000 rubles, but proved to be defective. Inferior metal was used in the boilers and multiple cracks and breaks were found in the piping. Cracks were also found in the engine cylinders that Baird had attempted to patch and then puttied over. Baird was forced to replace almost all of the piping by May 1877, but during a new series of sea trials in the following month, the ship only reached 11.8 knots (21.9 km/h; 13.6 mph). The funnel was raised by about 20 feet (6.1 m) in an attempt to improve the draft to the boiler and 24 stokers were also added to the ship's crew during the winter of 1877–78, but neither had much effect.

=== Armament ===
Four muzzle-loading smoothbore 20-inch (508 mm) guns, based on the American Rodman design, were originally intended as Petr Veliky's main armament, but the Russians were impressed by a demonstration of a new Krupp 28-centimeter (11 in) rifled gun. They bought a few guns directly as well as a production license and an enlarged 12-inch, 20-caliber, gun was selected to replace the 20-inch guns. In order to keep the gun ports as small as possible the hydraulic turret machinery raised and lowered the guns' trunnions rather than their muzzles. They had a maximum elevation of +12.5° and a maximum depression of −2.5°. This gave the guns a range of about 5,800 yards (5,300 m) at maximum elevation. The gun turrets were of the Coles type and weighed 360 long tons (366 t) each. Powered by steam engines they could make a complete 360° rotation in one minute, although they had a firing arc of only 310°. The guns recoiled into the turrets after firing, which meant that a great deal of powder smoke was released into the turret. To counter this problem, ventilation fans were mounted in the turret roofs. The ship's machinery filled almost the entire breastwork, which forced the main gun magazines away from the turrets towards the ends of the ship, and that complicated the ammunition resupply arrangements for those guns. While some shells were stored in the breastwork, most were not, and likely would have slowed the ship's sustained rate of fire in a lengthy engagement.

A number of sources, including Campbell, claim that the ship suffered a number of cracks while firing the guns while ice-bound during the winter of 1877–78, but this incident cannot be confirmed by Russian-language sources. McLaughlin believes that any such incident would have been mentioned if it occurred, as such sources are otherwise quite candid about the ship's drawbacks.

The anti-torpedo boat armament of the Petr Veliky consisted of six four-pounder (3.4-inch (86 mm)) guns, four mounted on the bridge, and two at the stern, and two Palmcrantz one-pounder (1-inch (25 mm)) Gatling-type machine guns. Two telescoping spar torpedoes were mounted in the bow; one set at 6 feet (1.8 m) below the waterline and the other at 8 feet (2.4 m). They did not retract all the way into the hull, the excess length was hinged upwards and fastened to the bow. One spar torpedo was hinged on each side of the ship on a 70 feet (21 m) boom that was extended until it was angled at 90° to the ship's side. Furthermore, two towed Harvey torpedoes were mounted at the rear of the ship. While Petr Veliky was not really maneuverable enough to make full use of these weapons, they were a formidable deterrent to other ships trying to ram.

=== Armor ===
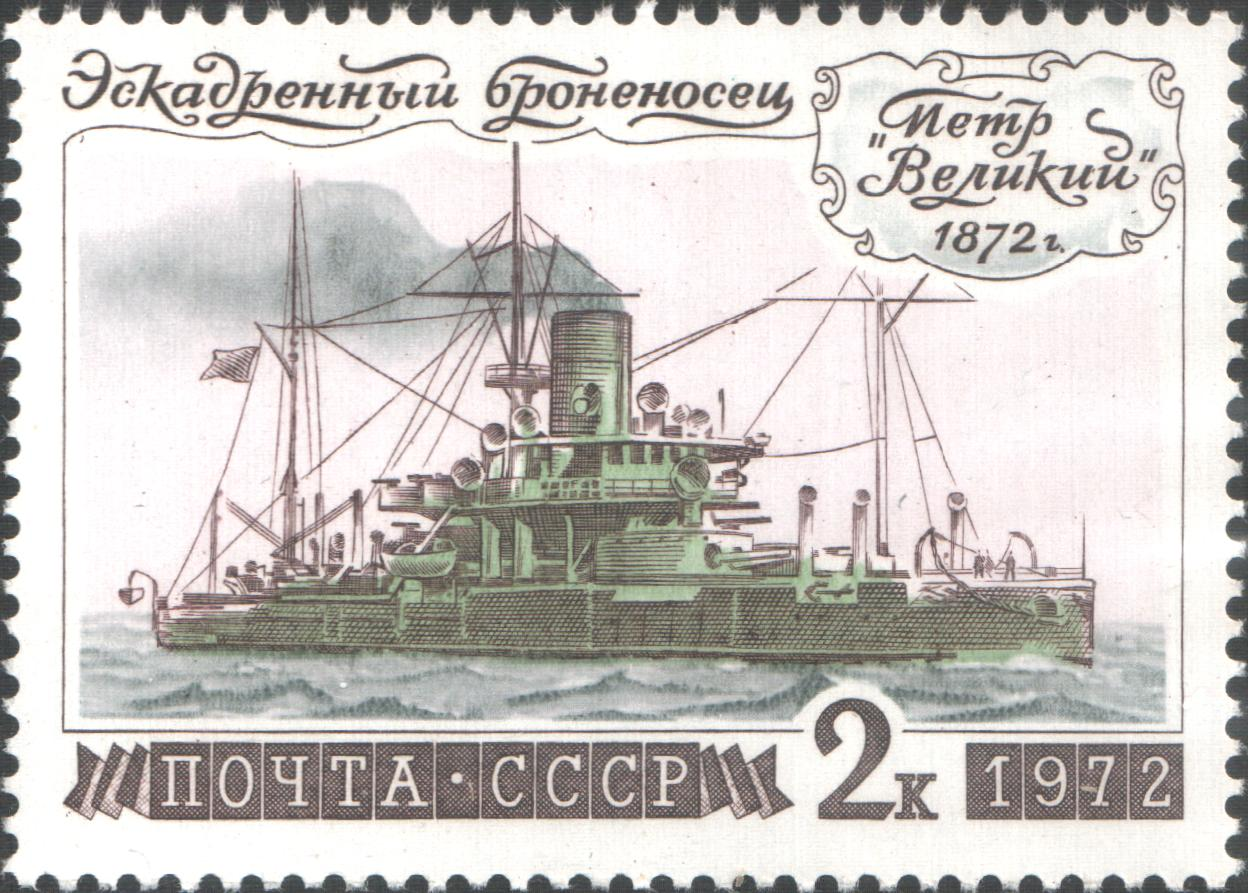
Russian ironclad Petr Veliky, stamp of USSR 1972

Petr Veliky had a complete waterline belt of wrought iron, imported from Charles Cammell & Co. of Sheffield, England, that was intended to extend 3–5 feet (0.9–1.5 m) below the waterline at the designed displacement. The belt was 14 inches thick for the middle 160 feet (49 m) of the ship, but reduced, in steps, to 8 inches (203 mm) at the bow and 9 inches (229 mm) at the stern. It was backed by multiple layers of teak and iron, thought to be equivalent of another 3 inches (76 mm) of armor. The breastwork was also 14 inches thick, although the curved portions at the end of the breastwork were Hughes compound armor because very thick plates could not be bent easily. The compound armor consisted of two 7-inch (178 mm) plates separated by a layer of teak. This type of armor was also used to protect the gun turrets. Outside the breastwork, the ship's deck was armored with three 1-inch mild steel plates. The deck protection over the redoubt was either 2.5 inches (64 mm) or three inches thick: sources vary.

== Construction and Career ==
Petr Veliky was built by the state-owned Galernii Island Shipyard in Saint Petersburg. Construction began on 1 June 1869, although her keel was not laid down until 23 July 1870. Launched on 27 August 1872, she entered service with the Baltic Fleet on 14 October 1876. She cost a then-staggering sum of over five and a half million rubles. Two 9-inch mortars were fitted on her quarterdeck during the war scare with Britain during the Russo-Turkish War of 1877–78, but they were removed in 1880 without ever having been used in combat. Two frames for launching Whitehead torpedoes were added to the ship's sides in that same year, but they proved ineffective.

Her original machinery proved unsatisfactory, and the Baird Works forfeited a payment of 254,000 rubles as penalty. The Imperial Russian Navy began to investigate replacing the ship's machinery in 1878, and a contract was finally signed with John Elder & Co., in Glasgow, Scotland, in October 1880, based on the Navy's favorable experience with the company's construction of the Imperial yacht Livadia. The ship did not reach the Scottish shipyard until 14 July 1881, and was refitting until February 1882. New vertical compound steam engines and twelve cylindrical boilers with a working pressure of 70 psi (483 kPa; 5 kgf/cm^{2}) replaced the original defective machinery. The spar torpedoes in the bow were replaced by underwater torpedo-tubes for Whitehead torpedoes and the ship's propellers and rudder were also replaced. Her funnel was also reduced back to its original height. On 4 February 1882 Petr Veliky conducted sea trials with her new machinery and reached a speed of 14.36 knots (26.59 km/h; 16.53 mph) with an engine output of 8,296 indicated horsepower (6,186 kW). The new engine and boilers were slightly lighter than their predecessors, and the ship now displaced 10,105 long tons (10,267 t).

Immediately after her sea trials the ship departed Scotland for a Mediterranean cruise. Petr Veliky made port visits at Algiers, Athens, Corfu, Naples, La Spezia and Toulon before being recalled. She visited Cádiz, Lisbon, Brest, and Cherbourg before reaching Kronstadt on 12 September. The ship remained in the Baltic Sea for the rest of her career and had her light armament modified several times. During the 1880s her rear 4-pounder guns were replaced by two 44-millimeter (1.7 in) Engström guns and two others on her bridge were moved to the roof of the forward turret. Petr Veliky's boilers were replaced in 1892, and by the mid-1890s the ship mounted two 4-pounder guns on each turret, six 47-millimeter (1.9 in) 5-barrel revolving Hotchkiss guns on the bridge and four 37-millimeter (1.5 in) Hotchkiss guns.

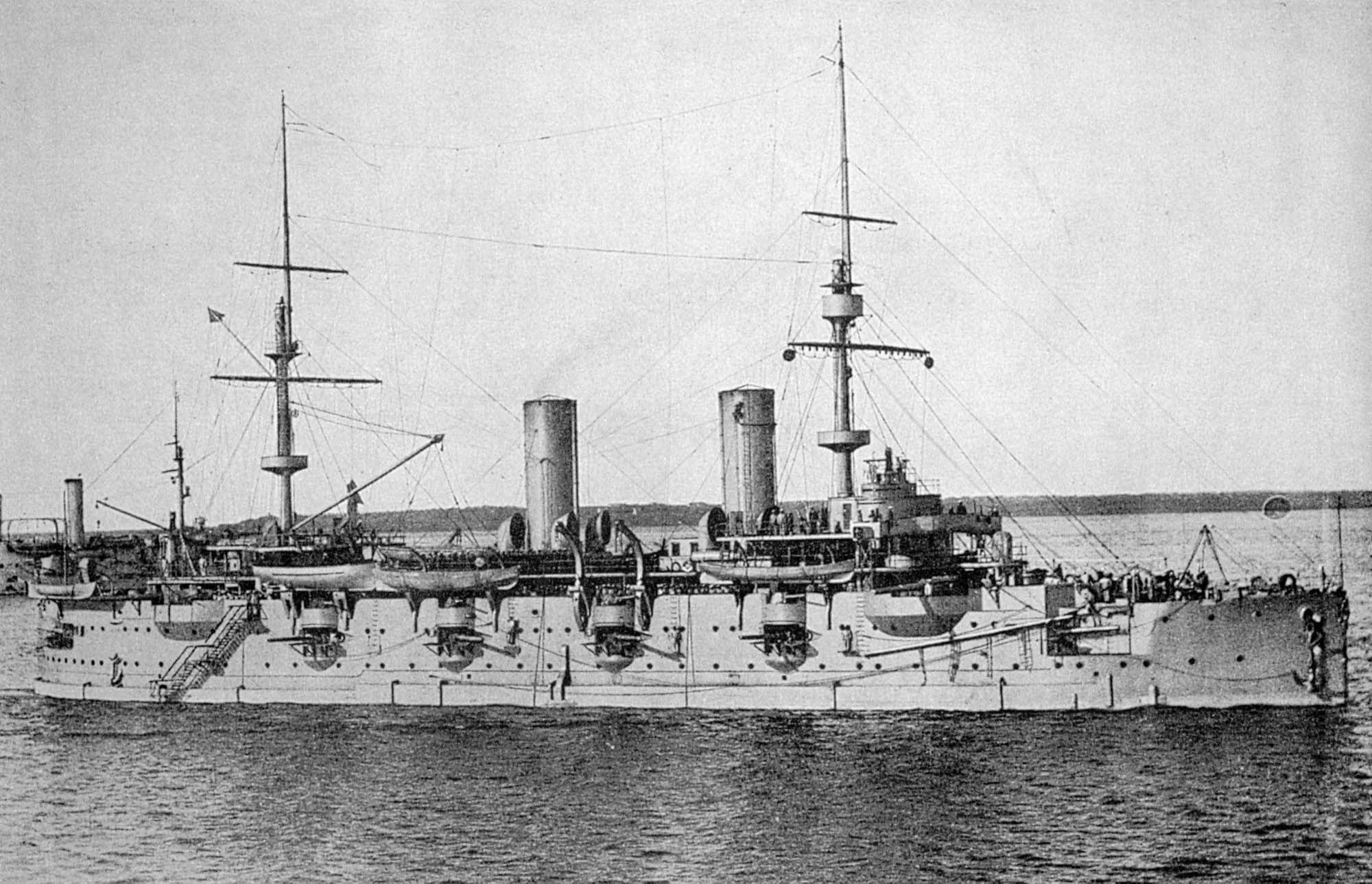
Petr Velikiy after reconstruction as a gunnery training ship

Though in 1883 Colburn's United Service Magazine and Naval Military Journal rated Petr Veliky as "up to the modern standard", by the late 1890s she was regarded by Julian Ralph as obsolete, and various proposals envisaged her "modernisation and re-armament". The most elaborate scheme would have involved raising the turrets 7 feet 6 inches (2.3 m) and building a new armored casemate between the turrets and deck with six 6-inch (152 mm) guns. The existing 14 and 12-inch wrought iron armor plates would be replaced by Krupp steel plates 8 inches (203 mm) and 7 inches (178 mm) thick respectively. Despite saving 1,000 long tons (1,016 t) by substituting the lighter steel armor for the wrought iron, the ship would have gained 674 long tons (685 t) in displacement and her draft would have increased by about 12 inches. This plan was approved, albeit with a very low priority, and her turrets were removed in October 1898, but nothing more was done. On 11 June 1903 Admiral F. K. Avelan, Minister of the Navy, ordered that she be converted into a gunnery-training ship.

A new design was approved on 2 February 1904, although the Baltic Works in Saint Petersburg had already begun cutting the ship down to the berth deck. The side armor was removed and an entirely new superstructure built. The boilers were replaced by twelve fire-tube boilers, ten refurbished ones from the Imperial yacht Polyarnaya Zvezda and two new ones. The new boilers only supplied enough steam to give the engines 5,500 indicated horsepower (4,100 kW), although a second funnel had to be added to accommodate their exhaust. Two masts were added with fighting tops. Only the ship's conning tower was now protected, with 4 inches (102 mm) of armor plate. The armament was almost entirely replaced with four 50-caliber 8-inch guns mounted in barbettes on the upper deck, sponsoned out over the sides of the ship, and six 45-caliber 6-inch guns were fitted in unarmored casemates on each side of the ship. The ship's anti-torpedo boat armament now consisted of twelve 75-millimeter (3.0 in), four 57-millimeter (2.2 in), eight 47-millimeter and two 37-millimeter guns.

The outbreak of the Russo-Japanese War of 1904-1905, almost as soon as her re-design was approved, meant that work on her slowed to a crawl, and did not resume until early 1907. The ship was completed the following year. As a result of the reconstruction, Petr Veliky was now 321 feet 10 inches (98.09 m) long overall, with a beam of 62 feet 4 inches (19.0 m) and a maximum draft of 26 feet 7 inches (8.1 m). Her displacement was now 9,790 long tons (9,947 t), almost 400 long tons (406 t) lighter than her modified displacement of 10,105 long tons. Her maximum speed was now 12.9 knots (23.9 km/h; 14.8 mph), and she carried 714 long tons (725 t) of coal. This gave a range of 1,500 nautical miles (2,800 km; 1,700 mi).

After her completion Petr Veliky was assigned to the Gunnery Training Detachment through 1917. A number of sources report her renaming by the Soviet Navy as Respublikanets (Russian: Республиканец, lit. 'Republican') or as Barrikada (Barricade), but this is not confirmed by the post-Cold War sources used by McLaughlin. That year she was assigned as a depot ship for submarines at Kronstadt and later Helsinki. The 1918 Treaty of Brest-Litovsk required the Soviets to evacuate their naval base at Helsinki in March 1918 or have their ships interned by newly-independent Finland - even though the Gulf of Finland was still frozen over. Petr Veliky reached Kronstadt in April in what became known as the "Ice Voyage". The ship was hulked on 21 May 1921 and used to store mines. She was renamed Blokshiv Nr. 1 (Hulk 1) on 4 December 1923, and forced aground in shallow water by autumn floods on 16 October 1925. She was not refloated and repaired until 5 October 1927. On 1 January 1932 she was renamed to Blokshiv Nr. 4, and to BSh-3 on 16 May 1949, by which time she was being used as a barracks ship at Kronstadt. The ship was stricken on 18 April 1959 and subsequently scrapped.
