= List of ship launches in 1869 =

The list of ship launches in 1869 is a chronological list of ships launched in 1869.

| Date | Ship | Class | Builder | Location | Country | Notes |
|---|---|---|---|---|---|---|
| 1 January | C. J. Textor | Steamship | James Laing | Sunderland | United Kingdom | For Textor & Co. |
| 1 January | Juliet | Sailing ship | Harland & Wolff | Belfast | United Kingdom | For C. T. Bowring. |
| 2 January | Miss Preston | Barque | William Watson | Sunderland | United Kingdom | For Preston & Co. |
| 12 January | Atlantic | Barque | Messrs. A. Stephen & Son | Kelvinhaugh | United Kingdom | For Mr. Tremellen. |
| 13 January | Ghazepore | East Indiaman | Messrs. John Reid & Co. | Port Glasgow | United Kingdom | For Messrs. MacKinnon, Frew & Co. |
| 13 January | Sandsend | Steamship | Messrs. Denton, Gray & Co. | Middleton | United Kingdom | For Messrs. G. Pyman & Co. |
| 14 January | Cerberus | Heiligerlee-class monitor | Rijkswerf | Amsterdam | Netherlands | For Royal Netherlands Navy. |
| 16 January | Antilles | Barque | Messrs. Archibald M'Millan & Son | Dumbarton | United Kingdom | For Messrs. M'Arthur, M'Lean & Co. |
| 18 January | Caracciolo | Corvette | Regio Cantiere | Castellammare di Stabia | United Kingdom | For Regia Marina. |
| 21 January | Venezia | Roma-class ironclad | Cantiere della Foce | Genoa | Italy | For Regia Marina. |
| 22 January | Novelty | Tanker brig | Atlantic Works | East Boston, Massachusetts | United States | For Messrs. Nash, Spaulding & Co. |
| 28 January | Seymour | Paddle steamer | Bowdler, Chaffer & Co. | Seacombe | United Kingdom | For Edward G. Willoughby. |
| 28 January | The Dotterel | Trawl boat | | Freckleton | United Kingdom | For William Leadbetter & Son. |
| 28 January | Wiltshire | East Indiaman | Messrs. Barclay, Curle & Co. | Stobcross | United Kingdom | For George Marshall. |
| 29 January | Welsh Girl | Merchantman | Mr. Thomas | Amlwch | United Kingdom | For private owner. |
| 29 January | Urano | Steamship | Messrs. William Denny & Bros. | Dumbarton | United Kingdom | For Österreichischer Lloyd. |
| 30 January | Asia | East Indiaman | Messrs. Charles Connell & Co | Overnewton | United Kingdom | For John H. Watt. |
| 30 January | Douglas | Clipper | Messrs. Thomas Royden & Sons | Liverpool | United Kingdom | For Messrs. W. & R. Wright. |
| 30 January | Roquelle | Steamship | Messrs. Randolph, Elder & Co. | Fairfield | United Kingdom | For British and African Steam Navigation Company. |
| January | Caroline | Barque | Messrs. Alexander Stephen & Sons | Kelvinhaugh | United Kingdom | For MM. Le Quellec & Bordes. |
| January | Cleopas | Barque | John Thompson | Sunderland | United Kingdom | For Henry Darling. |
| January | Elaion | Brigantine | J. Denniston | Sunderland | United Kingdom | For R. Iliff. |
| January | Fluellin | Barque | William Adamson | Sunderland | United Kingdom | For W. Adamson. |
| January | Golden Wave | Barque | Robert Thompson & Sons | Sunderland | United Kingdom | For J. Wray. |
| January | L'Impératrice | Full-rigged ship | W. Pile & Co | Sunderland | United Kingdom | For A. Pardew. |
| January | Maria de C. | Barque | Messrs. Thomas Wingate & Co. | Whiteinch | United Kingdom | For private owners. |
| January | Singapore | Merchantman | Messrs. Alexander Stephen & Sons | Kelvinhaugh | United Kingdom | For Messrs. T. H. Ismay & Sons. |
| January | Sisters | Barque | J. & E. Lumsden | Pallion | United Kingdom | For Thoms Thompson and associates. |
| January | True Blue | Barque | Oswald & Co. | Sunderland | United Kingdom | For J. Parker. |
| 10 February | Chiselhurst | Barque | Messrs. Archibale M'Millan & Son | Dumbarton | United Kingdom | For G. H. Payne. |
| 10 February | Wood Hall | Merchantman | Messrs. Blackwood & Gordon | Port Glasgow | United Kingdom | For Messrs. Henry Whittle & Co. |
| 11 February | Resolute | Schooner | Messrs. John Duthie, Sons, & Co, | Aberdeen | United Kingdom | For private owner. |
| 12 February | Antonia | Barque | Messrs. Alexander Stephen & Sons | Kelvinhaugh | United Kingdom | For MM. Le Quellec & Bordes. |
| 13 February | Cosmopolitya | Barque | William Doxford | Sunderland | United Kingdom | For Olano & Co. |
| 13 February | Cygnet | Steamboat | Watermen's Steam Packet Company | Woolwich | United Kingdom | For Watermen's Steam Packet Company. |
| 16 February | Elaine | Coaster | Harland & Wolff | Belfast | United Kingdom | For F. Lervik & Co. |
| 20 February | County of Forfar | Merchantman | Messrs. Charles Connell & Co. | Overnewton | United Kingdom | For Messrs. R. & J. Craig. |
| 25 February | Lissa | Ironclad | Stabilimento Tecnico Triestino | Trieste | Austria-Hungary | For Austrian Navy. |
| 25 February | Lucayas | Barque | Messrs. Robertson & Co. | Glasgow | United Kingdom | For Messrs. M'Arthur, M'Lean & Co. |
| 25 February | Sarah Ann Widdup | Schooner | J. Gibson | Fleetwood | United Kingdom | For Messrs. Warbrick & Co. |
| 26 February | Kildonan | East Indiaman | Messrs. Alexander Stephen & Son | Kelvinhaugh | United Kingdom | For Messrs. William Ross & Co. |
| 26 February | Mercurius | Merchantman | Messrs. Dobie & Co. | Govan | United Kingdom | For private owner. |
| 27 February | Arina | Schooner | William Doxford | Sunderland | United Kingdom | For Señor Ylurriaga. |
| 27 February | Audacious | Audacious-class ironclad | Robert Napier | Govan | United Kingdom | For Royal Navy. |
| 27 February | Duke of Edinburgh | Paddle steamer | Messrs. Wigram's | Millwall | United Kingdom | For Portsmouth & Ryde Steam Packet Company. |
| Unknown date | Kirkwood | Full-rigged ship | Bowdler, Chaffer & Co. | Seacombe | United Kingdom | For Joseph Steel & Son. |
| 27 February | Osmanby | Paddle steamer | Messrs. W. Hamilton & Co. | Port Glasgow | United Kingdom | For Imperial Ottoman Government. |
| 27 February | Volage | Volage-class corvette | Thames Ironworks and Shipbuilding Company | Leamouth | United Kingdom | For Royal Navy. |
| February | Fingoe | Barque | W. Pile & Co. | Sunderland | United Kingdom | For Henry Ellis. |
| February | Hindostan | Steamship | Messrs, Wigham, Richardson & Co. | Low Walker | United Kingdom | For private owner. |
| February | Kjobenhavn | Paddle steamer | Messrs. Henderson, Coulborn & Co. | Renfrew | United Kingdom | For private owner. |
| February | Leipzig | Steamship | Messrs. Caird & Co | Greenock | United Kingdom | For Norddeutsche Lloyd. |
| February | Linda | Schooner | Messrs. Camper & Nicholson | Gosport | United Kingdom | For private owner. |
| February | Rialto | Full-rigged ship | Oswald & Co. | Sunderland | United Kingdom | For Saunders & Co. |
| 1 March | Cambria | Steamship | Robert Duncan & Co. | Port Glasgow | United Kingdom | For Anchor Line. |
| 1 March | English Girl | Schooner | W. Allsup | Preston | United Kingdom | For Edmund Porter & Co. |
| 1 March | Patagonia | Steamship | Messrs. Randolph, Elder & Co | Fairfield | United Kingdom | For Pacific Mail Steamship Company. |
| 11 March | Congo | Steamship | John Elder | Govan | United Kingdom | For British and African Steam Navigation Company. |
| 11 March | Halcione | Merchantman | Messrs. Robert Steele & Co. | Greenock | United Kingdom | For Messrs. Shaw, Savill & Co. |
| 13 March | Active | Volage-class corvette | Thames Ironworks and Shipbuilding Company | Blackwall | United Kingdom | For Royal Navy. |
| 13 March | Agnes Muir | Clipper | Messrs. Robert Duncan & Co. | Port Glasgow | United Kingdom | For Messrs. P. Henderson & Co. |
| 13 March | Druid | Briton-class Corvette | | Deptford Dockyard | United Kingdom | For Royal Navy. |
| 13 March | Glenartney | Steamship | Messrs. William Denny & Bros. | Glasgow | United Kingdom | For Messrs. Jardine, Mathieson & Co. |
| 15 March | Hudson | Steamship | Messrs. Pearse & Co. | Stockton-on-Tees | United Kingdom | For Messrs. Tapscott & Co. |
| 15 March | Shahpore | Merchantman | Messrs. John Reid & Co. | Port Glasgow | United Kingdom | For Messrs. Mackinnon, Frew & Co. |
| 16 March | Kenmore | Schooner | Messrs Scott & McGill | Bowling | United Kingdom | For R. M'Gregor and others. |
| 16 March | Prussia | Steamship | Messrs. Denton, Gray & Co. | Hull | United Kingdom | For Messrs. Prynn, Read & Co. |
| 18 March | Doune Castle | Merchantman | John Elder | Fairfield, Glasgow | United Kingdom | For Messrs. Thomas Skinner & Co. |
| 27 March | Cape Clear | Barquentine | Bowdler, Chaffer & Co. | Seacombe | United Kingdom | For S. Myers & Co. |
| 27 March | Captain | Captain-class frigate | Laird Bros. | Birkenhead | United Kingdom | For Royal Navy. |
| 27 March | Iho-Sho-Maru | Corvette | Messrs. Hall & Co | Aberdeen | United Kingdom | For Imperial Japanese Navy. |
| 27 March | Rippling Wave | Schooner | Joseph & Nicholas Butson | Bodinnick | United Kingdom | For Knight & Co. |
| 27 March | Sardonyx | Steamship | Messrs. Robertson & Co. | Cartsdyke | United Kingdom | For Messrs. M'Arthur Bros. |
| 28 March | Spirit of the Dawn | Barque | T. R. Oswald & Co. | Liverpool | United Kingdom | For J. Bell & Son. |
| 31 March | Carry | Steam lighter | Harland & Wolff | Belfast | United Kingdom | For W. Gossage & Co. |
| March | Brackenholm | Schooner | John Banks | Kilpin Pike | United Kingdom | For John Banks. |
| March | Concliffe | Merchantman | | | United Kingdom | For private owner. |
| 1 April | Leo | Steamship | Messrs. C. & W. Earle | Hull | United Kingdom | For Messrs. T. Wilson, Sons, & Co. |
| 10 April | Mary Casson | Schooner | Daniel Griffiths | Portmadoc | United Kingdom | For William E. Morris. |
| 10 April | William Millar | Steamship | John Elder | Fairfield | United Kingdom | For Donald R. M'Gregor. |
| 13 April | Hercules | Steamship | Messrs. J. & R. Swan | Kelvinside | United Kingdom | For Messrs. Burrell & Son. |
| 13 April | River Nith | Merchantman | Messrs. Schlesinger, Davis & Co. | Walsend | United Kingdom | For Messrs. Hargrove, Fergusson & Jackson. |
| 14 April | Hawk | Cutter | John White | Cowes | United Kingdom | For Board of Customs. |
| 14 April | Silesia | Hammonia-class ocean liner | Caird & Company | Greenock | United Kingdom | For Hamburg-Amerikanische Packetfahrt-Actien-Gesellschaft. |
| 14 April | Theodore Engles | Barque | Messrs. Redhead and Softley | South Shields | United Kingdom | For private owner. |
| 15 April | Miako | composite barque | William Pile | Sunderland | United Kingdom | For Killick Martin & Company. |
| 15 April | Wylo | Composite clipper | Robert Steele & Company | Greenock | United Kingdom | built for Killick Martin & Company. |
| 16 April | Germania | Research ship | Joh. C. Tecklenborg | Geestemünde | Bremen | For Carl Koldewey. |
| 16 April | Snowdon | Paddle steamer | Messrs. Scott & Linton | Dumbarton | United Kingdom | For private owner. |
| 19 April | Fanny | Steamship | Bowdler, Chaffer & Co. | Seacombe | United Kingdom | For Isaac Zacgurry. |
| 19 April | Glenaray | Merchantman | Messrs. Archibald M'Millan & Son | Dumbarton | United Kingdom | For Messrs. Allan C. Gow & Co. |
| 21 April | Avnillah | Avnillah-class ironclad | Thames Ironworks and Shipbuilding Company | Leamouth | United Kingdom | For Ottoman Navy. |
| 24 April | Græcia | Steamship | Messrs. Scott & Co. | Greenock | United Kingdom | For Messrs. Munro & Co. |
| 24 April | Lady Cairns | Chinaman | Harland & Wolff | Belfast | United Kingdom | For Harland & Wolff. |
| 25 April | Chinsura | Frigate | Clover & Royle | Birkenhead | United Kingdom | For T. & J. Brocklebank. |
| 26 April | Abergeldie | Clipper | Messrs. Duthie & Co. | Footdee | United Kingdom | For private owner. |
| 26 April | Sagunto | Armored frigate | Reales Astilleros de Esteiro | Ferrol | Spain | For Spanish Navy. |
| 26 April | Sharperton | Barque | John Thompson | Sunderland | United Kingdom | For John Hedley. |
| 26 April | West Ridge | East Indiaman | Messrs. Dobie & Co. | Govan | United Kingdom | For G. Hamilton Fletcher. |
| 27 April | Hobart Pasha | Paddle steamer | Messrs. W. Hamilton & Co. | Port Glasgow | United Kingdom | For Imperial Ottoman Government. |
| 27 April | Lochawe | Merchantman | Messrs. Barclay, Curle & Co. | Stobcross | United Kingdom | For Messrs. J. & R. Wilson. |
| 27 April | Mary Colville | Schooner | M'Lay | Rothesay | United Kingdom | For J. W. Greenlees. |
| 28 April | County of Nairn | Merchantman | Messrs. Charles Connell & Co. | Overnewton | United Kingdom | For Messrs. R. & J. Craig. |
| 28 April | Sorata | Full-rigged ship | Bowdler, Chaffer & Co. | Seacombe | United Kingdom | For J. B. Walmsley & Co. |
| April | Araucania | Steamship | J. Elder | Govan | United Kingdom | For Pacific Steam Navigation Company. |
| April | C. E. C. G. | Ketch | Charles W. Aubin | Jersey | (United Kingdom of Great Britain and Ireland) Jersey | For Charles Cotgrove. |
| 10 May | Edgar | Steamship | Messrs. Earle | Hull | United Kingdom | For W. Nawton Smith. |
| 11 May | Glenariff | Barque | Archibald M'Millan | Dumbarton | United Kingdom | For William Porter. |
| 13 May | Sheitan | Schooner | T. Smith | Preston | United Kingdom | For T. H Miller. |
| 15 May | May Queen | Barque | A. Hall and Company | Footdee | United Kingdom} | For private owner. |
| 15 May | Melrose Abbey | Barque | Messrs. Dobie & Co. | Govan | United Kingdom | For Messrs. Cree, Renison & Co. |
| 21 May | Odessa | Steamship | Messrs. C. & W. Earle | Hull | United Kingdom | For Messrs. C. M. Norwood & Co. |
| 21 May | Quick | Lighter | Messrs. J. & R. Swan | Kelvindock | United Kingdom | For Messrs. J. T. Salveson & Co. |
| 21 May | Speed | Lighter | Messrs. J. & R. Swan | Kelvindock | United Kingdom | For Messrs. J. T. Salveson & Co. |
| 25 May | Unnamed | Brig | Messrs. Pierce & Ebenezer Roberts | Portmadoc | United Kingdom | For private owner. |
| 26 May | Charles H. Marshall | Packet ship | William H. Webb | New York | United Kingdom | For Black Ball Line. |
| 26 May | Lizzie Ann | Brig | A. Simey | Sunderland | United Kingdom | For J. Chisholm. |
| 27 May | Africa | Steamship | Messrs. W. Simons & Co. | Renfrew | United Kingdom | For African Steamship Company, or Spanish Steam Navigation Company. |
| 27 May | Dolphin | Smack | M'Lea | Rothesay | United Kingdom | For John Rattray. |
| 27 May | Girvan | Barque | London and Glasgow Engineering and Iron Shipbuilding Company (Limited) | Govan | United Kingdom | For David Hunter. |
| 27 May | Hoghton Tower | Clipper | Messrs. G. R. Clover & Co | Woodside | United Kingdom | For White Star Line. |
| 27 May | Lavinia | Barque | Messrs. Robert Steele & Co. | Greenock | United Kingdom | For Messrs. J. & W. Stewart. |
| 27 May | Pioneer | Steam fishing boat | Messrs. J. & R. Swan | Kelvindock | United Kingdom | For Messrs. Rafferty & Hay. |
| 27 May | Rosebud | Schooner | Messrs. Matthew & Carnegie | Peterhead | United Kingdom | For private owner. |
| 27 May | Shamrock | Steam fishing boat | Messrs. J. & R. Swan | Kelvindock | United Kingdom | For Messrs. O'Brien & O'Donnell. |
| 28 May | Ambassador | Chinaman | William Wallar | Rotherhithe | United Kingdom | For W. Lund and others. |
| 29 May | Invincible | Audacious-class ironclad | Robert Napier and Sons | Govan | United Kingdom | For Royal Navy. |
| May | Avagyee | Steamship | Messrs. William Denny & Bros. | Glasgow | United Kingdom | For Messrs. Patrick Henderson & Co. |
| May | Benin | Steamship | J. Elder | Fairfield | United Kingdom | For African Steamship Company, or African Royal Mail Company. |
| May | Bredalbane | Steamship | Messrs. Aitken & Mansel | Whiteinch | United Kingdom | For Messrs. John Warrack & Co. |
| May | Calvados | Coaster | | River Clyde | United Kingdom | For private owner. |
| May | City of Kingston | Full-rigged ship | Henry Dinting | Quebec | (United Kingdom of Great Britain and Ireland) Canada | For private owner. |
| May | Helge | Steamship | Messrs. Henderson, Colborn & Co. | Renfrew | United Kingdom | For private owner. |
| May | Hope | Steamship | Messrs. T. B. Seath & Co | Rutherglen | United Kingdom | For private owner. |
| May | Invierno | Schooner | Messrs. Blackwood & Gordon | Port Glasgow | United Kingdom | For private owner. |
| May | Jessie | schooner | Messrs. A. & J. Inglis | Pointhouse | United Kingdom | For Messrs. M'Crindall, Shaw & Co. |
| May | Jura | Steamship | Messrs. Scott & Linton | Greenock | United Kingdom | For Archibald M'Kenzie. |
| May | Lake Huron | Full-rigged ship | Messrs. Barclay, Curle & Co. | Stobcross | United Kingdom | For Canada Shipping Co. |
| May | Mallet | Steamship | Messrs. A. & J. Inglis | Pointhouse | United Kingdom | For Messrs. Baring Bros. & Co. |
| May | Marsden | Steamship | Messrs. Pearse & Co. | Stockton-on-Tees | United Kingdom | For private owner. |
| May | Meteor | Lightship | Messrs. Robert Napier & Sons | Govan | United Kingdom | For British Government. |
| May | Oberon | Steamship | Messrs. A. & J. Inglis | Pointhouse | United Kingdom | For Messrs. Shaw, Maxton & Co. |
| May | Otono | Schooner | Messrs. Blackwood & Gordon | Port Glasgow | United Kingdom | For private owner. |
| May | Pentheselia | Full-rigged ship | Oswald & Co. | Sunderland | United Kingdom | For Jones & Co. |
| May | Primanera | Schooner | Messrs. Blackwood & Gordon | Port Glasgow | United Kingdom | For private owner. |
| May | Princess | Steam Yacht | Messrs. Harvey | River Thames | United Kingdom | For Prince of Wales. |
| Unknown date | Thistle | Brigantine | B. Blamey | Falmouth | United Kingdom | For B. Blamey. |
| May | Verano | Schooner | Messrs. Blackwood & Gordon | Port Glasgow | United Kingdom | For private owner. |
| May | Zealandia | Full-rigged ship | Messrs. Charles Connell & Co. | Kelvinhaugh | United Kingdom | For Messrs. Shaw, Savill & Co. |
| 1 June | Mary Hamilton | Steamship | Messrs. William Hamilton & Co | Port Glasgow | United Kingdom | For Imperial Ottoman Government. |
| 4 June | Samuel P. Ely | Schooner | J. P. Clark | | United States | For Mr. Winslow. |
| 8 June | Attalo | Steamship | Messrs. Wingate | Whiteinch | United Kingdom | For Asia Minor Steamship Co. |
| 8 June | Craigforth | Steamship | London and Glasgow Engineering and Iron Shipbuilding Co. | Glasgow | United Kingdom | For Charles Williamson and others. |
| 9 June | Corfu | Barque | | Bathurst | Canada | For private owner. |
| 10 June | Artos | Steamship | Messrs. Richardson, Duck & Co. | Stockton-on-Tees | United Kingdom | For Henry Briggs and others. |
| 10 June | Astoria | Sloop-of-war | | Philadelphia Navy Yard | United States | For United States Navy. |
| 10 June | Golden Fleece | East Indiaman | Messrs. Barclay, Curle & Co. | Whiteinch | United Kingdom | For J. H. Carmichael. |
| 10 June | Neva | East Indiaman | J. G. Lawrie | Whiteinch | United Kingdom | For James Nourse. |
| 10 June | Sir Walter Scott | Clipper | Messrs. Archibald M'Millan & Son | Dumbarton | United Kingdom | For H. N. Hughes & Nephew. |
| 12 June | Cochin | Full-rigged ship | Messrs. Robertson & Co. | Greenock | United Kingdom | For John Kerr. |
| 12 June | Daphne | Clipper | Messrs. John Reid & Co. | Port Glasgow | United Kingdom | For Messrs. M'Diarmid. |
| 12 June | Hindostan | Steamship | Messrs. C. A. Day & Co. | Northam | United Kingdom | For Peninsular and Oriental Steam Navigation Company. |
| 12 June | Moratin | Steamship | Messrs. Bowdler, Chaffer & Co. | Seacombe | United Kingdom | For Messrs. James M'Andrew & Co., or Serapel Acebel y Compagnia. |
| 12 June | Muin-i Zafer | Avnillah-class ironclad | Samuda Brothers | Cubitt Town | United Kingdom | For Ottoman Navy. |
| 12 June | Palm | Steamship | Messrs. Macnab & Co. | Greenock | United Kingdom | For Messrs. Charles Horsfall & Sons. |
| 12 June | Victoria Tower | Full-rigged ship | Messrs. R. & J. Evans | Liverpool | United Kingdom | For Messrs. T. H. Ismay & Co. |
| 14 June | James Nichol Fleming | Merchantman | Messrs. Robert Duncan & Co. | Greenock | United Kingdom | For Messrs. P. Henderson & Co. |
| 14 June | Lammershagen | Merchantman | Messrs. Alexander Stephens & Sons | Kelvinhaugh | United Kingdom | For R. M. Sloman. |
| 16 June | Druid | Merchantman | David Jones | Portmadoc | United Kingdom | For private owner. |
| 17 June | Mary Jones | Merchantman | David Jones | Portmadoc | United Kingdom | For Peter & Morgan Jones. |
| 21 June | Princess Alice | Steamship | Messrs. Wigram & Co. | Millwall | United Kingdom | For Portsmouth and Ryde Steam Packet Company. |
| 23 June | Despatch | Steamship | Messrs. T. B. Seath & Co. | Rutherglen | United Kingdom | For J. Parker. |
| 24 June | Arrow | Yacht | | Bullo Pill | United Kingdom | For Henry Crawshay. |
| 24 June | City of Hankow | Merchantman | Messrs. Alexander Stephen & Sons | Kelvinhaugh | United Kingdom | For Messrs. George Smith & Sons. |
| 24 June | Countess of Dublin | Steamship | Messrs. Walpole, Webb & Bewley | Dublin | United Kingdom | For British and Irish Steam Packet Company. |
| 26 June | Lady Elizabeth | Full-rigged ship | Robert Thompson Jr. | Southwick | United Kingdom | For Messrs. Wilson & Oliver. |
| 26 June | Spindrift | Steam yacht | James M'Gregor | Ardrishaig | United Kingdom | For private owner. |
| 26 June | Vancouver | Barque | Messrs. Bowdler, Chaffer & Co. | Seacombe | United Kingdom | For Messrs. W. J. Myers, Sons & Co. |
| June | Ambassador | Clipper | William Walker | London | United Kingdom | For W. Lund & Co. |
| June | Albicore | Steamship | Messrs. H. Murray & Co. | Port Glasgow | United Kingdom | For Messrs. J. E. Swan & Bros. |
| June | Blanche | Steamship | Messrs. Henderson, Coulborn & Co. | Renfrew | United Kingdom | For MM. Mallet. |
| June | Camilla | Yacht | E. R. Thomas | Beaumaris | United Kingdom | For private owner. |
| 1 July | Felis Argentino | Paddle steamer | Messrs. Scott & Co. | Greenock | United Kingdom | For private owner. |
| 10 July | Chance | Steamship | Messrs. Denton, Gray & Co. | West Hartlepool | United Kingdom | For private owner. |
| 10 July | Essex | Steamship | Messrs. Humprhys & Pearson | Hull | United Kingdom | For Messrs. Gee & Co. |
| 10 July | Europe | Steamship | Messrs. R. Napier & Sons | Govan | United Kingdom | For MM. Marc Fraissinet Père et Fils. |
| 10 July | Hawarden Castle | Clipper | Messrs. R. & J. Evans & Co. | Liverpool | United Kingdom | For White Star Line. |
| 10 July | Henry Sempé | Barque | Messrs. Alexander Stephen & Sons | Kelvinhaugh | United Kingdom | For private owner. |
| 10 July | Lismore | Steamship | Messrs. William Denny & Bros. | Dumbarton | United Kingdom | For Messrs. Jardine, Mathieson & Co. |
| 12 July | Osaka | composite barque | William Pile | Sunderland | United Kingdom | For Killick Martin & Company. |
| 12 July | Speculator | Tug | Blundell & Mason | Runcorn | United Kingdom | For Richard Clarke, William Doo and others. |
| 14 July | Thalia | Juno-class corvette | | Woolwich Dockyard | United Kingdom | For Royal Navy. |
| 17 July | Libra | Steamship | Messrs. Gourlay | Dundee | United Kingdom | For General Steam Navigation Company. |
| 24 July | Beatrice | Schooner | John Rees | Milford Haven | United Kingdom | For private owner. |
| 26 July | Lenore | East Indiaman | Thomas Metcalf | Sunderland | United Kingdom | For Foreman & Co. |
| 26 July | Wesley | Humber Keel | George Brown | Hull | United Kingdom | For Messrs. Edward Thompson & Sons. |
| 27 July | Java | Steamship | Messrs. Robertson & Co. | Greenock | United Kingdom | For John Kerr. |
| 29 July | Norman Court | Clipper | Messrs. A. & J. Inglis | Pointhouse | United Kingdom | For Messrs. Baring Bros. & Co. |
| 22 July | Vettor Pisani | Corvette | Venice Naval Yard | Venice | Italy | For Regia Marina. |
| July | African | Steamship | J. Elder | Fairfield | United Kingdom | For Messrs. Taylor, Laughland & Co. |
| July | Europe | Steamship | Messrs. Napier & Sons | Glasgow | United Kingdom | For MM. Marc Fraissinet et Fils. |
| July | Hannover | Steamship | Messr. Caird & Co. | Greenock | United Kingdom | For Norddeutsche Lloyd. |
| July | Lenore | Steamship | Messrs. William Denny & Bros' | Dumbarton | United Kingdom | For Messrs. Jardine, Mathieson & Co. |
| July | Niger | Steamship | Iliff & Mounsey | Sunderland | United Kingdom | For C. M. Norwood & Co. |
| July | Northbrook | Full-rigged ship | Oswald & Co | Sunderland | United Kingdom | For G. Stanton. |
| July | Stavers | Barque | Towers & Nesbit | Pallion | United Kingdom | For Stavers & Co. |
| July | Trot | Schooner | | Prince Edward Island | (United Kingdom of Great Britain and Ireland) Canada | For private owner. |
| July | Versailles | Barque | J. E. Gingras | Quebec | (United Kingdom of Great Britain and Ireland) Canada | For private owner. |
| 5 August | More Vane | Steam yacht | Messrs. Laird Bros. | Birkenhead | United Kingdom | For Earl Grosvenor. |
| 7 August | Calderon | Steamship | Bowdler, Chaffer & Co. | Seacombe | United Kingdom | For MacAndrews & Co. |
| 8 August | Garnock | Barque | William Doxford & Sons | Sunderland | United Kingdom | For Hunter & Co. |
| 9 August | Loch Ken | Barque | Messrs. Laurence Hill & Co | Port Glasgow | United Kingdom | For Messrs. D. & J. Sproat. |
| 9 August | Palawan | Barque | Messrs. John Reid & Co. | Port Glasgow | United Kingdom | For Messrs. M'Diarmid, Greenshields & Co. |
| 10 August | Adolphe | Merchantman | Messrs. Aitken & Mansel | Whiteinch | United Kingdom | For M. Antoine Dominique Bordes. |
| 10 August | Appin | Steamship | Messrs. Denny & Bros. | Glasgow | United Kingdom | For private owner. |
| 10 August | City of Brussels | Passenger ship | Tod and Macgregor | Partick | United Kingdom | For Inman Line. |
| 11 August | Cumeria | Clipper | Messrs. G. R. Clover & Co. | Woodside Ferry | United Kingdom | For R. Nicholson & Son. |
| 17 August | Snowdrift | Steam yacht | Goodall | St. Helen's | United Kingdom | For Brading Harbour Oyster Fishing Co. |
| 21 August | Galatea | Steamship | Messrs. Blackwood & Gordon | Port Glasgow | United Kingdom | For John Wilkie. |
| 21 August | Helen Isabel | Barque | Messrs. Robertson & Co. | Greenock | United Kingdom | For Messrs. Baine & Johnstone. |
| 21 August | Sin Nanzing | Paddle Steamer | J. Elder | Govan | United Kingdom | For North China Steam Navigation Company. |
| 23 August | Armin | Merchantman | Messrs. Alexander Stephen & Sons | Kelvinhaugh | United Kingdom | For Herrn. D. H. Wätjen & Co. |
| 23 August | Bangkok | Steamship | Messrs. Henderson, Coulborn & Co. | Renfrew | United Kingdom | For private owner. |
| 23 August | Gongora | Steamship | Messrs. Bowdler, Chaffer & Co. | Seacombe | United Kingdom | For Messrs. M'Andrew & Co., or Serapio Acebel y Compagnia. |
| 23 August | Loch Katrine | Full-rigged ship | J. G. Lawrie | Whiteinch | United Kingdom | For Loch Line. |
| 26 August | Ailsa | Steamship | Messrs. Barclay, Curle & Co. | Stobcross | United Kingdom | For Messrs. William Sloan & Co. |
| 26 August | Magnet | Steamship | Neptune Iron Works | Waterford | United Kingdom | For Waterford Steamship Company. |
| August | Appin | Steamship | Messrs. Denny & Bros. | Dumbarton | United Kingdom | For private owner. |
| August | Leander | Barquentine | James Scrimgeour | Newburgh | United Kingdom | For private owner. |
| August | New England | Steamship | Messrs. T. Wingate & Co. | Whiteinch | United Kingdom | For Clarence and New England Steam Navigation Company. |
| August | Scarange | Steamship | Messrs. T. B. Leath & Co. | Rutherglen | United Kingdom | For private owner. |
| August | Vagliano | Steamship | Messrs. T. B. Leath & Co. | Rutherglen | United Kingdom | For private owner. |
| 4 September | Frankfort Hall | Merchantman | Messrs. R. J. Evans & Co. | Liverpool | United Kingdom | For Messrs. E. C. Friend & Co. |
| 4 September | Loke | John Ericsson-class monitor | Motala Verkstad | Norrköping | Sweden | For Royal Swedish Navy. |
| 4 September | Tamesa | Full-rigged ship | William Doxford & Sons | Sunderland | United Kingdom | For Jolly & Co. |
| 6 September | Caliph | Clipper | Messrs. Hall | Aberdeen | United Kingdom | For Alexander Hector. |
| 6 September | Resolute | Steamship | James Laing | Sunderland | United Kingdom | For W. France. |
| 7 September | Aurora | Steamship | Messrs. William Denny & Bros. | Dumbarton | United Kingdom | For Österreichische Lloyd. |
| 7 September | Guide | Paddle steamer | Harvey & Co. | Hayle | United Kingdom | For Dartmouth Steam Packet Co. Ltd. |
| 7 September | Nile | Steamship | | Southampton | United Kingdom | For Royal Mail Steam Packet Company. |
| 7 September | Patriarch | Clipper | Messrs. Walter Hood & Co. | Aberdeen | United Kingdom | For private owner. |
| 8 September | Calm | East Indiaman | Archibald M'Millan | Dumbarton | United Kingdom | For Messrs. Adamson & Robinson. |
| 9 September | Lotta Bernard | Paddle steamer | Lewis M. Jackson | Port Clinton, Ohio | United States | For S. W. Dorsey. |
| 9 September | Lumsden | Steamship | Messrs. M. Pearce & Co. | Stockton-on-Tees | United Kingdom | For Messrs. Brownlow, Lumsden & Co. |
| 9 September | The Statesman | Steamship | Messrs. C. & W. Earle | Hull | United Kingdom | For Messrs. T. & J. Harrison. |
| 9 September | Tyrian | Steamship | Messrs. R. Duncan & Co. | Port Glasgow | United Kingdom | For Anchor Line. |
| 11 September | Inverness | Clipper | Messrs. Hall, Russell & Co. | Aberdeen | United Kingdom | For Messrs. J. & R. Grant. |
| 11 September | Van Diemen | Barque | Messrs. Bowdler, Chaffer & Co. | Seacombe | United Kingdom | For Messrs. W. J. Myers, Sons, & Co. |
| 18 September | Maastroon | Steamship | Fijenoord | Rotterdam | Netherlands | For Nederlandse Stoomboot Maatsschappij. |
| 20 September | Bittern | Plover-class gunvessel | | Pembroke Dockyard | United Kingdom | For Royal Navy. |
| 21 September | Loch Ness | Full-rigged ship | Messrs. Barclay, Curle & Co. | Whiteinch | United Kingdom | For Loch Line. |
| 22 September | Alexandre | Merchantman | Messrs. Aitken & Mansel | Whiteinch | United Kingdom | For M. A. D. Bordes. |
| 23 September | Christian MacAusland | Merchantman | Messrs. Scott & Co. | Greenock | United Kingdom | For Messrs. P. Henderson & Co. |
| 23 September | Frankland | Steamship | James Laing | Sunderland | United Kingdom | For Henry T. Morton. |
| 23 September | Vale o' Doon | Barque | Messrs. M'Culloch, Patterson & Co. | Port Glasgow | United Kingdom | For private owner. |
| 25 September | Zakynthos | Steamship | Messrs. Bowdler, Chaffer & Co. | Seacombe | United Kingdom | For Messrs. J. Glynn & Son. |
| September | Abbey Holme | Barque | J. Blumer & Co | Sunderland | United Kingdom | For Nicholson & Co. |
| September | Abden | Steamship | Key | Kirkcaldy | United Kingdom | For private owner. |
| September | City of Madrid | East Indiaman | Messrs. Charles Connell & Co. | Overnewton | United Kingdom | For Messrs. George Smith & Son. |
| September | City of York | Barque | J. Elder & Co. | Glasgow | United Kingdom | For George Smith & Sons. |
| September | Eddystone | Steamship | Messrs. Blackwood & Gordon | Port Glasgow | United Kingdom | For Glasgow Screw Steam Shipping Co. |
| September | Fifeshire | East Indiaman | Messrs. Dobie & Co. | Govan | United Kingdom | For Messrs. Law, Taylor & Co. |
| September | Sol | Steamship | Messrs. Robertson & Co. | Greenock | United Kingdom | For Messrs. M'Crindell, Shaw & Co. |
| 5 October | Otago | Barque | Messrs. Alexander Stephen & Son | Kelvinhaugh | United Kingdom | For Angus Cameron. |
| 5 October | The Princess | Steamship | Messrs. Humphreys & Pearson | Hull | United Kingdom | For Messrs. Gee & Co. |
| 6 October | Duke of Abercorn | Merchantman | Messrs. Charles Connell & Co. | Overnewton | United Kingdom | For Messrs. Montgomerie & Greenhorn. |
| 7 October | Bavarian | Cargo ship | Harland & Wolff | Belfast | United Kingdom | For J. Bibby & Sons. |
| 7 October | Killiney | Steamship | Messrs. Walpole, Webb & Bewley | Dublin | United Kingdom | For James Shaw Campbell. |
| 9 October | Walton | Barque | Vaux | Harwich | United Kingdom | For private owner. |
| 18 October | James Service | Barque | Messrs. Dobie & Co. | Govan | United Kingdom | For A. Currie and others. |
| 18 October | Killin | Schooner | Messrs. Scott & Macgill | Bowling | United Kingdom | For private owner. |
| 19 October | Umvoti | Barque | Hall, Russel & Co. Ltd. | Aberdeen | United Kingdom | For John T. Rennie. |
| 20 October | Eastern Isles | Steamship | Messrs. A. M'Millan & Sons | Dumbarton | United Kingdom | For private owner. |
| 20 October | Loch Earn | Full-rigged ship | J. G. Lawrie & Co. | Whiteinch | United Kingdom | For Loch Line. |
| 20 October | Wilhelmine Emma | Steamship | Messrs. T. Wingate & Co. | Whiteinch | United Kingdom | For Messrs. Miller Bros. |
| 21 October | Amelia | Paddle steamer | Messrs. W. Hamilton & Co. | Port Glasgow | United Kingdom | For Imperial Ottoman Government. |
| 21 October | Cathcart | Merchantman | Messrs. Robert Steele & Co. | Greenock | United Kingdom | For George Adam and others. |
| 22 October | La Bonne Intention | Barque | Messrs. Hodgson & Soulby | Blyth | United Kingdom | For Mr. McLaren. |
| 23 October | Anglia | Steamship | Messrs. A. Stephens & Sons | Kelvinhaugh | United Kingdom | For Anchor Line. |
| 23 October | Dido | Eclipse-class sloop | | Portsmouth Dockyard | United Kingdom | For Royal Navy. |
| 26 October | Fitzpatrick | Steamship | Messrs. Blackwood & Gordon | Port Glasgow | United Kingdom | For Messrs. Burrell & M'Laren. |
| 27 October | Gateside | Barque | Messrs. A. M'Millan & Son | Dumbarton | United Kingdom | For private owner. |
| October | Cumbrae | Steamship | Messrs. William Simons & Co. | Renfrew | United Kingdom | For Glasgow and Cork Steam Packet Co. |
| October | Espero | Steamship | Messrs. William Denny & Bros. | Dumbarton | United Kingdom | For Österreichischer Lloyd. |
| October | Loch Tay | Barque | Messrs. Barclay, Curle & Co. | Whiteinch | United Kingdom | For Loch Line. |
| October | Minister Abbatucci | Steamship | Messrs. Scott & Co. | Greenock | United Kingdom | For private owner. |
| 3 November | Minin | Cruiser | Baltic Works | Saint Petersburg | Russia | For Imperial Russian Navy. |
| 4 November | Eme | Clipper | Messrs. Charles Connell & Co. | Overnewton | United Kingdom | For Wade & Co and others. |
| 4 November | Guiding Star | Clipper | John Watson | Banff | United Kingdom | For James Smith. |
| 5 November | Isabel | Steamship | Messrs. M'Culloch, Patterson & Co. | Port Glasgow | United Kingdom | For private owner. |
| 6 November | Briton | Briton-class corvette | | Sheerness Dockyard | United Kingdom | For Royal Navy. |
| 6 November | Invereshie | Merchantman | Messrs. Scott & Linton | Dumbarton | United Kingdom | For Messrs. J. & R. Grant. |
| 6 November | Lota | Steamship | Messrs. Gourlay Bros. | Dundee | United Kingdom | For Messrs. Balfour, Williamson & Co. |
| 6 November | Vulture | Plover-class gunvessel | | Sheerness Dockyard | United Kingdom | For Royal Navy. |
| 8 November | Scandinavian | Steamship | Messrs. R. Steele & Co. | Greenock | United Kingdom | For Messrs. Allen, or Montreal Ocean Steamship Company. |
| 16 November | R. J. Hackett | Steamship | Peck & Masters | Cleveland, Ohio | United States | For Northwest Transportation Company. |
| 20 November | Bywell Castle | Cargo liner | Palmers Shipbuilding and Iron Company | Jarrow | United Kingdom | For Hall Brothers. |
| 20 November | Guahyba | Steamship | Messrs. Robertson & Co. | Greenock | United Kingdom | For J. Proudfoot. |
| 20 November | Rothesay | Schooner | M'Lea | Rothesay | United Kingdom | For James Campbell. |
| 20 November | Shan Tung | Steamship | Messrs. A. & J. Inglis | Pointhouse | United Kingdom | For Shanghai Steam Navigation Company. |
| 22 November | Cingalese | Barque | London and Glasgow Engineering and Iron Shipbuilding Co. | Glasgow | United Kingdom | For Messrs. William Kenneth & Co. |
| 22 November | Cutty Sark | Clipper | William Denny and Brothers | Dumbarton | United Kingdom | Jock Willis Shipping Line. |
| 23 November | Apis | Steamship | Messrs. William Denny & Bros. | Dumbarton | United Kingdom | For Österreichischer Lloyd. |
| 23 November | Brechin Castle | Merchantman | Messrs. Alexander Stephen & Sons | Kelvinhaugh | United Kingdom | For Messrs. Gregor Turnbull & Co. |
| 25 November | Elbe | Steamship | John Elder | Govan | United Kingdom | For Royal Mail Steam Packet Company. |
| 25 November | Isabel Croom | East Indiaman | Messrs. Charles Connell & Co. | Kelvinhaugh | United Kingdom | For Messrs. William & Alfred Brown & Co. |
| 26 November | Spirit of the Nith | Steamship | Messrs. Dobie & Co. | Govan | United Kingdom | For Messrs. Doward, Dickinson & Co. |
| November | Afrique | Steamship | Messrs. R. Napier & Sons | Glasgow | United Kingdom | For MM. Marc Fraissinet, Père et Fils. |
| November | General Nazar | Steamship | Messrs. Thomas Wingate & Co. | Whiteinch | United Kingdom | For Rafael Morales. |
| November | Jessie Readman | Merchantman | Messrs. Scott & Co. | Greenock | United Kingdom | For Albion Shipping Co. |
| November | Ladyburn | East Indiaman | Messrs. Robert Steele & Co. | Greenock | United Kingdom | For Robert Shankland & Co. |
| November | Ripple | Fishing smack | McCann | Hull | United Kingdom | For R. Loram. |
| November | Uno | Fishing smack | | New Holland | United Kingdom | For Mr. Rice. |
| 2 December | Wen-yu Maru | Gunboat | Messrs. Hall, Russell & Co. | Aberdeen | United Kingdom | For Imperial Japanese Navy. |
| 3 December | Endymion | Clipper | J. G. Lawrie | Whiteinch | United Kingdom | For John E. Munro. |
| 4 December | Eboe | Steamship | Messrs. Royden & Son | Liverpool | United Kingdom | For African Royal Mail Co. |
| 4 December | Marengo | Océan-class ironclad | Arsenal de Toulon | Toulon | France | For French Navy. |
| 4 December | Princess of Wales | Paddle steamer | A. Leslie & Company | River Tyne | United Kingdom | For London and North Western Railway & Lancashire and Yorkshire Railway. |
| 6 December | Myvanwy | Barquentine | Newport Iron and Wood Shipbuilding and Ship-repairing Company | Newport | United Kingdom | For W. A. Griffiths. |
| 8 December | Undine | | Königliche Werft | Danzig | Prussia | For Prussian Navy. |
| 18 December | Limari | Steamship | Messrs. Bowdler, Chaffer & Co. | Seacombe | United Kingdom | For Valparaíso Steamship Co. |
| 20 December | Arequipa | Paddle steamer | John Elder | Fairfield | United Kingdom | For Pacific Steam Navigation Company. |
| 20 December | Sphinx | Steamship | Messrs. William Denny & Bros. | Dumbarton | United Kingdom | For Österreichischer Lloyd. |
| 20 December | Tazru | Steamship | Messrs. Alexander Stephen & Sons | Kelvinhaugh | United Kingdom | For private owner. |
| December | Windsor Castle | Clipper | Messrs. J. Duthie, Sons, & Co. | Aberdeen | United Kingdom | For Messrs. Donaldson, Rose & Co. |
| Unknown date | Aldebaran | Merchantman | Rawson & Watson | Sunderland | United Kingdom | For MM. J. & E. Lumsden. |
| Unknown date | Alejandro | Barque | J. Crown | Sunderland | United Kingdom | For A. Rodriques. |
| Unknown date | Amity | Barque | Iliff, Mounsey & Co | Sunderland | United Kingdom | For E. Gourley. |
| Unknown date | America | Steamship | Henry Steers | Greenpoint, New York | United States | For Pacific Mail Steamship Company. |
| Unknown date | Annie | Barque | W. Pile | Sunderland | United Kingdom | For Holdsworth & Co. |
| Unknown date | Annie | Merchantman | George Short | Sunderland | United Kingdom | For H. Smith. |
| Unknown date | Antietam | Java-class sloop | | Philadelphia Navy Yard | United States | For United States Navy. |
| Unknown date | Aquiline | Barque | Robert Thompson Jr. | Sunderland | United Kingdom | For Foreman & Co. |
| Unknown date | Ariadne | Steamship | William Pile & Co. | Sunderland | United Kingdom | For Ryde & Co. |
| Unknown date | Arrival | Ketch | Atkinson & Thompson | Knottingley | United Kingdom | For Robert Cawthorne. |
| Unknown date | Asterion | Barque | Iliff, Mounsey & Co. | Sunderland | United Kingdom | For R. H. Penney. |
| Unknown date | Auriga | Barque | Iliff, Mounsey & Co | Sunderland | United Kingdom | For R. H. Penney. |
| Unknown date | Aztecs | Barque | W. Richardson | Sunderland | United Kingdom | For Riley & Co. |
| Unknown date | Beltana | Full-rigged ship | James Laing | Sunderland | United Kingdom | For W. Stevens. |
| Unknown date | Berean | Barque | William Pile | Sunderland | United Kingdom | For T. B. Walker. |
| Unknown date | Bourayne | Despatch vessel | | | France | For French Navy. |
| Unknown date | British Empire | Barque | William Pile | Sunderland | United Kingdom | For G. Duncan. |
| Unknown date | Cambria | Fishing trawler | John Banks | Kilpin Pike | United Kingdom | For Thomas Ramster. |
| Unknown date | Casma | Clipper | | Liverpool | United Kingdom | For White Star Line. |
| Unknown date | Caroline | Barque | Allan, Band & Co. | Sunderland | United Kingdom | For James Harry. |
| Unknown date | Centurion | Clipper | | River Clyde | United Kingdom | For private owner. |
| Unknown date | Chagford | Barque | R. Pace & Sons | Southwick | United Kingdom | For John George Hill. |
| Unknown date | Choice | Barque | S. P. Austin & Son | Sunderland | United Kingdom | For Thomas Hicks. |
| Unknown date | City of Auckland | Full-rigged ship | J. Blumer & Co | Sunderland | United Kingdom | For Suart & Co. |
| Unknown date | City of Hankow | Full-rigged ship | Alexander Stephen and Sons | Linthouse | United Kingdom | For George Smith & Sons. |
| Unknown date | Clementia | Barque | Richard Thompson | Deptford | United Kingdom | For W. Edwards. |
| Unknown date | Clifton | Barque | Gibbon & Nichol | South Hylton | United Kingdom | For G. Peckett. |
| Unknown date | Collingrove | Full-rigged ship | James Laing | Sunderland | United Kingdom | For W. Stevens. |
| Unknown date | Concordia | Barque | T. R. Oswald | Sunderland | United Kingdom | For J. G. Lubcken. |
| Unknown date | Coniscliffe | Barque | George Short | Sunderland | United Kingdom | For W. Watson. |
| Unknown date | Cymric | Full-rigged ship | T. R. Oswald | Sunderland | United Kingdom | For Middle Dock Co. |
| Unknown date | Dayot | Despatch vessel | | | France | For French Navy. |
| Unknown date | Deerhound | Barque | W. Pile & Co | Sunderland | United Kingdom | For J. Kelso. |
| Unknown date | Detmar | Schooner | | | Germany | For W. Philippi & C. |
| Unknown date | Ducouëdic | Despatch vessel | | | France | For French Navy. |
| Unknown date | Edward Austin | Merchantman | William Pickersgill | Sunderland | United Kingdom | For Hudson & Co. |
| Unknown date | Ella | Barque | Thomas Metcalf | Sunderland | United Kingdom | For Mr. Williamson. |
| Unknown date | Ella Beatrice | Barque | W. Nicholson & Sons | Sunderland | United Kingdom | For Barwick & Co. |
| Unknown date | Elliotts | Merchantman | J. & J. Gibbon | North Hylton | United Kingdom | For J. & J. Elliott. |
| Unknown date | England's Glory | Full-rigged ship | W. Pile & Co. | Sunderland | United Kingdom | For Smith & Co. |
| Unknown date | Erapendale | Full-rigged ship | Oswald & Co. | Sunderland | United Kingdom | For M'Intyre & Co. |
| Unknown date | Feth-i Bülend | Feth-i Bülend-class ironclad | Thames Ironworks and Shipbuilding Company | Leamouth | United Kingdom | For Ottoman Navy. |
| Unknown date | Finchale | Collier | James Laing | Sunderland | United Kingdom | For Morton & Co. |
| Unknown date | Flore | Frigate | | | France | For French Navy. |
| Unknown date | Fornax | Snow | J. G. & H. Lister | Sunderland | United Kingdom | For Lister & Co. |
| Unknown date | Fredriksborg | Steamship | William Lindberg | Södermalm | Sweden | For Waxholms Ångfartygs AB. |
| Unknown date | Gem | Barque | G. Short | Sunderland | United Kingdom | For William Pellier. |
| Unknown date | Gilsland | Merchantman | Liddle & Sutcliffe | Sunderland | United Kingdom | For Dodds & Co. |
| Unknown date | Glance | Barque | William Watson | Sunderland | United Kingdom | For William Pellier. |
| Unknown date | Glensannox | Merchantman | | | United Kingdom | For private owner. |
| Unknown date | Gracie | Pilot boat | Edward A. Costigan | Charlestown, Massachusetts | United States | For C. A. Hayden. |
| Unknown date | Golden Fleece | Barque | William Pile & Co. | Sunderland | United Kingdom | For H. Ellis. |
| Unknown date | Halia | Barque | George Bartram | South Hylton | United Kingdom | For R. Humble. |
| Unknown date | Heinrich Heister | Paddle steamer | Messrs. Henderson, Coulborn & Co. | Renfrew | United Kingdom | For private owner. |
| Unknown date | Hereford | Merchantman | J. Elder & Co. | Glasgow | United Kingdom | For Merchant Shipping Company. |
| Unknown date | Hermon | Barque | B. Hodgson | Sunderland | United Kingdom | For A. Richardson. |
| Unknown date | Hifz-ur Rahman | Lüft-ü Celil-class ironclad | Forges et Chantiers de la Gironde | Bordeaux | France | For Ottoman Navy. |
| Unknown date | Hugh Bourne | Merchantman | James Robinson | Sunderland | United Kingdom | For J. Robinson. |
| Unknown date | Icicle | Ice yacht | | | United States | For John Aspinwall Roosevelt. |
| Unknown date | Iclaliye | Ironclad | Stabilimento Tecnico Triestino | Trieste | Austria-Hungary | For Ottoman Navy. |
| Unknown date | Ida | Fishing trawler | John Barter | Brixham | United Kingdom | For John Petherbridge and others. |
| Unknown date | Inarime | Full-rigged ship | William Doxford & Sons | Sunderland | United Kingdom | For Glover Bros. |
| Unknown date | Infernet | Corvette | | | France | For French Navy. |
| Unknown date | Inheritance | Barque | W. H. Pearson Jr. | Sunderland | United Kingdom | For W. Eggleston. |
| Unknown date | Ione | Barque | Iliff & Mounse | Sunderland | United Kingdom | For F. Ritson. |
| Unknown date | Iris | Merchantman | Thomas Metcalf | Sunderland | United Kingdom | For D. Patterson. |
| Unknown date | Isabel | Merchantman | Allan, Bland & Co | Sunderland | United Kingdom | For Mr. Fortescue. |
| Unknown date | Jane | Merchantman | J. G. & H. Lister | Sunderland | United Kingdom | For Mr. Humphry. |
| Unknown date | John C. Potter | Merchantman | | Searsport, Maine | United States | For private owner. |
| Unknown date | Joseph L. Hurd | Steamship | | Detroit, Michigan | United States | For private owner. |
| Unknown date | Kepier | Collier | James Laing | Sunderland | United Kingdom | For H. T. Morton. |
| Unknown date | Kersaint | Despatch vessel | | | France | For French Navy. |
| Unknown date | Kingsbridge | Full-rigged ship | Oswald & Co | Sunderland | United Kingdom | For G. Stanton. |
| Unknown date | Knightsbridge | Full-rigged ship | Oswald & Co | Sunderland | United Kingdom | For G. Stanton. |
| Unknown date | Lacydon | Steamship | William Pile & Co. | Sunderland | United Kingdom | For Ryde & Co. |
| Unknown date | Lady Clive | Steamship | James Laing | Sunderland | United Kingdom | For Cory Bros. & Co. |
| Unknown date | Lady Elizabeth | Barque | Robert Thompson Jr. | Sunderland | United Kingdom | For Wilson & Co. |
| Unknown date | Langstone | Full-rigged ship | W. Pile & Co. | Sunderland | United Kingdom | For H. Ellis. |
| Unknown date | Laurel | Barque | John Davison | Sunderland | United Kingdom | For T. Anderson. |
| Unknown date | Leverington | Steamship | James Laing | Sunderland | United Kingdom | For R. Young. |
| Unknown date | Lively | Thames barge | Thomas Bevan | Northfleet | United Kingdom | For John Messer Knight and Thomas Bevan. |
| Unknown date | Louisa | Brig | | Llanelly | United Kingdom | For private owner. |
| Unknown date | Lucinda | Schooner | Philip Bellot | Gorey | (United Kingdom of Great Britain and Ireland) Jersey | For William Downing. |
| Unknown date | Lüft-ü Celil | Lüft-ü Celil-class ironclad | Forges et Chantiers de la Gironde | Bordeaux | France | For Ottoman Navy. |
| Unknown date | Malta | Steamship | T. R. Oswald | Pallion | United Kingdom | For private owner. |
| Unknown date | Mallowdale | Full-rigged ship | Lune Shipbuilding Co. | Lancaster | United Kingdom | For private owner. |
| Unknown date | Manila | Paddle steamer | Bewley, Webb & Co. | Dublin | United Kingdom | For John F. Bewley. |
| Unknown date | Marie | Barque | Iliff, Mounsey & Co. | Sunderland | United Kingdom | For M. A. Viale. |
| Unknown date | Mary Ann | Barque | John Barkes | Sunderland | United Kingdom | For J. Gibbon. |
| Unknown date | Mary Smith | Brig | W. Barkley & Co. | Sunderland | United Kingdom | For Mr. Tweddle. |
| Unknown date | May | Merchantman | R. Pace & Sons | Sunderland | United Kingdom | For T. Potts. |
| Unknown date | May Queen | Barque | James Hardie | Sunderland | United Kingdom | For William S. Forest. |
| Unknown date | Melpomene | Clipper | Messrs. John Reid & Co. | Port Glasgow | United Kingdom | For Thames and Mersey Line. |
| Unknown date | Menam | Barque | Richard Thompson | Sunderland | United Kingdom | For Swainston & Co. |
| Unknown date | Mera | Merchantman | R. Pace & Sons | Sunderland | United Kingdom | For Thorman & Co. |
| Unknown date | Mizpah | Steamship | James Laing | Sunderland | United Kingdom | For Middleton & Co. |
| Unknown date | Mitrailleuse | Gunboat | | | France | For French Navy. |
| Unknown date | Ninovah | Steamship | T. R. Oswald | Sunderland | United Kingdom | For private owner. |
| Unknown date | Neptune | Barque | John Davison | Sunderland | United Kingdom | For William Davison. |
| Unknown date | Nevada | Barque | W. Nicholson | Sunderland | United Kingdom | For Barwick & Co. |
| Unknown date | Norman Court | Tea clipper | A. & J. Inglis Ltd. | Glasgow | United Kingdom | For private owner. |
| Unknown date | Ocean Mail | Full-rigged ship | Robert Thompson Jr. | Sunderland | United Kingdom | For Patton & Co. |
| Unknown date | Vasilissa Olga | Ironclad | | Trieste | Austria-Hungary | For Royal Hellenic Navy. |
| Unknown date | Oxford | Full-rigged ship | Oswald & Co | Sunderland | United Kingdom | For Mr. Temperly. |
| Unknown date | Olympia | Paddle steamer | John English & Sons | New York | United States | For George S. Wright. |
| Unknown date | Pelaw | Steamship | James Laing | Sunderland | United Kingdom | For Hill & Co. |
| Unknown date | Pepita | Brigantine | William Doxford & Sons | Sunderland | United Kingdom | For Señor de Zuricaldy. |
| Unknown date | Phoenix | Steamship | William Doxford | Sunderland | United Kingdom | For Pile & Co. |
| Unknown date | Pride | Mersey flat | Blundell & Mason | Runcorn | United Kingdom | For James Blundell Jr. |
| Unknown date | Primos | Barque | T. R. Oswald | Sunderland | United Kingdom | For Señor de Anduza. |
| Unknown date | Pyrrha | Steamship | T. R. Oswald | Sunderland | United Kingdom | For James Westoll. |
| Unknown date | Rays of Light | Barque | W. Barkley & Co. | Sunderland | United Kingdom | For W. Burnett. |
| Unknown date | Résolue | Frigate | | | France | For French Navy. |
| Unknown date | Rover of the Seas | Barque | Robert Thompson Jr. | Sunderland | United Kingdom | For T. Thompson. |
| Unknown date | Runnymede | Barque | William Pile & Co. | Sunderland | United Kingdom | For J. Alexander. |
| Unknown date | Sailor | Steamship | Oswald & Co. | Sunderland | United Kingdom | For Lambert & Co. |
| Unknown date | Salterbeck | Barque | Mr. Beck | Workington | United Kingdom | For Joseph Blackburn & Co. |
| Unknown date | Sappho | Fishing trawler | John Banks Jr. | Kilpin Pike | United Kingdom | For John Guzzwell Jr. |
| Unknown date | Satsuma | Barque | J. Crown | Sunderland | United Kingdom | For W. Abbay. |
| Unknown date | Savernake | Clipper | | | United Kingdom | For private owner. |
| Unknown date | Second | Despatch vessel | | | France | For French Navy. |
| Unknown date | Shield | Merchantman | William Pickersgill | Sunderland | United Kingdom | For J. Douthwaite. |
| Unknown date | Speranza | Merchantman | W. Nicholson & Sons | Sunderland | United Kingdom | For Nicholson & Co. |
| Unknown date | Spirit of the South | Barque | Iliff, Mounsey & Co. | Sunderland | United Kingdom | For Maule & Co. |
| Unknown date | Stanfield | Barque | William Adamson | Sunderland | United Kingdom | For W. Adamson. |
| Unknown date | Suez | Merchantman | T. R. Oswald | Sunderland | United Kingdom | For private owner. |
| Unknown date | Sweden | Steamship | James Laing | Sunderland | United Kingdom | For C. Webster. |
| Unknown date | Talbot | Barque | Iliff, Mounsey & Co. | Sunderland | United Kingdom | For W. Ord Jr. |
| Unknown date | Tees Force | Merchantman | Spowers Bros. | Sunderland | United Kingdom | For Thompson & Co.. |
| Unknown date | Thrudvang | Monitor | | | Norway | For Royal Norwegian Navy. |
| Unknown date | Town of Liverpool | Merchantman | L. Wheatley | Sunderland | United Kingdom | For Longton & Co. |
| Unknown date | Trevanion | Barque | Robert Thompson & Sons | Sunderland | United Kingdom | For Barrass, Bros. & Co. |
| Unknown date | Tyrolean | Barque | W. H. Pearson Jr. | Sunderland | United Kingdom | For Mr. Holmes. |
| Unknown date | Undine | Gunboat | Camper and Nicholsons | Gosport | United Kingdom | For Royal Navy. |
| Unknown date | Union | Barque | John Barkes | Sunderland | United Kingdom | For Gallop & Co. |
| Unknown date | Victoria | Sternwheeler | James Trahey | Quesnel | (United Kingdom of Great Britain and Ireland) Canada | For Gustavus Blin-Wright and Thomas Wright. |
| Unknown date | Victory | Barque | Iliff, Mounsey & Co | Sunderland | United Kingdom | For J. Simpson. |
| Unknown date | Wave | Merchantman | William Pickersgill | Sunderland | United Kingdom | For Lawson & Sons. |
| Unknown date | West Ridge | Barque | | Glasgow | United Kingdom | For private owner. |
| Unknown date | White Rose | Barque | Reay and Naizby | Sunderland | United Kingdom | For Brown & Co. |
| Unknown date | William | Barque | Robert Pace & Sons | Sunderland | United Kingdom | For W. C. Allen. |
| Unknown date | Ysusquiza | Barque | W. Briggs | Sunderland | United Kingdom | For Señor N. Oliviques. |
