= List of shipwrecks in November 1871 =

The list of shipwrecks in November 1871 includes ships sunk, foundered, grounded, or otherwise lost during November 1871.

== 1 November ==
List of shipwrecks: 1 November 1871
Ship	State	Description
Alexandrina	United Kingdom	The ship ran aground off "Lappen", Denmark. She was on a voyage from Peterhead, Aberdeenshire to Stettin, Germany. She was refloated with assistance and resumed her voyage.
Emma Ash	United Kingdom	The steamship foundered in the North Sea 170 nautical miles (310 km) north east of Spurn Point, Yorkshire. Her crew were rescued by the fishing smack Thomas Shatten (United Kingdom).
Johan	Sweden	The schooner was wrecked at Porto, Portugal. Her crew were rescued. She was on a voyage from Porto to Malmö.
Ocean Bird	United Kingdom	The schooner caught fire at sea and was scuttled. Her crew were taken off the wreck on 4 November by the brig New Dominion (United Kingdom).
Rangoon	United Kingdom	The steamship struck the Cadda Rock, off Point de Galle, Ceylon and sank. All on board were rescued. She was on a voyage from Galle to Bombay, India.
Rebecca	United Kingdom	The Mersey Flat was beached at Liverpool, Lancashire in a sinking condition.
Three Sisters	United Kingdom	The sloop was wrecked on the Maplin Sands, in the North Sea off the coast of Essex. Her crew were rescued. She was on a voyage from Bremerhaven, Germany to London.
Trot	United Kingdom	The schooner was driven ashore at Duncannon, County Wexford. She was on a voyage from Liverpool to Cork.
Vixen	United Kingdom	The galiot struck the Swillies, in the Menai Strait, and sank.

== 2 November ==
List of shipwrecks: 2 November 1871
Ship	State	Description
Amphitrite	United Kingdom	The ship ran aground on the Cockle Sand, in the North Sea off the coast of Norfolk. She was on a voyage from South Shields, County Durham to London. She was refloated and taken in to Grimsby, Lincolnshire.
Giscours	France	The barque ran aground on the Owers Bank, in the North Sea. She was on a voyage from Christiania, Norway to Bordeaux, Gironde. She was refloated and taken in to Grimsby, Lincolnshire, United Kingdom in a leaky condition.
Zadkia	Ottoman Empire	The steamship ran aground in the Clyde near Dumbarton, United Kingdom. She was on a voyage from Glasgow, Renfrewshire to Yokohama, Japan. She was refloated and taken in to for Greenock, Renfrewshire in a leaky condition.

== 3 November ==
List of shipwrecks: 3 November 1871
Ship	State	Description
Acacia	United Kingdom	The ship was wrecked at "Porzione", Sicily, Italy. Her crew were rescued.
John and Eliza	United Kingdom	The ship sprang a leak and was beached at Wigtown.
Renown	(United Kingdom of Great Britain and Ireland) Guernsey	The ship ran aground on the Nore. She was on a voyage from London to Guernsey.
Sea Mew	United Kingdom	The barque was driven ashore and wrecked in the Gut of Canso. She was on a voyage from Buctouche, New Brunswick, Canada to Glasgow, Renfrewshire.
Seaton	United Kingdom	The steamship ran aground at Ramsgate, Kent. She was on a voyage from Galaţi, Ottoman Empire to Amsterdam, North Holland, Netherlands. She was refloated the next day and taken in to Ramsgate.

== 4 November ==
List of shipwrecks: 4 November 1871
Ship	State	Description
Ann Banfield	United Kingdom	The brig was abandoned in the Atlantic Ocean. Her crew were rescued. She was on a voyage from New York to Falmouth, Cornwall.
Cubana	Chile	The salvage ship, a brig, foundered off Huanaco Punta. She was on a voyage from Coronel to Lota.
Hebe	United Kingdom	The ship ran aground on the Maplin Sand, in the North Sea off the coast of Essex and sank. Her crew were rescued.
John and Elizabeth	United Kingdom	The ship ran aground in the Rabbit Islands, Ottoman Empire and was wrecked. She was on a voyage from Genoa, Italy to Constantinople, Ottoman Empire. She had broken up by 3 December.
John Liddell	United Kingdom	The steamship ran aground on the Meules Bank, in the Seine.
Monte Carmelo	Italy	The brigantine was abandoned in the Atlantic Ocean. Her crew were rescued. Her crew were rescued. She was on a voyage from Cardiff to Castellammare del Golfo, Sicily.
Sylphiden	Denmark	The ship was driven ashore at Ellewoutsdijk, Zeeland, Netherlands. She was on a voyage from Skælskør to Antwerp, Belgium.
Vittoriso	Italy	The ship ran aground on the Varne Sandbank, in the North Sea and was wrecked with the loss of all but one of her crew. She was on a voyage from Antwerp, Belgium to Civita Vecchia.
Waif	United Kingdom	The schooner collided with the steamship Boyne (United Kingdom) and sank in the Bristol Channel. Her crew were rescued by Boyne. Waif was on a voyage from Brixham, Devon to São Miguel Island, Azores.

== 5 November ==
List of shipwrecks: 5 November 1871
Ship	State	Description
Ann	United Kingdom	The brigantine ran aground on the Platters. She was on a voyage from Sunderland, County Durham to Bruges, West Flanders, Belgium. She was refloated and taken in to Harwich, Essex in a leaky condition.
Hawthorns	United Kingdom	The steamship ran aground in the Elbe. She was on a voyage from Cardiff, Glamorgan to Cuxhaven, Germany.
Marie Anne Leonine	France	The brig ran aground on the Longsand, in the North Sea off the cost of Essex. All except her captain were taken off. She was on a voyage from Skien, Norway to Saint-Brieuc, Côtes-du-Nord.
Michel Angelo	Italy	The ship was driven ashore and wrecked at Aresquièrs, Hérault, France with the loss of one of her nine crew. Five were rescued, three reported missing.
Robert Cottle	United Kingdom	The schooner ran aground off Southwold, Suffolk and was wrecked with the loss of three of her six crew. She was on a voyage from Sunderland to Ipswich, Suffolk.
St. Jean	France	The lugger struck a rock and sprang a leak. She was on a voyage from Cardiff to Basse-Indre, Loire-Inférieure. She was towed in to Brest, Finistère.
Thomas and Sarah	United Kingdom	The smack was driven ashore at Warren Point, Somerset. She was on a voyage from Swansea, Glamorgan to Watchet, Somerset.
Vier Bröder	Germany	The ship ran aground at Schmolsin. She was on a voyage from Newcastle upon Tyne, Northumberland, United Kingdom to Danzig.

== 6 November ==
List of shipwrecks: 6 November 1871
Ship	State	Description
Express	United Kingdom	The schooner was wrecked near Lockeport, Nova Scotia, Canada. She was on a voyage from Saint John, New Brunswick, to St. Margarets, New Brunswick, Canada.
Mineola	Canada	The ship departed from Sydney, Nova Scotia, for Saint John, New Brunswick. No further trace, presumed foundered with the loss of all hands.
New Orleans	United States	The ship departed from Livorno, Italy for New York. No further trace, presumed foundered with the loss of all hands.
Petrellen	Norway	The ship ran aground south of Amager, Denmark. She was refloated and taken in to Copenhagen.
Telegram	United Kingdom	The ship struck a submerged object at Pentewan, Cornwall and was damaged. She was on a voyage from Fowey to Pentewan.

== 7 November ==
List of shipwrecks: 7 November 1871
Ship	State	Description
Belvidera	United Kingdom	The ship was driven ashore and wrecked at Pondicherry, India. Her crew were rescued. She was on a voyage from Madras, India to Pondicherry.
Elizabeth Stevens	United Kingdom	The schooner ran aground on the Nore.
Esperanza	Canada	The ship departed from Montreal, Quebec for a British port. No further trace, presumed foundered with the loss of all hands.
New Orleans	United States	The ship departed from Livorno, Italy for New York. No further trace, presumed foundered with the loss of all hands.
Rauha	(Russian Empire) Grand Duchy of Finland	The ship was driven ashore at Hittarp, Sweden. She was on a voyage from Oulu to Maryport, Cumberland, United Kingdom. She was refloated and taken in to Helsingør, Denmark.
Yeddo	United Kingdom	The steamship was driven ashore at Pondicherry, India. She was refloated.

== 8 November ==
List of shipwrecks: 8 November 1871
Ship	State	Description
Bougainville	France	The ship caught fire and was abandoned at sea. Her crew were rescued. She was on a voyage from Bordeaux, Gironde to Saint-Louis, Senegal.
Katschaloff	Russia	The steamship was driven ashore neat the Solovetsky Monastery, Solovetsky Islands. She was refloated on 20 November and taken in to Arkhangelsk.
Laura	Denmark	The schooner was severely damaged by an onboard explosion at South Shields, County Durham, United Kingdom.
Roma	Canada	The brig was driven ashore and wrecked on Cape Breton Island, Nova Scotia.

== 9 November ==
List of shipwrecks: 9 November 1871
Ship	State	Description
Christoph	Germany	The steamship was driven ashore on Skagen, Denmark. She was on a voyage from Stralsund to Antwerp, Belgium. She was declared a total loss on 27 November.
Deerhound	United Kingdom	The ship collided with the steamship Rouen (France) and sank off the South Foreland, Kent. Her crew were rescued. Deerhound was on a voyage from London to Gijón, Spain.
Fanny	United Kingdom	The sloop was driven ashore at Burnham Overy Staithe, Norfolk. She was refloated.
Gnommes	Russia	The lighter sank at Kronstadt.
Jessy	United Kingdom	The schooner ran aground off Hurst Castle, Hampshire. She was refloated.
Jeune Colombe	France	The ship ran aground on the Horse Bank, in the Irish Sea off the coast of Lancashire, United Kingdom. Seven of her eight crew were taken off by the Lytham Lifeboat, her captain remaining aboard. Jeune Colombe was on a voyage from Saint-Malo, Ille-et-Vilaine to Preston, Lancashire. She subsequently became a wreck.
Ocean Skimmer	United Kingdom	The ship was driven ashore at Kertch, Russia. She was refloated.
Parveienens	Russia	The lighter sank at Kronstadt.
98	Russia	The lighter ran aground at Kronstadt.

== 10 November ==
List of shipwrecks: 10 November 1871
Ship	State	Description
Clifford	United Kingdom	The ship was abandoned in the Pacific Ocean off the coast of Chile. Her crew were rescued by the full-rigged ship Samuel Corling (United States). Clifford was on a voyage from North Shields, Northumberland to San Francisco, California, United States.
Excelsior	United States	The ship departed from New York for Liverpool, Lancashire, United Kingdom. No further trace, presumed foundered with the loss of all hands.
Herschel	Germany	The ship ran aground on the Kugel Brake. She was on a voyage from New York to Cuxhaven. She was refloated and taken in to Cuxhaven.
Mosquito	New Zealand	The 15-ton ketch was beached on Kapiti Island during a gale, and became a complete wreck.
Phoenix	United Kingdom	The steamship struck a railway bridge at Königsberg, Germany, severely damaging the bridge.
Waihopi, or Waihopai	New Zealand	The 34-ton schooner was wrecked in Palliser Bay, close to the mouth of the Ruamāhanga River, during a gale. All hands were saved.

== 11 November ==
List of shipwrecks: 11 November 1871
Ship	State	Description
Andrea	Norway	The schooner ran aground in the Øresund. She was on a voyage from Kronstadt, Russia to Aberdeen, United Kingdom. She was refloated and taken in to Copenhagen, Denmark for repairs.
Angelina	New Zealand	The 22-ton ketch became stranded and wrecked at Port Underwood, New Zealand.
Jane Fish	United Kingdom	The ship ran aground at Brouwershaven, Zeeland, Netherlands.
Jonge Pieter	Netherlands	The ship sank in the Dogger Bank. Her crew were rescued by Skulda (Sweden. Jong Pieter was on a voyage from Harlingen, Friesland to Hartlepool, County Durham, United Kingdom.
King Massba	United Kingdom	The steamship ran aground in the Niger River at Onitsha, Africa.
Lyon	United Kingdom	The schooner put in to Beaumaris, Anglesey in a sinking condition. She was on a voyage from Laxey, Isle of Man to Saltney, Cheshire.
Miriam	United Kingdom	The schooner ran aground on the Felegueiras Rocks, Porto, Portugal. Her crew were rescued. She was on a voyage from Newcastle upon Tyne, Northumberland to Porto. She sank on 1 December. She subsequently sank.
Oscar	Norway	The full-rigged ship foundered in the North Sea. She was on a voyage from London, United Kingdom to Tønsberg.
Providence	United Kingdom	The sloop was run into by the schooner Catherine Campbell (United Kingdom) and sank in the North Sea of Cleeness, Lincolnshire. Her crew were rescued. Providence was on a voyage from Middlesbrough, Yorkshire to Maldon, Essex. She was refloated on 16 December and taken in to Grimsby, Lincolnshire.
Queen of the Craft	United Kingdom	The pilot cutter was run down and sunk 2 nautical miles (3.7 km) off Penlee Point, Devon by the steamship Holsatia (Germany) with the loss of two lives.

== 12 November ==
List of shipwrecks: 12 November 1871
Ship	State	Description
Anne Helene	Germany	The ship was wrecked on the West Reef, off "Providence", Caicos Islands with the loss of two lives. She was on a voyage from Cap-Haïtien, Haiti to Falmouth, Cornwall, United Kingdom.
Berge	United Kingdom	The ship was sighted whilst on a voyage from Montreal, Quebec, Canada to a British port. No further trace, presumed foundered with the loss of all hands.
E. S. Judkins	United Kingdom	The steamship ran aground at Kertch, Russia. She was on a voyage from Newport, Monmouthshire to Taganrog, Russia. She was refloated on 15 November.
Jubilee	United Kingdom	The ship ran aground on the Horse Bank, in the Irish Sea off the coast of Lancashire. Her crew were rescued by a lifeboat. She was refloated.
Malia	Italy	The brig ran aground in the Friesche Gat. Her crew were rescued. She was on a voyage from Taganrog to Leer, Germany.
Vigilant	United Kingdom	The steamship collided with the steamship Hamburg (United Kingdom in the River Thames and was beached at Erith, Kent. Vigilant was on a voyage from London to Rotterdam, South Holland, Netherlands.

== 13 November ==
List of shipwrecks: 13 November 1871
Ship	State	Description
Amazon	United Kingdom	The steamship ran aground on the Owers Sandbank, in the English Channel off the coast of Sussex. She was on a voyage from South Shields, County Durham to Bordeaux, Gironde, France. She was refloated on 15 November and taken in to Southampton, Hampshire.
Barsingerhorn	Netherlands	The ship was driven ashore at Helsinki, Grand Duchy of Finland. She was refloated and taken in to Porkkala.
Clara	Netherlands	The schooner collided with Edwin Fox (United Kingdom) and sank in the English Channel off the coast of Devon, United Kingdom with the loss of two of the ten people on board. She was on a voyage from South Shields to Trieste.
Corby Castle	United Kingdom	The schooner ran aground and capsized in the River Dee at Mostyn, Flintshire. She was on a voyage from Saltney, Cheshire to Mostyn. She was righted.
Derwent	United Kingdom	The ship was sighted off Great Yarmouth, Norfolk whilst on a voyage from London to Sunderland, County Durham. No further trace, presumed foundered in the North Sea with the loss of all hands.
Escort	United States	The ship was severely damaged by fire at Antwerp, Belgium. She was on a voyage from Antwerp to New York. She was declared a total loss.
Hiawatha	United Kingdom	The barque was wrecked on the Goodwin Sands, Kent with the loss of fourteen of her fifteen crew. The survivor was rescued by the galley punt Leander (United Kingdom).
Jenna Hendrika	Netherlands	The ship was driven ashore at Brielle, South Holland. She was refloated.
Mangosteen	United Kingdom	The ship departed from Porthcawl, Glamorgan for Valparaíso, Chile. No further trace, presumed foundered with the loss of all hands.
Manuelitas	Italy	The barque ran aground in the Nieuwe Diep. She was on a voyage from the Black Sea to Amsterdam, North Holland, Netherlands.
Margaret	United Kingdom	The schooner was driven ashore at Pembrey, Carmarthenshire. She was on a voyage from Bonmahon, County Waterford to Burry Port, Glamorgan.
Turk	Belgium	The tug was sunk by a falling mast from Escort (United States) at Antwerp.
Victory	United Kingdom	The ship was struck a sunken wreck in the River Lune and was abandoned. She was on a voyage from Tarleton to Ulverston, Lancashire.

== 14 November ==
List of shipwrecks: 14 November 1871
Ship	State	Description
Aberdeen	United Kingdom	The ship departed from Montreal, Quebec, Canada for Granton, Lothian. No further trace, presumed foundered with the loss of all hands.
Aid	United Kingdom	The brig ran aground on the Maplin Sand, in the North Sea off the coast of Essex. She was refloated with the assistance of a tug and taken in tow for London.
Affiance	United Kingdom	The ship ran aground on the Goodwin Sands, Kent. She was refloated.
Argo	Russia	The barque ran aground on the Goodwin Sands. She was refloated with assistance and taken in to Ramsgate, Kent.
Ariadne	Netherlands	The steamship ran aground at Brouwershaven, Zeeland. She was refloated.
Aurore	France	The brig was driven ashore and wrecked at Kenfig, Glamorgan, United Kingdom. Her crew were rescued. She was on a voyage from Swansea, Glamorgan to Saint-Malo, Ille-et-Vilaine.
Benjamin Whitworth	United Kingdom	The steamship ran aground on the Cross Sand, in the North Sea off the coast of Norfolk. She was on a voyage from Bilbao, Spain to Middlesbrough, Yorkshire. She was refloated the next day.
Confidence	United Kingdom	The ship ran aground on the Dulas Rocks, Anglesey. She was on a voyage from Runcorn, Cheshire to Plymouth, Devon. Two crew were taken off by the Moelfre Lifeboat. She was refloated with the assistance of the tug Sea King (United Kingdom).
Dometian Lass	United Kingdom	The sloop was abandoned off Whitehaven, Cumberland and subsequently drifted out to sea. Her crew of four were rescued by the RNLI Whitehaven Lifeboat Elizabeth Leicester. Dometian Lass was on a voyage from Runcorn, Cheshire to the Isle of Skye, Outer Hebrides. She was subsequently towed in to Maryport, Cumberland.
Eiche	Germany	The ship foundered off Cape St. Vincent, Portugal. Her ten crew were rescued by the steamship Corisande (United Kingdom). Eiche was on a voyage from Liverpool, Lancashire, United Kingdom to Saint Thomas, Virgin Islands.
Excel	United Kingdom	The ship was driven ashore at Chapel Alford, Lincolnshire. She was on a voyage from London to King's Lynn, Norfolk. She was refloated and completed her voyage.
Fanny	United Kingdom	The sloop was driven ashore between Saltfleet and Theddlethorpe, Lincolnshire. She was on a voyage from London to Hull, Yorkshire. She was refloated.
Galaţi	Ottoman Empire	The steamship ran aground 3 nautical miles (5.6 km) from Brăila.
General Havelock	United Kingdom	The ship was driven ashore between Saltfleet and Theddlethorpe. She was on a voyage from Ryde, Isle of Wight to Hartlepool, County Durham. She was refloated.
Harvest	United Kingdom	The ship was driven ashore and wrecked at Saltfleet. She was on voyage from Rochester, Kent to Seaham, County Durham.
Ibis	United Kingdom	The sloop was driven ashore between Saltfleet and Theddlethorpe. She was refloated.
Isabella Heron	United Kingdom	The ship was driven ashore between Saltfleet and Theddlethorpe. She was on a voyage from Fécamp, Seine-Inférieure, France to Blyth. She was refloated.
John Henry Yates	United Kingdom	The schooner was driven ashore at Theddlethorpe. She was on a voyage from Sunderland, County Durham to Rochester. She was refloated.
John Twizell	United Kingdom	The ship was driven ashore at Theddlethorpe. She was on a voyage from Calais, France to Blyth, Northumberland.
Launceston	United Kingdom	The schooner ran aground on the Longsand, in the North Sea off the coast of Essex. She was on a voyage from Middlesbrough to Newport, Monmouthshire. She was refloated with assistance and found to be leaky. Launceston was taken in to Ramsgate, Kent and placed under repair.
Leonie	France	The ship collided with Pallas (United Kingdom and foundered in the North Sea off the mouth of the Humber with the loss of four of her six crew. Leonie was on a voyage from Bordeaux, Gironde to Hull, Yorkshire.
Louise Hortense	France	The ship was driven ashore at Boulogne, Pas-de-Calais. Her crew were rescued. She was on a voyage from Audierne, Finistère to Dunkirk, Nord.
Masterman	United Kingdom	The ship collided with the quayside at Havre de Grâce, Seine-Inférieure, France and was damaged. She was placed under repair.
Neanthes	United Kingdom	The schooner ran aground and sank near Ancona, Italy. She was on a voyage from Trieste to Ancona.
Nigreta	United States	The brigantine was driven ashore at Braunton, Devon, United Kingdom. Her crew were rescued by the Braunton Lifeboat. She was on a voyage from Cardiff, Glamorgan to Havana, Cuba.
Orion	United Kingdom	The ship was driven ashore on the Briggs, in the Belfast Lough. She was refloated and taken in to Belfast, County Antrim.
Pierre Desirée	France	The ship ran aground on Hooper's Sands, in the Bristol Channel. She was on a voyage from Landerneau, Finistère to Llanelly, Glamorgan. She was refloated by the Burry Port Glamorgan and was taken in to Burry Port, Glamorgan, where she sank.
Temerario	Italy	The ship was driven ashore at Theddlethorpe. She was on a voyage from Smyrna, Ottoman Empire to Hull. She was refloated and taken in to Grimsby in a leaky condition.
Widdrington	United Kingdom	The ship was driven ashore at Theddlethorpe. She was on a voyage from Calais to Blyth.

== 15 November ==
List of shipwrecks: 15 November 1871
Ship	State	Description
Amalia	United Kingdom	The brig was driven ashore at Donna Nook, Lincolnshire. She was refloated and taken in to Grimsby, Lincolnshire.
Catherine	United Kingdom	The schooner was driven ashore at Vlissingen, Zeeland, Netherlands. She was on a voyage from Pentewan, Cornwall to Antwerp, Belgium. She had become a wreck by the next day.
Eroe, or Erive	United Kingdom	The brig was driven ashore at Donna Nook. She was refloated and taken in to Grimsby.
Excelsior	United Kingdom	The schooner was driven ashore at Donna Nook. She was refloated and taken in to Grimsby.
Ida	United Kingdom	The steamship was run into by City of Brooklyn (United Kingdom) and sank in Liverpool Bay with the loss of a crew member. Survivors were rescued by City of Brooklyn and the tug Slasher (United Kingdom). Ida was on a voyage from Liverpool, Lancashire to Rotterdam, South Holland, Netherlands. The wreck was dispersed by explosives.
Margaret O'Keefe	United Kingdom	The ship foundered at Pembrey, Carmarthenshire.
Myrtle	United Kingdom	The brig was driven ashore at Donna Nook. She was refloated and taken in to Grimsby.
Reliance	United Kingdom	The tug ran aground on the Cross Sand, in the North Sea off the coast of Suffolk. She was run ashore at Caister-on-Sea, Norfolk, where she was wrecked.
Royal Sovereign	United Kingdom	The brig was driven ashore at Donna Nook. She was refloated and taken in to Grimsby.
Spartan	United Kingdom	The brigantine was driven ashore at Donna Nook. She was refloated and taken in to Grimsby.
Victoria	United Kingdom	The brigantine was driven ashore at Donna Nook. She was refloated and taken in to Grimsby.
Victoria	United Kingdom	The brigantine was driven ashore at Donna Nook. She was refloated and taken in to Grimsby.
W. G. Russell	United Kingdom	The ship was driven ashore at Donna Nook. She was refloated and taken in to Grimsby.
Eleven unnamed vessels	Flags unknown	The ships were driven ashore at Donna Nook. They were refloated and taken in to Grimsby.

== 16 November ==
List of shipwrecks: 16 November 1871
Ship	State	Description
Agnes Campbell	United Kingdom	The schooner collided with Ella Norton (United States) and sank in the English Channel off Hastings, Sussex. Her crew were rescued. Agnes Campbell was on a voyage from South Shields, County Durham to Cádiz, Spain.
Cassandra	United Kingdom	The barque was driven ashore and wrecked in Compton Bay. Her 21 crew were rescued by the Brooke Lifeboat. She was on a voyage from Madras, India to London. She was refloated on 27 November and taken in to Portsmouth, Hampshire.
Cenisio	Italy	The ship collided with the steamship Stowell (United Kingdom) and sank at Odesa, Russia.
Cruiser	United Kingdom	The barque ran aground on Oyster Island, County Sligo. She was on a voyage from Montreal, Quebec, Canada to Sligo. She was refloated.
Red Coat	United Kingdom	The brig collided with the schooner Onyx (United Kingdom) and sank in the River Mersey at Liverpool, Lancashire. Her crew survived. Red Coat was on a voyage from Lagos, Africa to Liverpool. She was refloated on 22 November.
Unerigg	United Kingdom	The ship was wrecked at Liverpool. She was on a voyage from Whitehaven, Cumberland to Dublin.
Washington	United States	The lighter ran aground at Wilmington, Delaware, and was wrecked. Her crew were rescued.
William Simpson	United Kingdom	The ship struck the pier at Sunderland, County Durham and was severely damaged. She was on a voyage from Gävle, Sweden to Sunderland.

== 17 November ==
List of shipwrecks: November 1871
Ship	State	Description
Adele	France	The ship was driven ashore on Vlieland, Friesland, Netherlands. She was on a voyage from Sundsvall, Sweden to Saint-Malo, Ille-et-Vilaine.
Albert William	United Kingdom	The ship ran aground on the Longsand, in the North Sea off the coast of Essex. She was on a voyage from Middlesbrough, Yorkshire to a port in South America. She was refloated on 26 November and taken in tow for London.
Fortitude	United Kingdom	The brig foundered 20 nautical miles (37 km) off Lowestoft, Suffolk. Her crew were rescued by the dandy smack George and Elizabeth (United Kingdom). Fortitude was on a voyage from Seaham, County Durham to Maldon, Essex.
Good Intent	United Kingdom	The schooner was abandoned off Lamorna, Cornwall in a sinking condition. Her crew were rescued by a fishing boat. She was on a voyage from Par, Cornwall to Newport, Monmouthshire.
Hephzibah	United Kingdom	The schooner was driven ashore and wrecked in Compton Bay, Isle of Wight. She was on a voyage from Saint John's, Newfoundland Colony to London.
Lotta Bernard	United States	The paddle steamer was driven ashore at Grand Marais, Minnesota. She was later refloated and taken to Duluth, Minnesota, where she was repaired.
Luigi	Italy	The brig ran aground on the Newcombe Sand, in the North Sea off the coast of Norfolk, United Kingdom and either sank or floated off and drifted out to sea. All thirteen people on board were rescued. She was on a voyage from Taganrog, Russia to Boston, Lincolnshire, United Kingdom.
Mary	United Kingdom	The ship ran aground at Inverness. She was on a voyage from Hamburg, Germany to Aberdeen.
Nancy	United Kingdom	The smack sank in Runswick Bay. Her crew survived.
Palmen	Germany	The ship ran aground in the Weser. She was on a voyage from Seville, Spain to Bremen. She was refloated and taken in to Bremen in a leaky condition.
Storm	United Kingdom	The barque was driven ashore and severely damaged at Padstow, Cornwall. She was on a voyage from Padstow to Haiti. She was refloated on 25 November and taken in to Appledore, Devon for repairs.
Zwerker	Netherlands	The ship was lost in the Friesche Gat. She was on a voyage from Newcastle upon Tyne, Northumberland, United Kingdom to Groningen.

== 18 November ==
List of shipwrecks: 18 November 1871
Ship	State	Description
Amherst	United States	The schooner was driven ashore at Cape Poge, Massachusetts. She was on a voyage from Newhaven, Connecticut, to Joggins, Nova Scotia, Canada.
Buringa	United Kingdom	The ship was sighted in The Downs whilst on a voyage from South Shields, County Durham to Bombay, India. No further trace, presumed foundered with the loss of all hands.
Chipchase, and Mary Baker	United Kingdom; United States	The schooner Chipchase collided with the barque Mary Baker in Liverpool Bay and sank with the loss of all nine crew. She was on a voyage from Liverpool, Lancashire to Bahia, Brazil. Mary Baker sank with the loss of all ten crew. She was on a voyage from Liverpool to Bermuda.
Daeb	United Kingdom	The fishing boat struck the wreck of the paddle steamer Ajax (United Kingdom) off The Mewstone, Devon and was wrecked with the loss of all hands.
Eudoxy	United Kingdom	The smack struck a wreck and sank 4 nautical miles (7.4 km) off the Galloper Sand, in the North Sea off the coast of Suffolk. Her crew were rescued by Lizzy (United Kingdom). Eudoxy was on a voyage from Great Yarmouth, Norfolk to Ostend, West Flanders, Belgium.
George and Ann	United Kingdom	The ship was abandoned in the Atlantic Ocean. She was on a voyage from Boston, Massachusetts, United States to Queenstown, County Cork.
Swordfish	United Kingdom	The ship was wrecked at Queenstown, County Cork. She was on a voyage from Chile to Queenstown. She was refloated on 10 December and beached on Spike Island, County Cork.

== 19 November ==
List of shipwrecks: 19 November 1871
Ship	State	Description
Albion	Germany	The barque was driven ashore and wrecked 4 nautical miles (7.4 km) north of Aberdeen, United Kingdom. Her ten crew were rescued by the Aberdeen Lifeboat. She was on a voyage from Rostock to Inverness, United Kingdom. Also reported as lost near Peterhead, Aberdeenshire.
Capella	Netherlands	The schooner ran aground and sank at Snogebæk, Denmark. She was on a voyage from Riga, Russia to Schiedam, South Holland.
Enigheden	Norway	The brig was driven ashore at Dungeness, Kent, United Kingdom. She was refloated and taken in to Dover, Kent.
Williams	United Kingdom	The schooner was driven ashore and wrecked at Cairnbulg, Aberdeenshire. She was on a voyage from Sunderland, County Durham to Inverness.

== 20 November ==
List of shipwrecks: 20 November 1871
Ship	State	Description
Caroline Amelia	United Kingdom	The ship was abandoned in the North Sea. Her crew were rescued. She was on a voyage from Newcastle upon Tyne, Northumberland to Rostock, Germany.
Charles	United Kingdom	The brig was wrecked at the mouth of the River Don with the loss of all six crew. She was on a voyage from Sunderland, County Durham to Aberdeen.
E.B. Allen	United States	E. B. Allenn in 2012. The wooden schooner was on a voyage to Buffalo, New York, with a cargo of grain when the bark Newsboy (United States) accidentally rammed her in Lake Huron off the coast of Michigan. She sank in 100 feet (30 m) of water at 45.016267°N 83.164983°W.
Egeria	United States	The barque was wrecked near Waterford, United Kingdom with the loss of five of her fifteen crew. She was on a voyage from Boston, Massachusetts, to Liverpool, Lancashire, United Kingdom. Also reported as wrecked on the coast of County Kerry whilst on a voyage from Montreal, Quebec, Canada to Liverpool.
Fidelio	Germany	The barque ran aground in the Elbe near Glückstadt.
Flora	United Kingdom	The barque was abandoned in the Atlantic Ocean. Her seventeen crew were rescued by Argo (United Kingdom). Flora was on a voyage from Quebec City, Canada to the Clyde.
Hattie C. Besse	United States	The four-masted sailing ship was driven ashore and wrecked 20 nautical miles (37 km) south of Cape Flattery, Washington Territory. Her crew were rescued. She was on a voyage from San Francisco, California, to the Burrard Inlet.
Lavinia	United Kingdom	The ship struck a rock off Seil, Slate Islands and sank. Her crew were rescued. She was on a voyage from Milford Haven, Pembrokeshire to Lismore, Inner Hebrides.
Osbourne	United Kingdom	The brig was driven ashore on the Hudson Rocks, near Low Hauxley, Northumberland. Her eight crew were rescued by the Hauxley Lifeboat. She was on a voyage from London to Granton, Lothian.
Oscar	Germany	The ship foundered in the North Sea.
Valentin	Belgium	The ship was driven ashore at Falmouth, Cornwall, United Kingdom. She was on a voyage from Carmen to Antwerp.
Unnamed	Flag unknown	The barque foundered off the Saltee Islands, County Wexford, United Kingdom with the loss of all hands.

== 21 November ==
List of shipwrecks: 21 November 1871
Ship	State	Description
Adelaide	United Kingdom	The brig was wrecked in Tramore Bay. Her eight crew were rescued. She was on a voyage from Waterford to Cardiff, Glamorgan.
Assoria	United Kingdom	The full-rigged ship ran aground on the Mottles Bank, off Ryde, Isle of Wight.
Balgownie	United Kingdom	The ship was damaged by fire at Liverpool, Lancashire.
Eleanor	United Kingdom	The brig was abandoned in the Atlantic Ocean by all but her captain. Her crew were rescued by J. A. de Rudder (Flag unknown).
Erling	Norway	The ship was driven ashore at Chapman Head. She was on a voyage from a Norwegian port to London, United Kingdom. She was refloated and found to be leaky.
Fear Not	United Kingdom	The schooner was driven ashore at Kircubbin, County Down. She was on a voyage from "Quoile" to Barrow-in-Furness, Lancashire.
Hallyards	United Kingdom	The ship was driven ashore at Hartlepool, County Durham. She was refloated and found to be severely leaky.
Jessie	United Kingdom	The schooner was wrecked on the Dutch coast. Her crew were rescued. She was on a voyage from Seaham, County Durham to Dordrecht, South Holland, Netherlands.
Mary Andrews	United Kingdom	The ship collided with the brig Forrance (United Kingdom) and was abandoned off the "South Light". Her crew were rescued. She was on a voyage from Troon, Ayrshire to Dublin.
Perseverance	United Kingdom	The brig was driven ashore in Studland Bay.
Sumaria	United Kingdom	The steamship was damaged by an onboard explosion in the Sloyne. She was on a voyage from Liverpool to Boston, Massachusetts, United States.
Water Hen	United Kingdom	The ship ran aground on the Tongue Sand. She was refloated and resumed her voyage.
William and Hannah	United Kingdom	The ketch was driven ashore and wrecked at Bondicar, Northumberland. Her crew were rescued. She was on a voyage from Eling, Hampshire to Dundee, Forfarshire.

== 22 November ==
List of shipwrecks: 22 November 1871
Ship	State	Description
Ahuriri	New Zealand	The 131-ton iron steamer hit an uncharted rock and sank off the Otago coast near Waikouaiti. All on board took to the lifeboat and arrived safely on shore. She was on a voyage from Lyttelton to Dunedin.
City of New London	United States	The steamship was destroyed by fire in the Thames River 5 nautical miles (9.3 km) downstream of Norwich, Connecticut, with the loss of twelve or seventeen lives. She was on a voyage from New York to Norwich.
Coulman	United Kingdom	The steamship was driven ashore at Aberdeen. She was refloated and taken in to Aberdeen.
Dalkeith	United Kingdom	The ship ran aground on the Swash, in the Bristol Channel. She was on a voyage from Bristol, Gloucestershire to Pensacola, Florida, United States.
Faucon	France	The ship was sighted off Bic, Quebec, Canada whilst on a voyage from Montreal, Quebec to a British port. No further trace, presumed foundered with the loss of all hands.
Frieulje	Germany	The koff ran aground at "Eitzenloch". She was on a voyage from Hammerfest, Norway to Hamburg.
Lennox Castle	United Kingdom	The ship ran aground at Falmouth, Cornwall. She was on a voyage from Rangoon, Burma to Falmouth.
Louise	Germany	The schooner was driven ashore at Snogebæk, Denmark. Her crew were rescued. She was on a voyage from Saint Petersburg, Russia to Aberdeen, United Kingdom. She had become a wreck by 24 November.
Maria Amelia	Portugal	The brigantine foundered. Her eight crew were rescued by a Swedish barque.
Mirage	United Kingdom	The schooner was run down and sunk in Southampton Water by the steamship Sapphire (United Kingdom). All on board survived.. She was later refloated and placed under repair.
Richard Young	United Kingdom	The steamship ran aground on the Noordwal. She was on a voyage from Rotterdam South Holland, Netherlands to Harwich, Essex. She was refloated the next day.
Sampson	United Kingdom	The schooner ran aground at "Eitzenloch". She was on a voyage from Hamburg to Southampton, Hampshire. She was refloated and towed in to Cuxhaven, Germany.
Toivo	Germany	The ship was driven ashore at Rønne, Denmark. She was on a voyage from Swinemünde to Åland, Grand Duchy of Finland.
William	United Kingdom	The ship was driven ashore at Kirkcudbright. She was on a voyage from Liverpool, Lancashire to Palnackie, Kirkcudbrightshire.
William Coulman	United Kingdom	The steamship was driven ashore near Aberdeen. Her sixteen crew were rescued by the Aberdeen Lifeboat. She was on a voyage from Liverpool to Aberdeen.

== 23 November ==
List of shipwrecks: 23 November 1871
Ship	State	Description
Alarm	United Kingdom	The schooner was driven ashore at the South Foreland, Kent. She was on a voyage from São Miguel Island, Azores to Hull, Yorkshire. She was refloated and towed in to Dover, Kent.
Hendrika	Netherlands	The galeas sprang a leak and foundered in the North Sea. Her crew were rescued by the paddle tug Balmoral (United Kingdom). Hendrika was on a voyage from Middlesbrough to Stettin.
Joseph Somes	United Kingdom	The steamship was driven ashore at "Sandhill", Lincolnshire. She was on a voyage from Kronstadt, Russia to Hull, Yorkshire. She was refloated and completed her voyage.
Marie Emilie	Sweden	The brigantine sprang a leak and foundered in the Atlantic Ocean. Her crew were rescued. She was on a voyage from Lisbon, Portugal to Uddevalla.
Plover	United Kingdom	The brig departed from Neath, Glamorgan for Fowey, Cornwall. Presumed subsequently foundered with the loss of all hands; wreckage from the ship washed ashore.
Rosina	United Kingdom	The barque was driven ashore at South Shields, County Durham. She was on a voyage from Amsterdam, North Holland, Netherlands to South Shields. She was refloated and taken in to South Shields.
Unnamed	(France) Algeria	The barque collided with another vessel and sank at Alexandria, Egypt with the loss of 75 lives.

== 24 November ==
List of shipwrecks: 24 November 1871
Ship	State	Description
Alice	United Kingdom	The ship foundered off Pointe du Hoc, Calvados, France. Her crew were rescued. She was on a voyage from London to "Carantan".
Canopa	Italy	The barque ran aground in Robin Hoods Bay. She was on a voyage from South Shields, County Durham, United Kingdom to Genoa. She floated off the next day and sank 6 nautical miles (11 km) out to sea. Her crew were rescued.
Critic	Canada	The schooner was sunk by ice at Quebec City. She was refloated.
Danube	United Kingdom	The steamship ran aground on the Royal Captain Shoal. She was refloated and put back to Singapore, Straits Settlements.
Lady Nyazza	India	The steamship ran aground off the Bhugwa Lighthouse and broke in two. She was on a voyage from Surat to Palitana.
Palestine	United Kingdom	The ship ran aground at Fremantle, Western Australia and was damaged. She was on a voyage from London to Fremantle.
Philomene	(Canada)	The schooner was sunk by ice at Quebec City. She was refloated.
Sailor's Friend	United Kingdom	The lugger was run down and sunk off Corton, Suffolk by the steamship Union Bayonnaise (France). Her crew were rescued by Union Bayonnaise.
Susquehanna	Canada	The schooner was driven ashore at Sainte-Anne-des-Monts, Quebec. Her crew were rescued. She was on a voyage from Quebec City to Newcastle upon Tyne, Northumberland, United Kingdom. She was consequently condemned.
Unnamed	United Kingdom	The collier, a brig, ran aground on the Goodwin Sands, Kent. She was refloated with assistance and taken in to Ramsgate, Kent.

== 25 November ==
List of shipwrecks: 25 November 1871
Ship	State	Description
Amelie	France	The ship was wrecked on the Chiao Bank. She was on a voyage from Cádiz, Spain to Buenos Aires, Argentina.
Commerce	United Kingdom	The schooner was driven ashore at Pentewan, Cornwall. Her crew were rescued. She was refloated on 12 December.
D. R. Stockwell	United States	The brig was destroyed by fire at New York.
Fanguhal	United Kingdom	The ship was wrecked between Cape North and Cape Breton Island, Nova Scotia, Canada with the loss of all hands.
Giuditta	Austria-Hungary	The schooner was wrecked on Paxo, Greece. She was on a voyage from Kalamata, Greece to Trieste.
Margaret	United Kingdom	The schooner was driven ashore at Pentewan. Her crew were rescued.
Oceola	United Kingdom	The barque collided with Marmion (United Kingdom) and sank off the Tuskar Rock. Some of her crew were rescued by Marmion, five were reported missing, presumed drowned. Marmion lost three of her crew. Oceola was on a voyage from Montreal, Quebec, Canada to Liverpool, Lancashire.
Rapid	Norway	The ship was driven ashore at the mouth of the Elbe. She was on a voyage from Bordeaux, Gironde, France to Hamburg, Germany.
Ripple	United Kingdom	The barque was abandoned at sea. Her crew survived. She was on a voyage from Montreal to Cork. She subsequently foundered.
Swift	United Kingdom	The ship was wrecked on the Rymon Rocks, near Penzance, Cornwall. Her crew were rescued. She was on a voyage from Falmouth, Cornwall to Cardiff, Glamorgan.
Theresa	United Kingdom	The schooner collided with the steamship Cymba (United Kingdom) in the River Thames. She was on a voyage from London to Rio de Janeiro, Brazil. She was taken in to Deptford, Kent, where she sank. She had been refloated by 30 November and taken in to Millwall, Middlesex.

== 26 November ==
List of shipwrecks: 26 November 1871
Ship	State	Description
Belle	United Kingdom	The ship collided with Grace Darling (United Kingdom) and sank off Flamborough Head, Yorkshire. Her crew were rescued. Belle was on a voyage from Whitstable, Kent to South Shields, County Durham.
Bulwark	United Kingdom	The ship was damaged by fire at Liverpool, Lancashire.
Grace Darling	United Kingdom	The ship was beached at Seaford, Sussex. She was on a voyage from London to Plymouth, Devon. She was refloated the next day and taken in to Newhaven, Sussex.
Sailor's Friend	United Kingdom	The fishing smack collided with the steamship Union Bayonnaise (France) and sank off Great Yarmouth, Norfolk. Her crew were rescued.
Village Belle	United Kingdom	The ship was driven ashore at Nidingen, Sweden. She was on a voyage from Danzig, Germany to London. She was refloated with assistance and taken in to Onsala, Sweden.
Unnamed	Flag unknown	The steamship foundered off Mallorca, Spain with the loss of all hands.

== 27 November ==
List of shipwrecks: 27 November 1871
Ship	State	Description
Adelaide Fanny	France	The steamship departed from Havre de Grâce, Seine-Inférieure for Havana, Cuba. No further trace, presumed foundered with the loss of all hands.
Freak	New South Wales	The brig was wrecked on the Great Barrier Reef. Her crew were rescued.
Jabez	(United Kingdom of Great Britain and Ireland) Bermuda	The brig was wrecked on Fox Island, Canada with the loss of all but one of her crew.
Lavinia	United Kingdom	The schooner spang a leak and sank off the Longships Lighthouse, Cornwall. Her five crew survived. She was on a voyage from Fowey, Cornwall to Cardiff, Glamorgan.
Lively	United Kingdom	The schooner was driven ashore at Ballygelly Head, County Antrim. She was on a voyage from Ardrossan, Ayrshire to Dublin.
Rostock	Russia	The lighter was lost at Marianople.
Victoria	United Kingdom	The tug sank at Alexandria, Egypt.
Ten unnamed vessels	Canada	The schooners were wrecked in the Gut of Canso.

== 28 November ==
List of shipwrecks: 28 November 1871
Ship	State	Description
Aberdeenshire	United Kingdom	The steamship ran aground at Lowestoft, Suffolk. She was on a voyage from Rouen, Seine-Inférieure, France to Hull, Yorkshire. She was refloated and resumed her voyage.
Duchess of Sutherland	United Kingdom	The ship ran aground off Penlee Point, Cornwall. She was on a voyage from Cardiff, Glamorgan to Buenos Aires, Argentina. She was refloated ant put in to Plymouth, Devon in a leaky condition.
Elizabeth	United Kingdom	The brigantine ran aground on the West Hoyle Bank, in Liverpool Bay. She was refloated.
Elizabeth, or Emily	United Kingdom	The schooner struck a sunken wreck off the Galloper Sand, in the North Sea off the coast of Suffolk and foundered. Her seven crew were rescued by the smack Two Sisters (United Kingdom). The schooner was on a voyage from Hartlepool, County Durham to Exeter, Devon.
Halcyon	United Kingdom	The brig was wrecked in the Magdalen Islands, Nova Scotia, Canada with the loss of eleven of her twelve crew. She was on a voyage from Quebec City, Canada to Stockton-on-Tees, County Durham.
Nora	United Kingdom	The steamship ran aground at Waterford. She was on a voyage from Waterford to London. She was refloated and resumed her voyage.
Peri	United Kingdom	The schooner was wrecked at Grosse-Île, Quebec, Canada with the loss of two of her crew. She was on a voyage from Gaspé, Quebec, to Jersey, Channel Islands.
Wasp	United Kingdom	The barque was wrecked in the Magdalen Islands with the loss of four of her crew. She was on a voyage from Montreal to Antwerp, Belgium.
Unnamed	Flag unknown	The brigantine capsized and sank 10 nautical miles (19 km) off Margate, Kent, United Kingdom.

== 29 November ==
List of shipwrecks: 29 November 1871
Ship	State	Description
Clio	United Kingdom	The ship caught fire at Agrigento, Sicily, Italy.
Diamant	United Kingdom	The ship ran aground off Cap Haïtien, Haiti. She was on a voyage from Grimsby, Lincolnshire to Cap Haïtien. She was later refloated.
Emilia	Portugal	The ship foundered in Cascaes Bay. Her crew survived. She was on a voyage from Pomaron to Swansea, Glamorgan, United Kingdom.
Emperor	United Kingdom	The barque was wrecked upon St. Paul Island, Nova Scotia, Canada. She was on a voyage from Quebec City, Canada to Bristol, Gloucestershire.
Georg	Denmark	The ship was wrecked on Seelands Reef. Her crew were rescued.
Mary	United Kingdom	The Mersey Flat was driven onto the West Hoyle Sandbank, in Liverpool Bay and sank. Her crew were rescued by a lifeboat.
Prince Albert	United Kingdom	The brig foundered off the coast of Yorkshire with the loss of all hands.

== 30 November ==
List of shipwrecks: 30 November 1871
Ship	State	Description
Aberdeen	Canada	The ship was driven ashore by ice in the Saint Lawrence River.
Alma	(Canada)	The ship was driven ashore by ice in the Saint Lawrence River.
American	Flag unknown	The ship was driven ashore and wrecked at Quebec City, Canada.
Ardmillan	United Kingdom	The ship was driven ashore by ice in the Saint Lawrence River at L'Islet, Quebec, Canada and was abandoned by her crew. She was on a voyage from Montreal, Quebecto Glasgow, Renfrewshire. She subsequently broke up.
Bertha Kamme	Germany	The ship ran aground on the Lemon and Owers Sandbank, in the North Sea off the coast of Norfolk, United Kingdom. Five of her crew were taken off by Kong Oscar (Norway). Three crew got on board the Lemon and Owers Lightship ( Trinity House), from where they were rescued on 15 December by the steamship Beacon ( Trinity House). Bertha Kamm3 was on a voyage from South Shields, County Durham, United Kingdom to Livorno, Italy.
Chryseis	United Kingdom	The barque was sunk by ice in the Saint Lawrence River 80 nautical miles (150 km) from Montreal. Her crew were rescued She was on a voyage from Montreal to Glasgow, Renfrewshire.
Cochrane	United Kingdom	The steamship collided with the Gladstone Bridge, Sunderland, County Durham and was damaged, as was the bridge.
Dart	United Kingdom	The ship was driven ashore at Portland, Dorset. She was refloated the next day.
Dido	United Kingdom	The ship was driven ashore at Lowestoft, Suffolk. Her crew were rescued by a smack. She was on a voyage from Blyth, Northumberland to Calais, France.
Emigrant	Norway	The barque was driven ashore by ice in the Saint Lawrence River. She was towed in to Charlottetown, Prince Edward Island, Canada in June 1872.
Gertrude	Canada	The brig caught fire in the Atlantic Ocean and was abandoned. Her crew were rescued.
Gleaner	United Kingdom	The ship struck the Crow Toes Rocks. She was on a voyage from Douglas, Isle of Man to Bristol, Gloucestershire. She put in to Milford Haven, Pembrokeshire in a leaky condition.
J. G. Ross	Canada	The ship was driven ashore by ice in the Saint Lawrence River.
Lake Huron	Canada	The ship was driven ashore by ice in the Saint Lawrence River. She was refloated in March 1872 and towed in to Indian Cove, Newfoundland Colony.
Marie Elise	France	The ship was driven ashore by ice in the Saint Lawrence River.
Pomona	United Kingdom	The ship was driven ashore by ice at L'Islet and was abandoned by her crew. She was on a voyage from Montreal to Liverpool, Lancashire.
Three Bells	Flag unknown	The ship was driven ashore by ice in the Saint Lawrence River and wrecked at Quebec City.
Venezuelan	United Kingdom	The ship ran aground at Colón, United States of Colombia. She was on a voyage from Colón to Liverpool. She was refloated and resumed her voyage.
Viola	United Kingdom	The ship was driven ashore by ice in the Saint Lawrence River.
Violet	United Kingdom	The ship foundered off Great Yarmouth, Norfolk.
Virginia	Canada	The schooner was driven ashore on Goose Island. She was on a voyage from Quebec City to Gaspé, Quebec.
Waterford	United Kingdom	The ship sank at Portland, Dorset.

== Unknown date ==
List of shipwrecks: Unknown date in November 1871
Ship	State	Description
Abstainer	United Kingdom	The ship was driven ashore near Grimsby, Lincolnshire. She was refloated.
Adelaide	United Kingdom	The ship ran aground at Howth, County Dublin. Her crew were rescued. She was on a voyage from Whitehaven, Cumberland to Malahide, County Dublin. She was refloated and beached at Dublin.
Agile	Canada	The schooner was driven ashore at Port Medway, Nova Scotia.
Amanda	United Kingdom	The ship ran aground on Neckmans-Grund, in the Baltic Sea. Her crew were rescued. She was on a voyage from Saint Petersburg, Russia to Helsingør, Denmark. She floated off and came ashore at the Rönnskär Lighthouse, Sweden and was wrecked.
Amity	United States	The ship was driven ashore at Marblehead, Massachusetts. She was on a voyage from Boston, Massachusetts, to Savannah, Georgia.
Amity	Canada	The ship was wrecked at Richibucto, New Brunswick.
Amphitrite	Greece	The brig was wrecked near Lixouri.
Anna Marie	France	The brig ran aground on the Sunk Sand, in the North Sea off the coast of Essex, United Kingdom. Her crew were rescued by Marco Polo (United Kingdom).
Anna Simpson	United Kingdom	The ship was driven ashore at Dartmouth, Devon. She was refloated.
Anne	Hong Kong	The ship was wrecked in the Keeling Islands.
Ann Fleming	United Kingdom	The ship ran aground on the Gislof. She was on a voyage from Stettin, Germany to Middlesbrough, Yorkshire. She was refloated.
Antelope	United States	The schooner was driven ashore and sank at Cape Cod, Massachusetts. Her crew were rescued.
Argo	Canada	The ship ran aground. She was refloated and put back to Saint Domingo.
Auguste	Sweden	The barque ran aground on the Bredergrund, in the Baltic Sea. She was on a voyage from Gävle to London, United Kingdom. She was refloated on 20 November and taken in to Copenhagen, Denmark.
Aunt Lizzie	United Kingdom	The barque ran aground on the English Bank, in the River Plate before 17 November. She was refloated with assistance from HMS Cracker (Royal Navy) but ran aground again and was abandoned by her crew. She was declared a total loss.
Azalea	United Kingdom	The steamship ran aground in the Suez Canal. She was on a voyage from Calcutta, India to Dundee Forfarshire. She was refloated and resumed her voyage, but had to be beached at Malta.
Azalea	United Kingdom	The steamship sprang a severe leak in the Mediterranean Sea 70 nautical miles (130 km) south east of Malta and was beached at Malta. She was on a voyage from Calcutta to Dundee.
Baron Hambro'	United Kingdom	The steamship was driven ashore on Hiiumaa, Russia. She was on a voyage from Dundee, Forfarshire to Kronstadt. She was refloated and resumed her voyage.
Bertha	United Kingdom	The ship was wrecked at "Vogum".
Berwick	United Kingdom	The barque capsized at Halifax, Nova Scotia, Canada.
Bonne Ester	France	The ship ran aground on the St. Nicholas Rocks and became leaky. She was on a voyage from Nantes, Loire-Inférieure to Gloucester, United Kingdom.
Bonnie Lassie	United Kingdom	The ship ran aground at Hartlepool, County Durham. She was on a voyage from Whitby, Yorkshire to South Shields, County Durham. She was refloated.
Brilliant	Canada Canada	The schooner was driven ashore at Port Medway.
Campbell	United Kingdom	The barque was abandoned in the Atlantic Ocean. Her crew were rescued by Maud (United Kingdom). Campbell was on a voyage from Liverpool, Lancashire to Gaspé, Quebec, Canada.
Carmine	United Kingdom	The ship was driven ashore in the Dardanelles.
Caroline O. Small	United States	The barque collided with City of Dublin (United Kingdom) and sank off The Lizard, Cornwall, United Kingdom. Her crew were rescued. She was on a voyage from Sunderland, County Durham, United Kingdom to New Orleans, Louisiana.
Catarina Mimbelli	Italy	The ship was lost at Cassis, Bouches-du-Rhône, France. She was on a voyage from Constantinople, Ottoman Empire to Colón, United States of Colombia.
Catharine	France	The ship was driven ashore at Calais. She was on a voyage from Cette, Hérault to Dunkirk, Nord.
Celine	France	The ship was driven ashore near Gravelines, Nord. She was on a voyage from Norway to Gravelines.
Charles	United Kingdom	The ship was driven ashore at Bridgwater, Somerset.
Cornelia Susanna	Netherlands	The schooner was driven ashore on "Cuzza Island", in the Adriatic Sea. Her crew survived. She was on a voyage from Sunderland to Venice, Italy. She was refloated and beached at "Fiumesino", on the Dalmatian coast.
Corypheus	United Kingdom	The ship was lost in the Coral Sea. She was on a voyage from Fuzhou, China to Melbourne, Victoria.
Credo	United Kingdom	The ship was damaged by fire at St. John, New Brunswick, Canada.
Cuatro Amigos	Spain	The barque struck a rock off Cape St. James, Singapore, Straits Settlements and was beached in Cocanux Bay. She was on a voyage from Saigon, French Indo-China to Hong Kong.
Delhi	United Kingdom	The ship was wrecked on the Indispensable Reef before 19 November. Her crew survived. She was on a voyage from Manila, Spanish East Indies to Sydney, New South Wales.
Deutschland	Germany	The steamship ran aground. She was on a voyage from Oulu, Grand Duchy of Finland to Lübeck. She was refloated and completed her voyage, arriving on 6 November. Subsequently taken in to Rostock for repairs.
Eduard Hemptenmacher	Germany	The barque was driven ashore at Neufahrwasser. She was on a voyage from Hartlepool to Danzig. She was refloated and take in to Danzig.
Emmy	United Kingdom	The ship was driven ashore in Åland, Grand Duchy of Finland. She was on a voyage from Kronstadt to an English port. She was refloated and taken in to Uusikaupunki, Grand Duchy of Finland.
Erato	(United Kingdom of Great Britain and Ireland) Jersey	The schooner was lost off "Bryan Island", Newfoundland Colony. She was on a voyage from Jersey to Gaspé.
Esperance	France	The ship was wrecked at Saint-Benoît, Réunion before 18 November. Her crew were rescued.
Essex	United Kingdom	The ship was driven ashore at Galveston, Texas, United States. She was on a voyage from Galveston to Cardiff, Glamorgan.
Express	Canada	The ship was driven ashore and wrecked at Point Monton Head, Prince Edward Island.
Fitz E. Riggs Jr.	United States	The schooner foundered in the Grand Banks of Newfoundland with the loss of all nahds.
Flower of the Fal	United Kingdom	The ship ran aground at Shurton, Somerset. She was on a voyage from Bridgwater to Aux Cayes, Haiti.
Fortuna	United Kingdom	The ship was wrecked.
France and Venezuela	France	The ship was lost whilst on a voyage from La Guaira to Bordeaux.
George Bartram	United Kingdom	The ship ran aground in the Kertch Strait. She was on a voyage from Taganrog, Russia to a British port.
Gertrude	United Kingdom	The ship ran aground at the mouth of the Gironde and was abandoned by her crew. She was on a voyage from Cardiff to Arcachon, Gironde, France.
Gesina	Netherlands	The ship was driven ashore at Hamra, Gotland, Sweden. She was on a voyage from Riga, Russia to Delfzijl, Groningen. She was refloated.
Giovanni Gasparo	Italy	The ship was wrecked. She was on a voyage from Newcastle upon Tyne, Northumberland, United Kingdom to Trieste.
Giuseppi Carras	Italy	The ship was wrecked at Brindisi. She was on a voyage from New York, United States to Venice.
Gold Hunter	United Kingdom	The ship was driven ashore at Toronto, Ontario, Canada. She was refloated, but was abandoned.
Haabets Anker	Denmark	The ship was abandoned in the Kattegat. Her crew were rescued. She was on a voyage from New York to Copenhagen.
Habil Nystrom	Sweden	The ship was driven ashore on Öland. She was on a voyage from "Kappewick" to an English port.
Harrier	United Kingdom	The barque was wrecked at the mouth of the São Francisco River before 9 November. She was on a voyage from Bahia, Brazil to New York.
Hattie Haskell	United States	The schooner was lost. She was on a voyage from St. Marys, Georgia, to Montevideo, Uruguay.
Hercules	Germany	The schooner was driven ashore on Læsø, Denmark. She was on a voyage from "Wordingborg" to Hull, Yorkshire, United Kingdom. She was refloated and taken in to Fredrikshavn, Denmark.
Historia	United Kingdom	The ship was abandoned in the Atlantic Ocean. Her crew were rescued. She was on a voyage from Jersey, Channel Islands to Darien, Georgia, United States.
Ida	United Kingdom	The ship was driven ashore at Calais. She was on a voyage from Wisbech, Cambridgeshire to Dunkirk.
Island Home	United Kingdom	The ship ran aground on the Merse Reef, in the Baltic Sea. She was on a voyage form Riga to an English port. She was refloated and put in to Bolderāja, Russia.
Janet	United Kingdom	The schooner was driven ashore at Charlottetown, Prince Edward Island, Canada.
Johanna Wilhelmina	Netherlands	The ship was driven ashore and wrecked on the east coast of Öland. She was on a voyage from Rotterdam, South Holland to Stockholm.
John Jeffery	(Dominion of Newfoundland) Newfoundland Colony	The ship was abandoned at sea. She was on a voyage from Barbados to Saint John's.
Juan I	Portugal	The ship was abandoned at sea. Her crew were rescued. She was on a voyage from St. Ubes to Halifax.
Jules	France	The brig ran aground off Domesnes, Russia.
Kantipoli	United Kingdom	The schooner was driven ashore in the Pescadores.
Kendrie Maru	Japan	The barque was wrecked in the Tsugaru Strait before 19 November. All on board, more than 500 people, were rescued.
Kooria Mooria	United Kingdom	The ship was driven ashore at Halifax. She was on a voyage from a port in Georgia United States to an English port.
Kronprinz Friedrich Wilhelm	Germany	The barque was wrecked at Bagdad. She was on a voyage from Liverpool to Bagdad.
Lake Superior	Canada	The ship was driven ashore at Cape St. Charles, Newfoundland Colony before 4 November. She was on a voyage from Montreal, Quebec to Liverpool. She was refloated and taken in to New York in a leaky condition.
Ljubenzi Perri	Italy	The ship was driven ashore at Messina, Sicily. She was refloated and found to be severely leaky.
Lotus	(United Kingdom of Great Britain and Ireland) Falkland Islands	The schooner was wrecked in the Falkland Islands. She was on a voyage from Stanley to Montevideo.
Magnolia	United Kingdom	The ship was driven ashore at Trois-Pistoles, Quebec. She was on a voyage from Bristol, Gloucestershire to Quebec City.
Maria	United Kingdom	The ship was driven ashore on Öland. She was refloated and resumed her voyage.
Marie Stein	Germany	The ship ran aground on the Rodsand. She was on a voyage from Leer to Stettin.
Mary Lovell	United Kingdom	The ship was driven ashore at Flamborough Head, Yorkshire. She was on a voyage from the Nieuwediep to South Shields.
Mercurius	United Kingdom	The ship ran aground. She was on a voyage from New York City to Galway. She was refloated and put back to New York.
Nearchus	United Kingdom	The barque was driven ashore and wrecked near "Swisschegat", West Flanders, Belgium. She was on a voyage from Cephalonia, Greece to Antwerp.
Nieuwendam	Netherlands	The ship collided with Felicitas (Flag unknown) and sank off Domesnes, Russia.
Nordstjernen	Norway	The ship was lost off the coast of the Grand Duchy of Finland.
Oriental	United Kingdom	The steamship ran aground on the Buena Viagene Rocks, off Buceo, Uruguay. Her crew were rescued. She was on a voyage from Liverpool to Rosario, Argentina. She was declared a total loss.
Otago	Flag unknown	The ship was driven ashore and burnt in Sandy Bay. Her captain was suspected of arson.
Peri	United Kingdom	The brig was driven ashore at Peaked Hill Bars, Massachusetts, United States. She was on a voyage from Puerto Rico to Falmouth, Cornwall. She was refloated and found to be leaky.
Prince de Galles	France	The schooner was wrecked on the coast of Brazil.
Pontecorvo	Norway	The ship ran aground on the Bredegrund, in the Baltic Sea before 5 November. She was on a voyage from Holmsund to Bordeaux, Gironde, France.
Prospect	Germany	The ship ran aground off the Dutch coast and was abandoned by her crew, who were rescued by a pilot boat. She was on a voyage from Danzig to Bruges, West Flanders, Belgium. She was refloated and towed in to Hellevoetsluis, Zeeland, Netherlands by the pilot boat.
Rantipole	United Kingdom	The schooner was driven ashore on "Rust Island", China. She was on a voyage from Fuzhou to Shanghai, China. She was refloated with assistance from HMS Opossum (Royal Navy) and taken in to Amoy, China, where she arrived on 27 November.
Ripple	France	The schooner was wrecked at "Brig Harbour", Labrador, Newfoundland Colony. Her crew were rescued by Speedy (United Kingdom). She was on a voyage from Montreal to a British port.
River Dee	United Kingdom	The ship was abandoned in the Atlantic Ocean before 12 November.
Sarpsborg	Norway	The ship ran aground in the Firth of Forth. She was on a voyage from Dram to Alloa, Clackmannanshire, United Kingdom.
Schuell	Germany	The ship was driven ashore on Ven, Sweden. She was on a voyage from Sunderland to Wolgast. She was refloated and resumed her voyage.
Semiramis	United Kingdom	The ship ran aground at Yeni-Kale, Ottoman Empire. She was refloated a day later.
Senator Weber	United States	The ship ran aground at Callao, Peru. She was on a voyage from the Ballestas Islands to Callao. She was refloated.
Shelebof	United States	The ship was abandoned in the Pacific Ocean. She was on a voyage from San Francisco, California, to Callao, Peru.
St. Demetrio	Flag unknown	The ship was wrecked near "Anchiato".
Stephanæbah	United Kingdom	The ship was driven ashore at Brooke, Isle of Wight. She was on a voyage from the Newfoundland Colony to London.
St. James	United Kingdom	The ship ran aground on the Conch Reef. She was on a voyage from Cardiff to New Orleans.
St. Michel	France	The brig was beached near Port-Vendres, Basses-Pyrénées. She was on a voyage from the Îles de Los, French Guinea to Marseille, Bouches-du-Rhône.
Strathardie	United Kingdom	The ship was driven ashore at "St. Valliere". She was on a voyage from Dénia, Spain to Montreal.
Uber	United Kingdom	The ship was abandoned at sea. Her crew were rescued by Saga (United Kingdom. Uber was on a voyage from Cap-Haïtien, Haiti to Boston, Massachusetts.
Venezuelan	United Kingdom	The steamship caught fire at Santa Martha and was scuttled. She was on a voyage from Liverpool, Lancashire to Colón, United States of Colombia. She was refloated and subsequently resumed her voyage.
Vidar	Norway	The ship was driven ashore and wrecked at "Gaffa".
Viola	United Kingdom	The ship ran aground off "Cape La Roche". She was on a voyage from Liverpool to Montreal.
Volusia	United Kingdom	The ship was driven ashore at Carrickfergus, County Antrim. She was on a voyage from the Orkney Islands to Cork.
Weldford	United Kingdom	The ship was abandoned at sea. She was on a voyage from Callao to Queenstown.
Yang-tze	China	The ship was wrecked in the Paracel Islands with the loss of five of her nineteen crew. She was on a voyage from Foo Chow Foo to New York.
Yuca	United Kingdom	The ship ran aground at Queenstown. She was on a voyage from Pisagua, Chile to Queenstown. She was refloated.
Zabina	United Kingdom	The schooner ran aground off Nieuwesluis, Zeeland. She was refloated on 22 November.
Zeelust	Netherlands	The ship was wrecked at "Westival".
Zegri	(United Kingdom of Great Britain and Ireland) Jersey	The ship sank at Natashquan, Quebec before 10 November. Her crew were rescued.
