= HMAS Hankow =

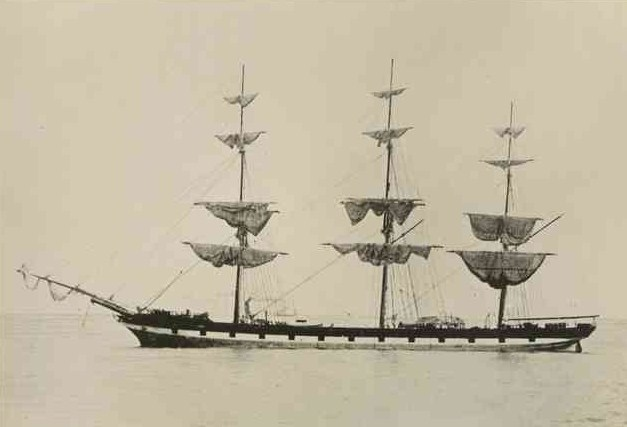
- c. 1872 'City of Hankow' at anchor

History
- Name: City of Hankow
- Namesake: Hankow, China
- Builder: Alexander Stephen and Sons, Linthouse
- Yard number: 125
- Launched: 1869

Australia (RAN)
- Name: Hankow
- Acquired: July 1913
- Fate: Sunk as a target off Darwin in 1932

HMAS Hankow was a coal hulk of the Royal Australian Navy (RAN) between 1913 until 1932.

Built in 1869 by Alexander Stephen and Sons, Linthouse as the composite fully rigged ship City of Hankow, for George Smith & Sons. Sold to G. J. Robertson, Sydney in 1900.

She was bought by the RAN in July 1913 and commissioned as HMAS Hankow for use as a coal hulk at the Garden Island Naval Base. She was towed to Thursday Island in 1923 as a hulk for the Thursday Island Coaling Station. Returned to Sydney on 11 November 1927 for refit and returned to Thursday Island on 18 January 1929. Hankow was towed to Darwin, Northern Territory in August 1932 and was used as a target outside Darwin Harbour and sunk by gunfire from HMAS Albatross on 18 September.
