= Detmar =

German schooner (1869–1894)

History

German Empire
- Name: Detmar
- Owner: W. Philippi & C
- Completed: 1869
- Out of service: 26 February 1894
- Fate: stranded and wrecked near Terschelling, Netherlands

General characteristics
- Tonnage: 273 grt
- Length: 32 m (105 ft 0 in)
- Beam: 7 m (23 ft 0 in)
- Sail plan: 2-masted schooner

Detmar was an 1869-built, 32-metre (105 ft 0 in) long, German two-masted wooden schooner. It was owned by W. Philippi & C and had a home port of Hamburg.

On 26 February 1894 the ship was driven ashore and wrecked near Terschelling, the Netherlands. The crew members were rescued by local fishermen, who were later rewarded by the Emperor of Germany. Much of the cargo was salvaged and sold, as well as the inventory and the wreck itself. For over a year after the disaster, bags of sesame seeds washed up on Terschelling.

== Ship details ==
Detmar was a German two-masted wooden schooner, built in 1869 by Focke Gebrüder at Bardenfleth. The ship was 32 metres (105 ft 0 in) long and had a beam of 7 m (23 ft 0 in) and was used as a cargo vessel. It measured 273 grt and was owned by Wilhelm Philippi & Company, with a home port of Hamburg.

== Fate ==
At about the end of November 1893, Detmar sailed from the island of Ibo, Mozambique for Hamburg, Germany, under command of captain Marks, with a cargo of sesame seeds and ebony. Marks died during the voyage before reaching the English Channel, and was buried during an intermediate call at Falmouth, England. H. Schacht from Hamburg became captain, but as it was not possible to find a German helmsman, a British pilot was taken onboard and the ship continued its voyage from Falmouth on 24 February. During the late evening of 26 February, Detmar was stranded at Noordsvaarder, on the western part of Terschelling, the Netherlands. Water was coming into the ship. The eight crew members were rescued by local fishermen from Terschelling, using the fishing vessels TS 53 of Iemke Kooiman, TS 58 of Christiaan Kuiper and TS 1 of Steven Wiegman. The salvage steamer Neptunus also went from Nieuwediep to assist the ship. However, the ship was considered lost, and sank into the sand. On 4 March Detmar began to break up, while salvage was ongoing, and a week later the ship had completely broken up.

In May 1895, more than a year after the disaster, full and empty sesame seed bags were still being washed up on Terschelling.

== Salvage ==
Soon after the accident, part of the inventory and cargo was recovered. It was stated to be dangerous work for the salvors due to the bad weather. There were negotiations to outsource the salvage operation. A large chain was recovered making the ship lighter. The work had to be carried out by divers and, by 1 March 1894, bags of seads were salvaged. Salvaged cargo was shipped to Amsterdam, the first barges arriving on 4 March with 2517 bales of seads. Salvaging continued until 8 March, with daily updates given in Dutch newspapers.

=== Sales ===
On 12 March the wreck was sold in a public sale for an amount of ƒ75,50. Two days later the inventory was auctioned for ƒ1045.60. On 22 March a sale was held in Amsterdam of 287 pieces of grenadilla wood with a total weight of 13000 kg, which fetched ƒ4479.

== Court case ==
On 3 April 1894 the office of the Maritime Board of Inquiry (in German: Seeamt) in Hamburg ruled on who was responsible for the ship's stranding and sinking. It was stated that the British pilot failed to warn the captain in time when the lighthouse of Terschelling became visible, even though the captain had asked him to do so. The captain was therefore cleared of guilt. Despite this, it was stated that with more caution the disaster could have been avoided. The rescue of the crew by the fishermen was praised.

== Rewards ==
The Dutch fishermen who saved the ship's crew received a reward of ƒ250 from the Emperor of Germany in November 1894.

== Wreck discovery ==
In 2004 the wreck was found. Large pieces of the wreck, as well as beams of ebony and pieces of earthenware, were salvaged the same year by ship Ursus.
