= PS Lotta Bernard =

Paddle-steamer that sank on Lake Superior

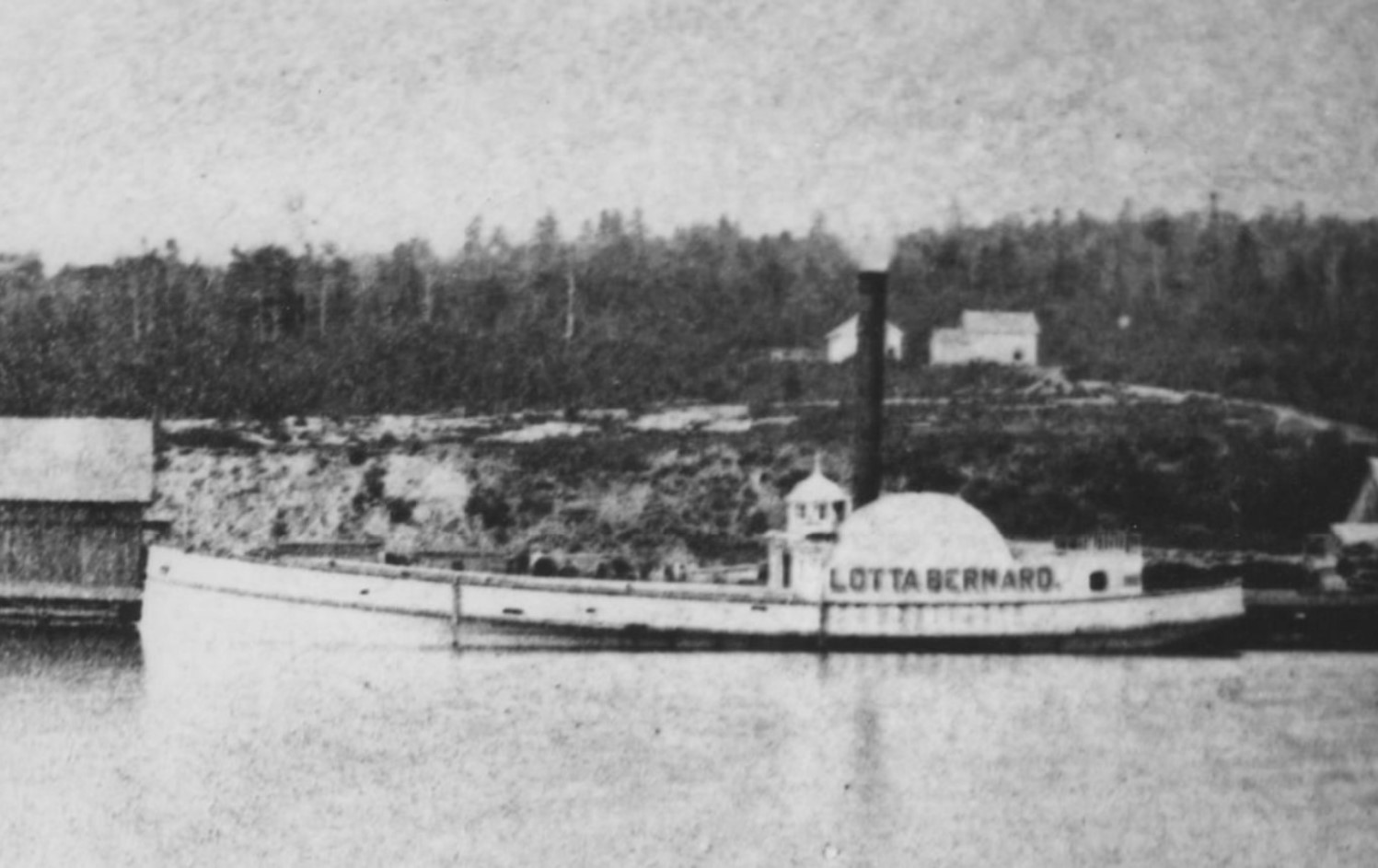
- Lotta Bernard before she sank

History

United States
- Name: Lotta Bernard
- Owner: S. W. Dorsey (1869 – 1870); Luman H. Tenney (1870 – 1871); John D. Howard (1871 – 1874)
- Operator: Northern Transportation Company (1869 – 1870)
- Port of registry: Superior, Wisconsin
- Builder: Lewis M. Jackson of Port Clinton, Ohio
- Launched: September 9, 1869
- Completed: 1869
- In service: 1869
- Out of service: October 29, 1874
- Identification: US official number 15635
- Fate: Sank on Lake Superior

General characteristics
- Class & type: Steam barge
- Tonnage: 147 GRT
- Length: 125 ft (38 m)
- Beam: 24 ft (7.3 m)
- Depth: 6.50 ft (1.98 m)
- Installed power: 1 × firebox boiler
- Propulsion: 160 hp (120 kW) crosshead steam engine

PS Lotta Bernard was a wooden-hulled sidewheel steam barge that served on the Great Lakes from her construction in 1869 to her sinking in 1874. She was built in Port Clinton, Ohio, in 1869 by Lewis M. Jackson for S.W. Dorsey of Sandusky, Ohio. When she entered service, she was chartered by the Northern Transportation Company to carry cordwood from the Portage River and Put-in-Bay to Cleveland, Ohio. In 1870, Lotta Bernard was sold to Luman H. Tenney of Duluth, Minnesota. During this time, she was contracted to haul building materials from Bark Bay, Wisconsin, to Duluth to be used in the construction of the first grain elevator in that port. Lotta Bernard was sold to John D. Howard of Superior, Wisconsin, in 1871.

On October 29, 1874, Lotta Bernard left what is now Thunder Bay, Ontario under the command of Captain Michael Norris. There were 13 crew members (including Captain Norris) and 2 passengers also on board. As she neared Encampment Island, she encountered a storm, and began taking water over the stern. As the huge waves pounded her hull, they began to smash her cabins apart, eventually leaving only the smokestack standing. Captain Norris ordered the crew to launch the lifeboats. One of the lifeboats was swamped, killing two of the people on board; one other crew member later died of exposure. The twelve remaining survivors rowed back to Duluth unharmed.

Despite the time elapsed since her sinking, the wreck of Lotta Bernard has never been found.

== History ==
=== Construction ===
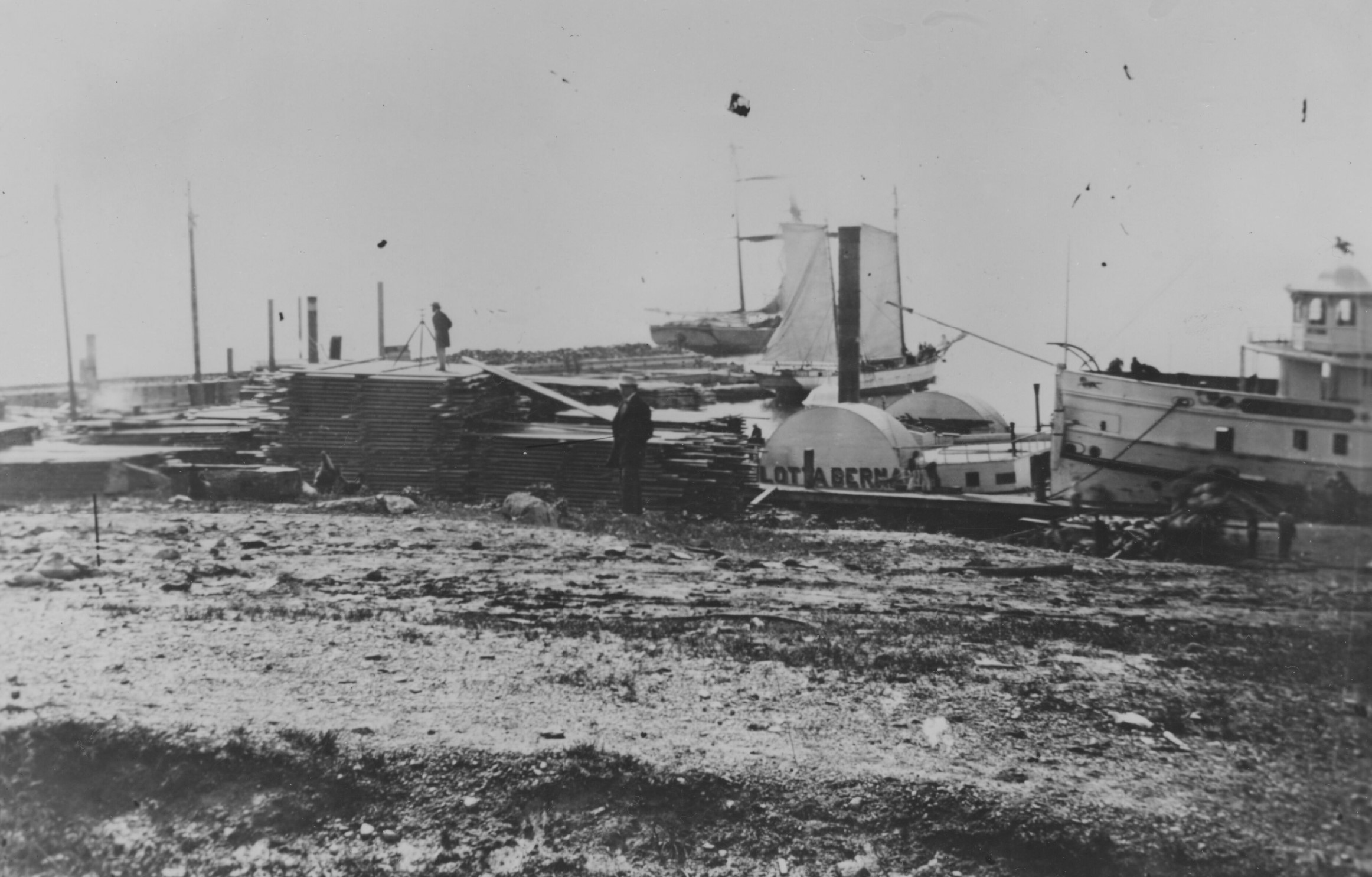
Lotta Bernard, docked beside stacks of lumber

Lotta Bernard (US official number 15635) was built in 1869 by Lewis M. Jackson of Port Clinton, Ohio. The master carpenter during her construction was Josh B. Davis. She was launched on September 9, 1869, and after her launch, she was fitted out in Sandusky, Ohio. Her wooden hull was 125 feet (38 m) (one source states 117 feet, 36 m) long, 24 feet (7.3 m) wide and 6.50 feet (1.98 m) deep. She measured 147 gross register tons (grt), and 190 tons OM.

She was equipped with a 160-horsepower (120 kW) crosshead steam engine with a piston with 22-inch (56 cm) bore and a 60-inch (150 cm) stroke, which was built by Klotz & Kramer of Sandusky. Her paddle wheels were connected by a 7-foot (2.1 m) wrought iron shaft. Steam for the engine was provided by a single 6.4-by-16-foot (2.0 m × 4.9 m) firebox boiler. Lotta Bernard was driven by two paddle wheels with a diameter of 19 feet (5.8 m) and a width of 4.5 feet (1.4 m). Her top speed was 4 miles per hour (3.5 kn; 6.4 km/h), which was considered too slow for the type of work she was used for. She was what was called a "rabbit" type steamer, which meant that all her cabins were located at the stern, and her forward decks were left open.

=== Service history ===
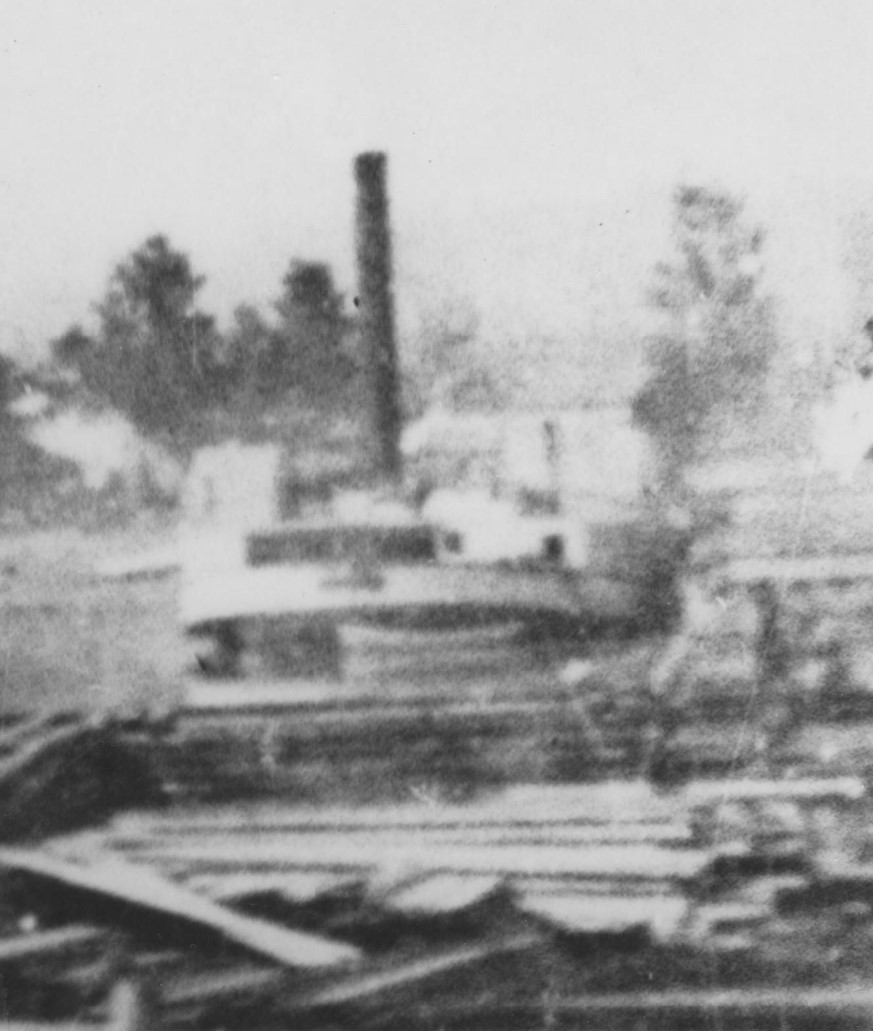
Lotta Bernard in Duluth, Minnesota during pier construction

Lotta Bernard was built for S. W. Dorsey of Sandusky, and was named after his business partner's daughter and his own son. When she entered service on November 5, 1869, she was chartered by the Northern Transportation Company to carry cordwood from the Portage River and Put-in-Bay to Cleveland, Ohio. In 1870 she was sold to Luman H. Tenney of Duluth, Minnesota. Under Tenney's ownership, she was contracted to haul building materials from Bark Bay, Wisconsin, to Duluth to be used in the construction of the first grain elevator.

In 1871 she was sold to John D. Howard of Superior, Wisconsin, and she was officially registered in Superior. Lotta Bernard carried silver from Silver Islet in May 1871. On November 17, 1871 Lotta Bernard was torn from a dock in Grand Marais, Minnesota and was blown ashore, sustaining damage to her hull, rudder, paddlewheels and her boiler. She was eventually refloated and taken to Duluth for repairs.

On November 28, 1872, while carrying a cargo of flour, feed and grain, Lotta Bernard broke her rudder chains in a snowstorm and beached near Ontonagon, Michigan. She was released for repairs in April/May 1873.

=== Final voyage ===
On October 29, 1874 Lotta Bernard left what is now Thunder Bay, Ontario under the command of Captain Michael Norris, with a cargo consisting of a horse, 200 sacks of flour and 60 kegs of fish; there were 13 crew members (including Captain Norris) and 2 passengers also on board. As she neared Encampment Island, she encountered a storm and began taking water over the stern. Huge waves pounded her hull and smashed her cabins, eventually leaving only the smokestack standing. Captain Norris ordered the pumps started to try to empty the water flowing into her hull. He also ordered Lotta Bernard's bow anchor dropped to swing her into the seas, but she continued to sink. The situation got so bad that Captain Norris ordered the crew to launch the lifeboats. One of the lifeboats which contained eight people was swamped by a wave while it was still next to the ship. Two of the people who were in the lifeboat drowned when it capsized, while the remaining six managed to make it to the other lifeboat. The survivors eventually reached land near Silver Creek, Minnesota, where Captain Norris split the 13 survivors into two groups in order to find shelter. The group of ten found a local Ojibwe camp, where they received shelter, food and got a chance to dry their soaked clothes. Meanwhile, the other group of three found the other lifeboat washed up on the shore, although one of the group died of exposure. After the storm had passed the twelve remaining survivors decided to row back to Duluth. They encountered a fishing camp near Two Harbors, Minnesota, where they received food and got a chance to get warm. Afterwards, they rowed the remaining 33 miles (53.1 km) back to Duluth. All of them made it unharmed.

Although Lotta Bernard was valued at $20,000, she was only insured for $10,000. After she sank, the Detroit Free Press described Lotta Bernard as "altogether unfit for the traffic she was employed in".

== Lotta Bernard wreck ==
The Great Lakes Shipwreck Preservation Society planned to search for her from June 27–28, 2020, and if she was not found, again from September 12–13. Both of the expeditions were cancelled in light of the COVID-19 pandemic.
