= Şevket =

Şevket is a Turkish male name with the Arabic equivalent Shawkat. People named Şevket include:

== Name ==
- Şevket Altuğ (born 1943), Turkish actor
- Şevket Çoruh (born 1973), Turkish actor
- Şevket Dağ (1876–1944), Turkish painter
- Şevket Müftügil (1917–2015), Turkish judge
- Şevket Pamuk (born 1950), Turkish economist
- Şevket Sabancı (1936–2021), Turkish businessman
- Şevket Şahintaş, Turkish photographer
- Şevket Seidametov (born 1954), Ukrainian artist
- Şevket Seyfi Düzgören (1880–1948), Ottoman and Turkish general
- Şevket Süreyya Aydemir (1897–1976), Turkish intellectual
- Shevket Turgut Pasha (1857–1924), Ottoman general
- Şevket Yorulmaz (1925–1997), Turkish footballer and coach

== Middle name ==
- Mehmed Şevket Eygi (1933–2019), Turkish journalist
- Mehmut Şevket Karman (1912–1989), Turkish alpine skier
- Mahmud Shevket Pasha (1856–1913), Ottoman general and statesman

== Surname ==
- Belkıs Sevket, first female Turkish pilot
- Şehzade Mahmud Şevket (1903–1973), Ottoman prince
- Şehzade Mehmed Şevket (1872–1899), Ottoman prince

== See also ==
- Ottoman cruiser Peyk-i Şevket
- Ottoman ironclad Asar-i Şevket
- Ottoman ironclad Necm-i Şevket
- Peyk-i Şevket-class cruiser
- Asar-i Şevket-class ironclad
