= List of ironclad warships of the Ottoman Empire =

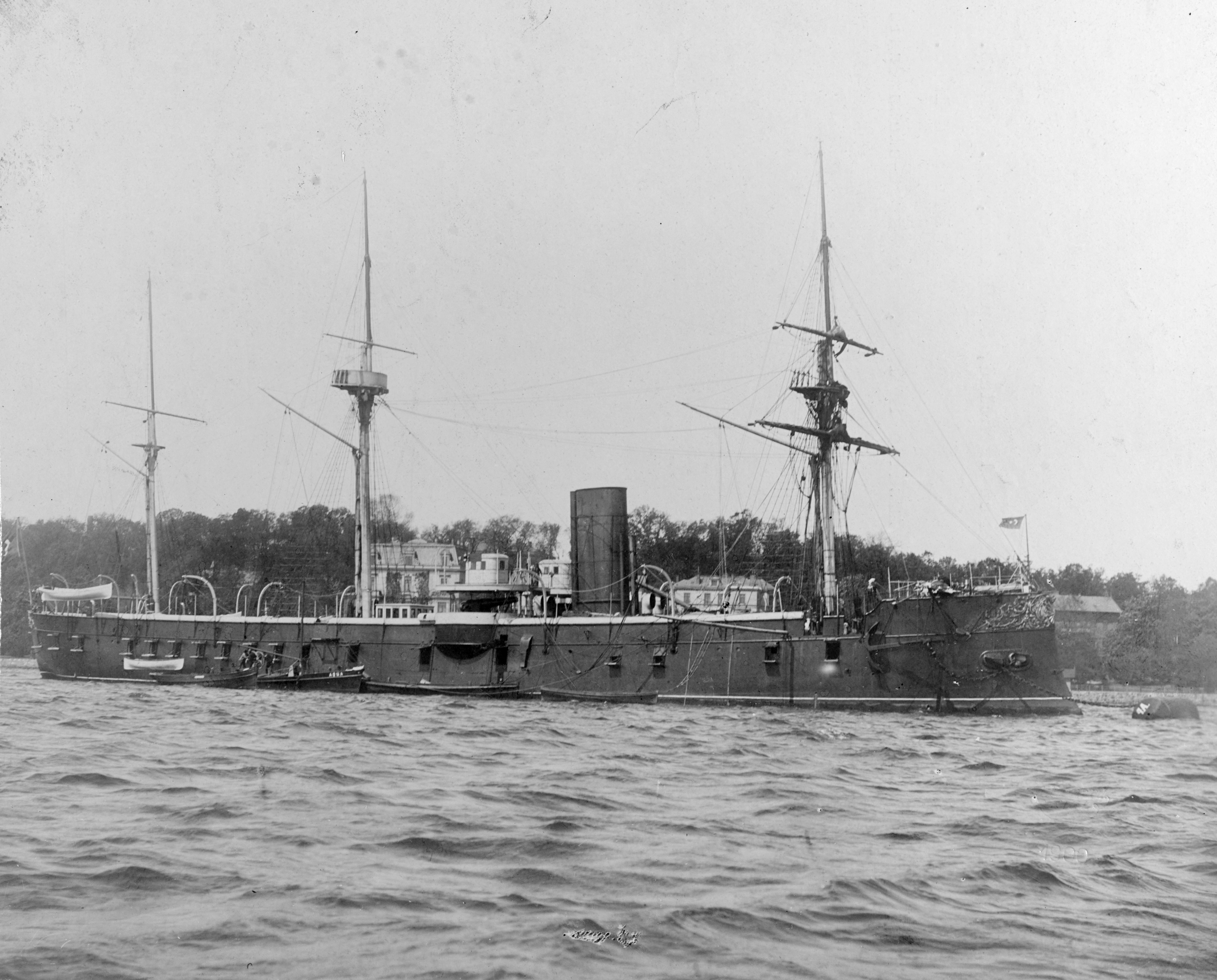
Asar-i Tevfik photographed in Kiel, in 1900

In the 1860s and 1870s, the Ottoman Navy ordered or acquired a series of ironclad warships, built almost entirely in foreign shipyards. The first class, the four Osmaniye-class ironclads, were ordered from British shipyards in the early 1860s, and a fifth ship, Fatih, was ordered in 1864; this vessel was purchased by the Prussian Navy in 1867. That year the Ottomans ordered the ironclad Feth-i Bülend and the two-ship Avnillah class, all from Britain. In the meantime, the Eyalet of Egypt, a province of the Ottoman Empire, placed orders for several ironclads from French shipyards; these included Asar-i Tevfik and the Asar-i Şevket and Lütf-ü Celil classes. They also awarded the contract for Iclaliye to an Austro-Hungarian firm. Egyptian efforts to assert their independence angered Sultan Abdülaziz, who demanded Egypt surrender all of the ironclads it had ordered, which it did in 1868. By this time, a second Feth-i Bülend-class ironclad had been ordered; this ship, Mukaddeme-i Hayir, was the first ironclad built in the Ottoman Imperial Arsenal. In 1871, the Ottomans ordered two Mesudiye-class ironclads from Britain, the second of which was purchased by the Royal Navy in 1878 in the midst of a war scare with Russia, and laid down a third vessel, Hamidiye, at the Imperial Arsenal. Two final ships, the Peyk-i Şeref class, were ordered from Britain in 1874, but the Royal Navy bought both vessels during the 1878 war scare.

Most of the Ottoman ironclads saw action during the Russo-Turkish War of 1877–1878, with the exception of the four Osmaniyes, which the Ottoman command considered too large and too valuable to risk. The rest of the ships served in the Black Sea, where they supported Ottoman forces in the Caucasus and in the eastern Balkans. One vessel, Lütf-ü Celil, was sunk by Russian artillery while patrolling the Danube. The Ottoman fleet was laid up from the end of the war until 1897, when the government attempted to mobilize the ships during the Greco-Turkish War. After two decades of neglect, most of the ships were found to be unseaworthy, and those vessels that could put to sea were operated by untrained crews who could not effectively operate them. The navy embarked on a major reconstruction program aimed at modernizing the ironclads over the following decade, and many of the vessels were rebuilt or broken up.

Despite having been recently modernized, the Ottoman fleet was in no condition to challenge the powerful Italian fleet during the Italo-Turkish War of 1911–1912, and the bulk of the Ottoman fleet remained in port. Italian cruisers sank one rebuilt ironclad, Avnillah, in the Battle of Beirut. In the First Balkan War, which broke out before the war with Italy ended, a Greek torpedo boat sank Feth-i Bülend in Salonika. In 1913, Asar-i Tevfik ran aground off the coast of Bulgaria; wave action coupled with Bulgarian artillery fire destroyed the ship. Mesudiye took part in two major naval actions against the Greek fleet, the Battle of Elli in December 1912 and the Battle of Lemnos in January 1913, both of which were Ottoman defeats. By the outbreak of World War I in 1914, only Mesudiye served in an active capacity; the other surviving vessels had been reduced to secondary roles like training ships and floating barracks. In December 1914, Mesudiye was sunk by a British submarine in the Dardanelles. After the chaos of the Greco-Turkish War of 1919–1922 subsided, the fleet discarded the ironclads remaining in inventory. The last vessel, Muin-i Zafer, which had been converted into a depot ship for submarines, was scrapped in 1932.

Key
Armament	The number and type of the primary armament
Armor	The maximum thickness of the armored belt
Displacement	Ship displacement at full combat load
Propulsion	Number of shafts, type of propulsion system, and top speed and horsepower generated
Service	The dates work began and finished on the ship and its ultimate fate
Laid down	The date the keel assembly commenced
Commissioned	The date the ship was commissioned into service

== Osmaniye class ==
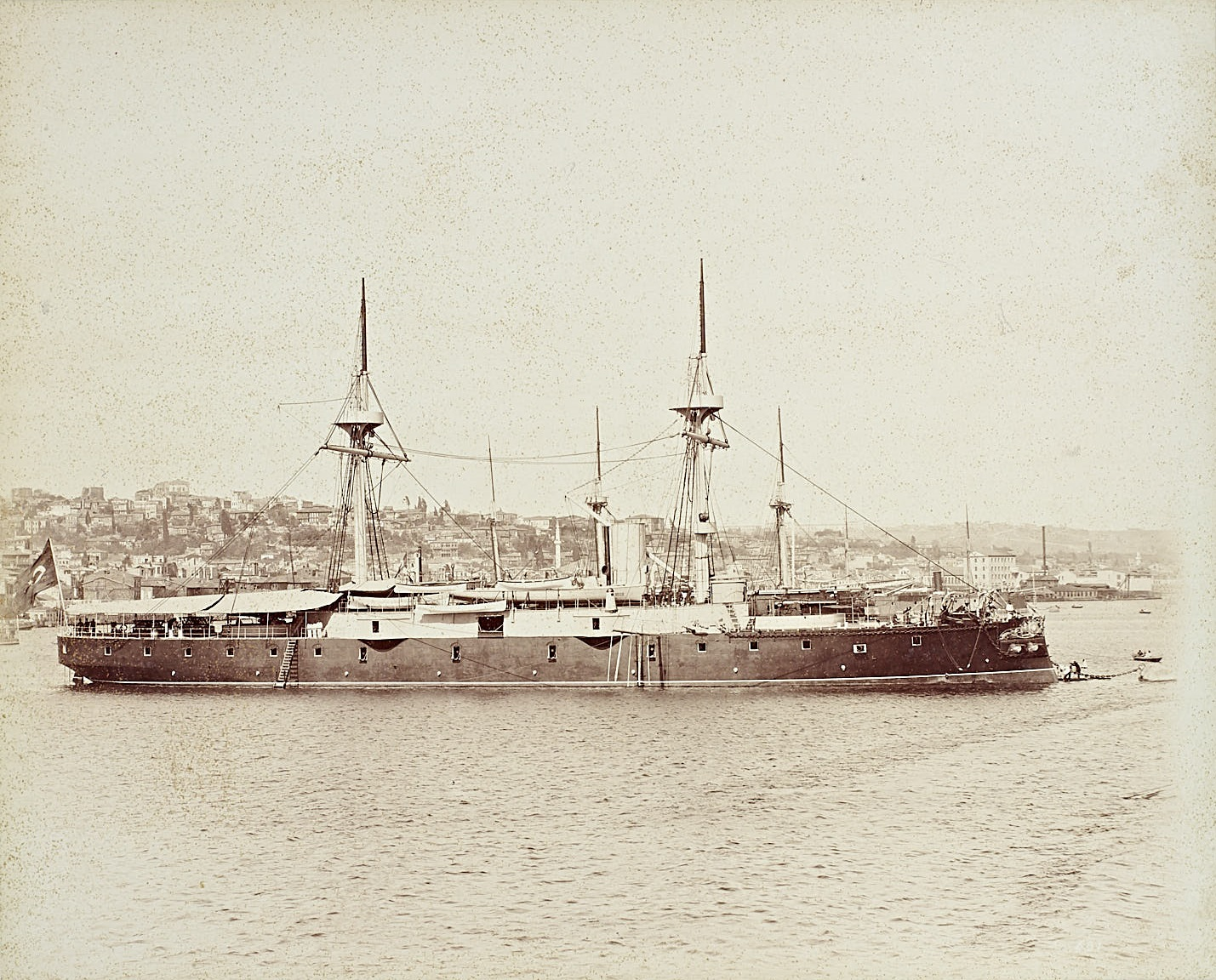
Lead ship of the class, Osmaniye, in the Golden Horn

The Osmaniye class was the first group of ironclads ordered by the Ottoman government, part of a naval construction program to replace the heavy losses sustained during the Crimean War of 1853–1856. The contracts were placed with British and French shipyards, with the four Osmaniye-class ships being ordered from Britain. They were broadside ironclads, mounting their battery of guns in traditional gun decks along the sides of the hull, which was typical for the first generation of ironclads built in the early 1860s. They were the largest ironclads of the Ottoman fleet until Mesudiye was completed a decade later in 1875. As the largest and most valuable members of the Ottoman fleet, the Osmaniye class was kept safely in the Mediterranean Sea during the Russo-Turkish War of 1877–1878, because the Ottoman command did not want to risk them in coastal operations in the Black Sea.

The four ships were reduced to reserve status in Constantinople after the war, with the rest of the Ottoman fleet. The four ships were heavily rebuilt in the early 1890s, being converted into more modern barbette ships. Nevertheless, they were in poor condition by the outbreak of the Greco-Turkish War in February 1897, with many of their guns damaged or incomplete. Training exercises conducted in May highlighted the very low standard of training of their crews, and reinforced the decision not to confront the Greek Navy at sea. All four ships were disarmed after the war and laid up, before being decommissioned in 1909. Aziziye, Orhaniye, and Mahmudiye were briefly used as barracks ships; the latter two were sold for scrap in 1913, and Aziziye and Osmaniye followed them to the ship breakers in 1923.

Ship	Armament	Armor	Displacement	Propulsion	Service		
Ship	Armament	Armor	Displacement	Propulsion	Laid down	Commissioned	Fate
Osmaniye	1 × 229 mm (9 in) Armstrong gun 14 × 203 mm (8 in) Armstrong guns 10 × 36-pounder guns	140 mm (5.5 in)	6,400 t (6,300 long tons)	1 shaft 1 compound steam engine 13.5 knots (25.0 km/h; 15.5 mph)	March 1863	November 1865	Broken up, 1923
Aziziye	1 × 229 mm (9 in) Armstrong gun 14 × 203 mm (8 in) Armstrong guns 10 × 36-pounder guns	140 mm (5.5 in)	6,400 t (6,300 long tons)	1 shaft 1 compound steam engine 13.5 knots (25.0 km/h; 15.5 mph)	May 1863	August 1865	Broken up, 1923
Orhaniye	1 × 229 mm (9 in) Armstrong gun 14 × 203 mm (8 in) Armstrong guns 10 × 36-pounder guns	140 mm (5.5 in)	6,400 t (6,300 long tons)	1 shaft 1 compound steam engine 13.5 knots (25.0 km/h; 15.5 mph)	1863	1866	Broken up, 1913
Mahmudiye	1 × 229 mm (9 in) Armstrong gun 14 × 203 mm (8 in) Armstrong guns 10 × 36-pounder guns	140 mm (5.5 in)	6,400 t (6,300 long tons)	1 shaft 1 compound steam engine 13.5 knots (25.0 km/h; 15.5 mph)	1864	1866	Broken up, 1913

== Fatih ==
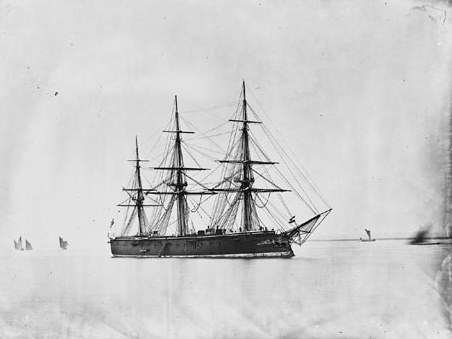
Fatih, in Prussian service as König Wilhelm

Fatih was laid down at the Thames Ironworks shipyard in London, England, in 1865, originally ordered by the Ottoman Empire. The ship was built to a design created by the British naval architect Edward Reed. Before the ship's launch, the Ottomans determined they could not afford the large and expensive ironclad, and so they sold the unfinished vessel to the Prussian Navy on 6 February 1867; she was initially renamed Wilhelm I, and on 14 December 1867, the ship was renamed again, as König Wilhelm. The ship had an uneventful career in the Prussian and Imperial Navies, seeing little action during the Franco-Prussian War in 1870–1871. She was involved in an accidental collision with the ironclad Grosser Kurfürst in 1878, which saw the sinking of the latter vessel. König Wilhelm was rebuilt as an armored cruiser in the mid-1890s, and continued to serve with the fleet until 1904, when she was withdrawn for subsidiary duties, including serving as a barracks ship and a training ship. She continued as a training vessel until after World War I, ultimately being stricken from the naval register on 4 January 1921 and broken up thereafter.

Ship	Armament	Armor	Displacement	Propulsion	Service		
Ship	Armament	Armor	Displacement	Propulsion	Laid down	Commissioned	Fate
Fatih	33 × 72-pounder rifled guns	305 mm (12 in)	10,761 t (10,591 long tons)	1 shaft 1 compound steam engine 14.7 knots (27.2 km/h; 16.9 mph)	1865	20 February 1869, as SMS König Wilhelm	Broken up, 1921

== Fettah ==
Fettah was ordered from the Imperial Arsenal in 1864, to be built along the same lines as the Osmaniye class. The ship was to have been the same size, with the same armament, though she would have incorporated Ottoman-built machinery, which would have reduced her top speed by a knot and a half. Work never began on the ship, and she was formally cancelled on 24 April 1865.

Ship	Armament	Armor	Displacement	Propulsion	Service		
Ship	Armament	Armor	Displacement	Propulsion	Laid down	Commissioned	Fate
Fettah	1 × 229 mm Armstrong gun 14 × 203 mm Armstrong guns 10 × 36-pounder guns	Unknown	6,400 t	1 shaft 1 compound steam engine 12 knots (22 km/h; 14 mph)	—	—	—

== Asar-i Tevfik ==
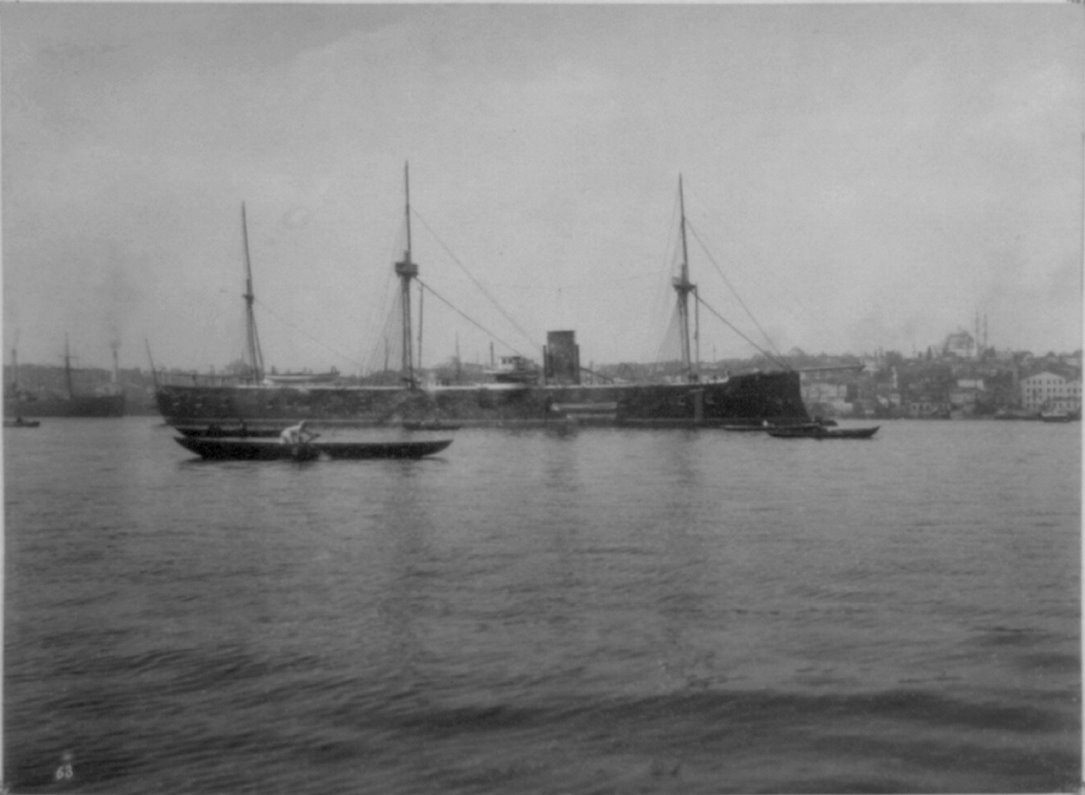
Asar-i Tevfik as originally built

In the early 1860s, the Eyalet of Egypt, a province of the Ottoman Empire, ordered several ironclad warships for its fleet as part of a rearmament program to challenge the power of the central government for the first time since the Second Egyptian–Ottoman War, twenty years earlier. The first of these ships was the casemate ship Asar-i Tevfik. Built by the Société Nouvelle des Forges et Chantiers de la Méditerranée shipyard in La Seyne, Asar-i Tevfik was based on the contemporary French ironclads of the Colbert class, though significantly reduced in size. She was the first Ottoman ironclad to discard the traditional broadside arrangement for her main battery. Instead, she carried her main armament amidships, with six guns in a central, armored casemate and two atop the casemate in revolving barbette mounts side by side in sponsons.

Like the rest of the Ottoman ironclad fleet, Asar-i Tevfik had a long and largely uneventful career. She saw limited action during the Russo-Turkish War, during which she was attacked but only slightly damaged by a Russian torpedo boat. She was laid up for the next two decades, and was in poor condition by the outbreak of the Greco-Turkish War in 1897, which prompted a radical reconstruction of the vessel in Germany after the war. Her battery of old muzzle-loading guns was replaced with new, medium-caliber breech-loaders, and she received additional armor protection and an entirely new propulsion system. During the Italo-Turkish War of 1911–1912, the Ottoman fleet was kept in port to protect it from the powerful Italian fleet. Asar-i Tevfik saw action during the First Balkan War in 1912 and 1913, including the inconclusive Battle of Elli in December 1912. Starting in early 1913, Asar-i Tevfik transferred to the Black Sea to support Ottoman forces fighting the Bulgarian Army, and on 8 February she ran aground while conducting a bombardment. A combination of Bulgarian artillery fire and heavy seas destroyed the stranded vessel.

Ship	Armament	Armor	Displacement	Propulsion	Service		
Ship	Armament	Armor	Displacement	Propulsion	Laid down	Commissioned	Fate
Asar-i Tevfik	8 × 220 mm (9 in) guns	200 mm (7.9 in)	4,687 t (4,613 long tons)	1 shaft 1 compound steam engine 13 knots (24 km/h; 15 mph)	1867	1870	Wrecked off Çernes, 11 February 1913

== Asar-i Şevket class ==
Line-drawing of the Asar-i Şevket class

The Asar-i Şevket class was also ordered by Egypt, and the design was based on the preceding Asar-i Tevfik, albeit significantly reduced in size. They displaced less than half as much as the earlier vessel and carried a significantly lighter armament of four guns in the casemate and a single barbette gun, though this was on the centerline, affording it nearly the same firing arc as the two sponsoned guns aboard Asar-i Tevfik. Like the rest of the ironclads that Egypt attempted to purchase in the 1860s, both vessels were seized by the central government in 1868, before either vessel had been completed.

The two ships saw action during the Russo-Turkish War, supporting Ottoman army operations in the Caucasus, before being laid up from the late 1870s until 1897. Like the rest of the Ottoman fleet, both ships were in poor condition and were unable to be used offensively. Asar-i Şevket was decommissioned and sold for scrap in the 1900s but Necm-i Şevket lingered on in service, primarily as a barracks ship until 1929. During this period, she briefly saw action again during the First Balkan War, when she provided fire support to beleaguered Ottoman defenders protecting Constantinople from the Bulgarian Army. She was finally decommissioned in 1929 and broken up.

Ship	Armament	Armor	Displacement	Propulsion	Service		
Ship	Armament	Armor	Displacement	Propulsion	Laid down	Commissioned	Fate
Asar-i Şevket	1 × 229 mm (9 in) Armstrong gun 4 × 178 mm (7 in) Armstrong guns	152 mm (6 in)	2,047 t (2,015 long tons)	1 shaft 1 compound steam engine 12 knots (22 km/h; 14 mph)	1867	3 March 1870	Broken up, 1909
Necm-i Şevket	1 × 229 mm (9 in) Armstrong gun 4 × 178 mm (7 in) Armstrong guns	152 mm (6 in)	2,047 t (2,015 long tons)	1 shaft 1 compound steam engine 12 knots (22 km/h; 14 mph)	1867	3 March 1870	Broken up, 1929

== Lütf-ü Celil class ==
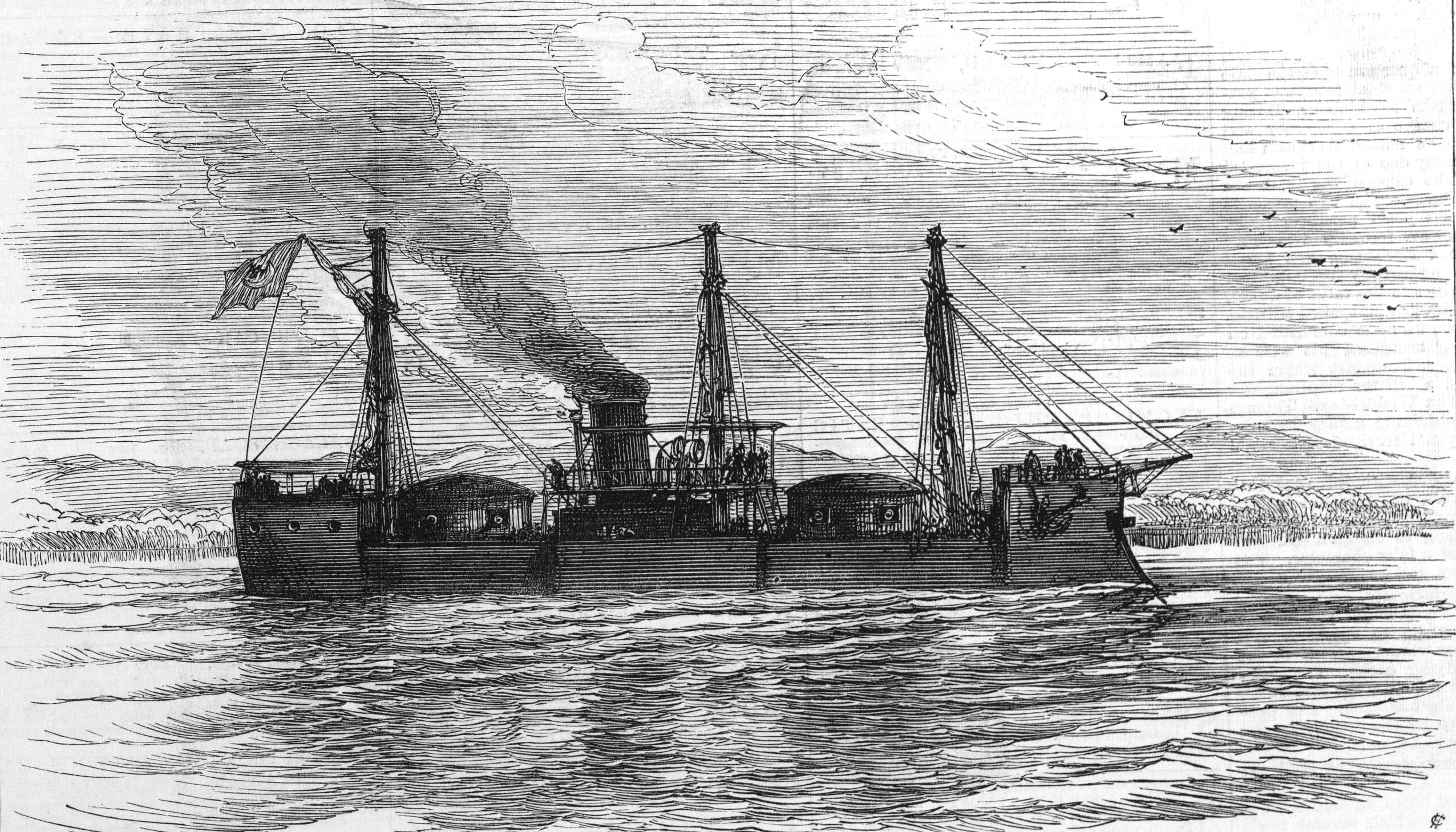
Illustration of Lütf-ü Celil

Egypt also ordered a pair of sea-going monitors, the Lütf-ü Celil class, the only vessels of that type built for the Ottoman Navy. They carried their main battery in a pair of revolving gun turrets, which were mounted on the centerline. Their firing arcs were restricted by large forecastles and sterncastles that were necessary to provide the freeboard required to operate at sea. Though they had one fewer gun than the Asar-i Şevket-class casemate ships, their turrets allowed them to fire all four guns to either side, compared to only three per broadside for the casemate ships.

Both vessels saw action during the Russo-Turkish War of 1877–1878, in which Lütf-ü Celil was sunk by a Russian artillery battery on the Danube. Hifz-ur Rahman engaged Russian minelayers at the mouth of the Danube but otherwise saw little action. She survived the war and was laid up for the following twenty years, like the rest of the ironclad fleet. She was mobilized at the outbreak of the Greco-Turkish War in 1897 but was in poor condition, and she saw no action as a result. The ship was eventually sold in 1909 and broken up.

Ship	Armament	Armor	Displacement	Propulsion	Service		
Ship	Armament	Armor	Displacement	Propulsion	Laid down	Commissioned	Fate
Lütf-ü Celil	2 × 225 mm (8.9 in) Armstrong guns 2 × 178 mm Armstrong guns	140 mm (5.5 in)	2,540 t (2,500 long tons)	1 shaft 1 compound steam engine 12 knots	1868	March 1870	Sunk by Russian artillery, 11 May 1877
Hifz-ur Rahman	2 × 225 mm (8.9 in) Armstrong guns 2 × 178 mm Armstrong guns	140 mm (5.5 in)	2,540 t (2,500 long tons)	1 shaft 1 compound steam engine 12 knots	1868	March 1870	Broken up, 1909

== Avnillah class ==
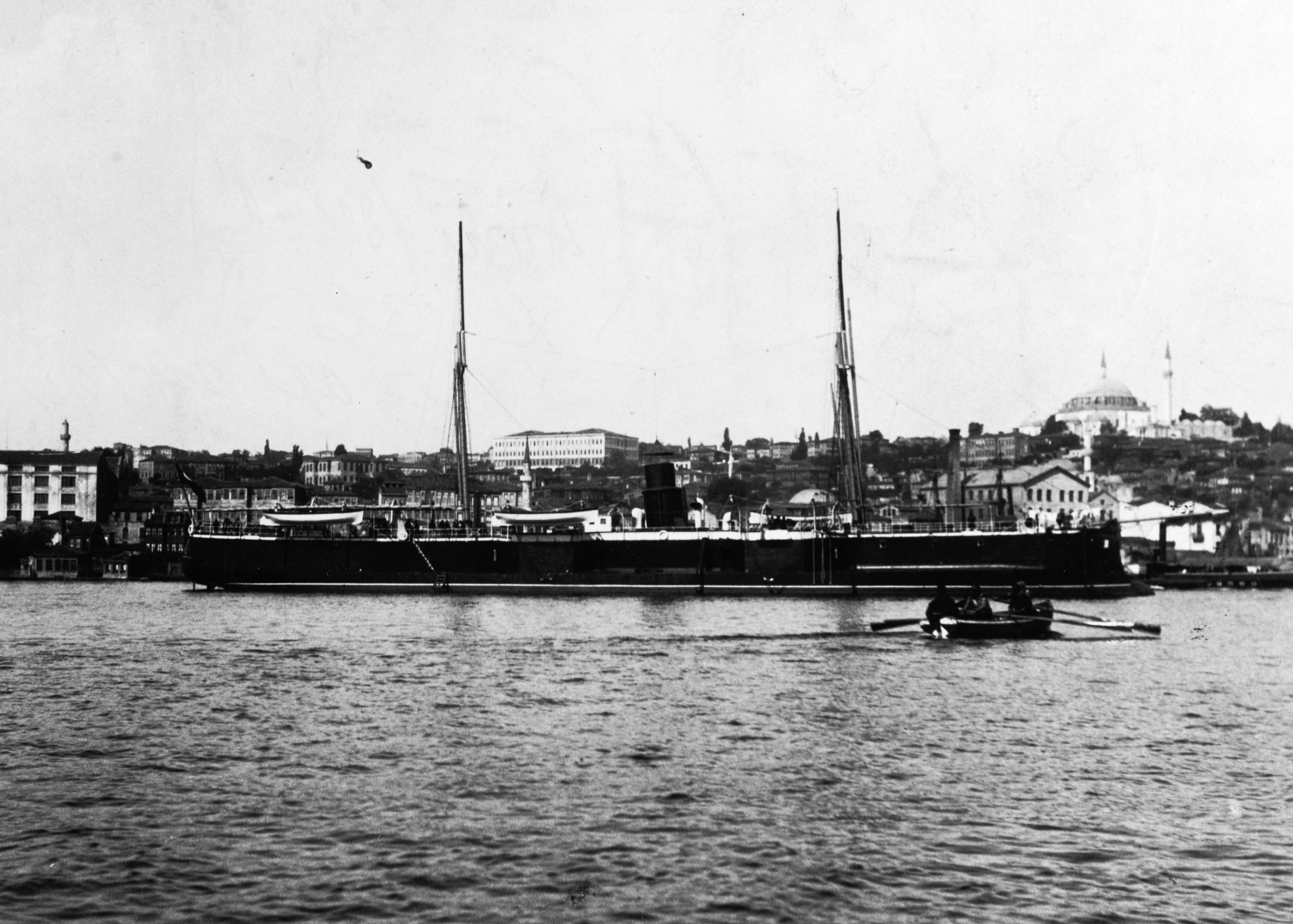
Avnillah, c. 1885

Unlike most of the ironclads that served in the Ottoman fleet, the two Avnillah-class ships were actually ordered by the central government as part of its own reconstruction program. They were casemate ships, and the casemates were arranged in such a way as to permit the forward pair to fire directly ahead and the aft pair to fire directly astern. Each casemate also had a second firing port for each gun, greatly enhancing their fields of fire. The two ships had early careers similar to the rest of the fleet, seeing limited action against Russia in 1877–1878 and no substantial activity until 1897, when the navy discovered that neither ship was fit for wartime service.

The two ships were rebuilt by Gio. Ansaldo & C. between 1903 and 1906 at the Ottoman Imperial Arsenal, which was in part leased to Ansaldo to cover the cost of their reconstruction. Now armed with a battery of four quick-firing 150 mm (5.9 in) Krupp 40-caliber guns, they were employed as guard ships. It was in this capacity that Avnillah was attacked and sunk at the Battle of Beirut in 1912 by a pair of Italian armored cruisers. Muin-i Zafer was disarmed to reinforce the defenses of Port Said during the Italo-Turkish War. She served in a variety of subsidiary roles after 1913, including as a training vessel, a barracks ship, and ultimately as a depot ship for submarines. In 1932, she was finally decommissioned and broken up for scrap.

Ship	Armament	Armor	Displacement	Propulsion	Service		
Ship	Armament	Armor	Displacement	Propulsion	Laid down	Commissioned	Fate
Avnillah	4 × 228 mm (9 in) guns	152 mm	2,362 t (2,325 long tons)	1 shaft 1 compound steam engine 12 knots	1868	1870	Sunk in the Battle of Beirut, 24 February 1912
Muin-i Zafer	4 × 228 mm (9 in) guns	152 mm	2,362 t (2,325 long tons)	1 shaft 1 compound steam engine 12 knots	1868	1870	Broken up, 1932

== Feth-i Bülend class ==
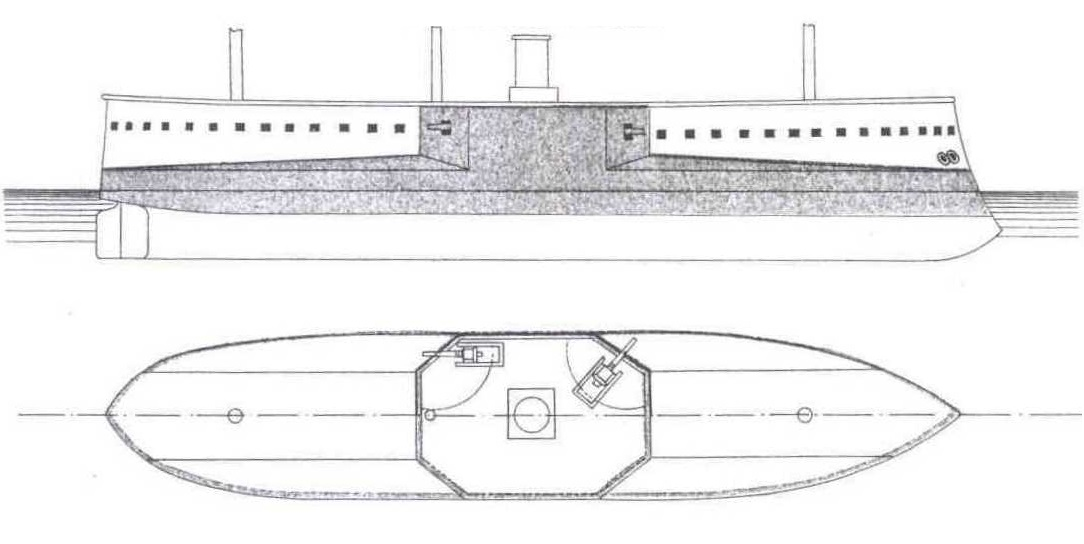
Line-drawing of the Feth-i Bülend class

The Ottoman government ordered Feth-i Bülend from Britain in 1867, with a design based on the Avnillah-class ironclads, though with a simplified casemate to house the main battery. An octagonal casemate with a single firing port per gun was adopted, which still allowed for two guns ahead or astern. In addition, the simpler casemate design permitted the use of heavier armor with a modest increase in displacement. In 1868, the Ottomans ordered a second vessel, Mukaddeme-i Hayir, to be built by the Imperial Arsenal. The ships were completed in 1870 and 1874, respectively, and were rapidly made obsolescent by developments in naval artillery and armor plate.

The two ships saw service during the Russo-Turkish War, primarily in the Caucasus campaign, though Feth-i Bülend engaged a Russian armed steamer in an inconclusive engagement. Mukaddeme-i Hayir also saw action off the Danube against Russian minelayers. Like the rest of the Ottoman fleet, the two ships were laid up until 1897; Feth-i Bülend was reconstructed after the Greco-Turkish War but Mukaddeme-i Hayir was in too poor a condition to merit rebuilding. Feth-i Bülend served as a guard ship in Salonika during the Italo-Turkish War and saw no action, but at the outbreak of the First Balkan War in October 1912, a Greek torpedo boat entered the harbor and torpedoed the ship, sinking her. Mukaddeme-i Hayir, meanwhile, served as a training ship and later as a barracks ship until 1923, when she was discarded.

Ship	Armament	Armor	Displacement	Propulsion	Service		
Ship	Armament	Armor	Displacement	Propulsion	Laid down	Commissioned	Fate
Feth-i Bülend	4 × 229 mm guns	229 mm	2,762 t (2,718 long tons)	1 shaft 1 compound steam engine 13 knots	May 1868	1870	Sunk by Greek torpedo boat, 31 October 1912
Mukaddeme-i Hayir	4 × 229 mm guns	229 mm	2,762 t (2,718 long tons)	1 shaft 1 compound steam engine 13 knots	1870	1874	Broken up, 1923

== Iclaliye ==
Iclaliye was the last vessel ordered by the Egyptian Eyalet; unlike the rest of the ships Egypt attempted to acquire, she was ordered from an Austro-Hungarian shipyard. Her design was based on the Asar-i Şevket class, with a slightly more powerful gun armament, trading one of the 178 mm guns for an additional 228 mm gun. Along with the rest of the smaller Ottoman ironclads, Iclaliye saw action in the Black Sea during the Russo-Turkish War, supporting the Ottoman army in the Caucasus. She remained inactive for the next two decades, though she was modernized in 1885, receiving a new armament of Krupp guns. Iclaliye was not rebuilt after the Greco-Turkish War and she was instead placed in reserve. During the First Balkan War, she was reactivated to provide gunfire support to the beleaguered Ottoman defenders at Çatalca, though she remained in service only briefly. She served as a barracks ship from 1914 to 1919, then as a training ship until 1923, when she again became a barracks ship. Iclaliye was ultimately discarded in 1928.

Ship	Armament	Armor	Displacement	Propulsion	Service		
Ship	Armament	Armor	Displacement	Propulsion	Laid down	Commissioned	Fate
Iclaliye	2 × 228 mm Armstrong guns 3 × 178 mm Armstrong guns	152 mm	2,228 t (2,193 long tons)	1 shaft 1 compound steam engine 12 knots	May 1868	February 1871	Broken up, 1928

== Mesudiye class ==
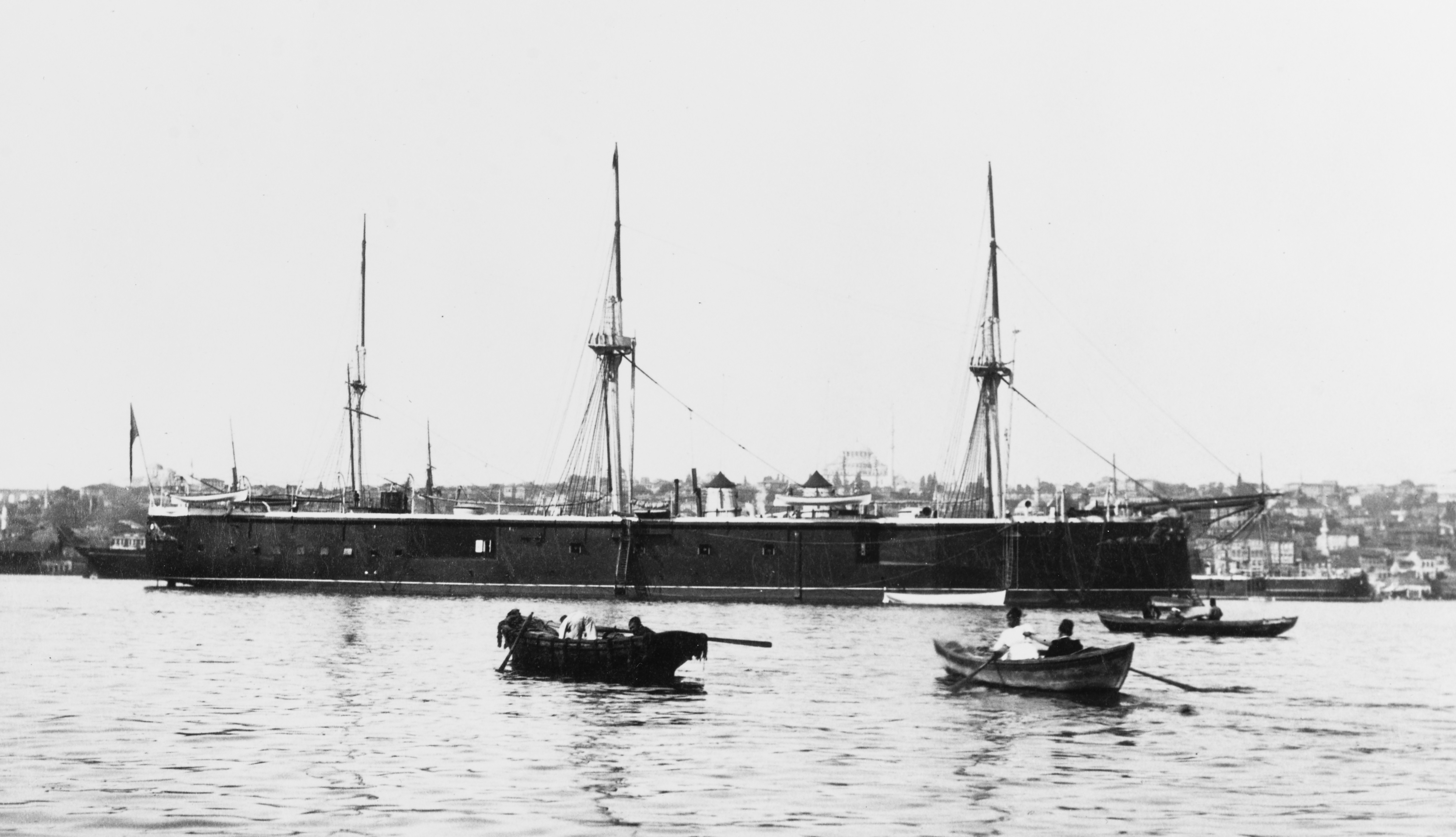
Mesudiye sometime before 1894

Mesudiye and Hamidiye were ordered in the 1870s from Britain; the design for the ships was prepared by Edward Reed, who based the design for the ships on the recently built HMS Hercules. The Mesudiye-class ships carried their armament in a central casemate, with two guns firing forward, four guns per broadside, and two firing astern. While Hamidiye was still under construction, the Royal Navy purchased the ship as a result of a war scare with Russia and renamed her HMS Superb. The two ships were the largest casemate-type ironclads ever built, and Mesudiye was the largest vessel of the Ottoman fleet for much of her career.

Mesudiye became the flagship of the Ottoman naval forces in the Black Sea during the Russo-Turkish War, but she saw no action. Like the rest of the fleet, she was in poor condition by the outbreak of the Greco-Turkish War, and she was accordingly modernized in the aftermath. Gio. Ansaldo & C. rebuilt the vessel into a pre-dreadnought type vessel, though she never received her intended new main battery of two 230 mm (9.1 in) guns. During the Italo-Turkish War, she remained inactive with the rest of the fleet, safely behind the fortifications of the Dardanelles, but she saw action during the First Balkan War at the battles of Elli and Lemnos. During the latter engagement, damage sustained forced her to retreat. She continued on in service during World War I, acting as a guard ship to protect the minefields laid to block the entrances to the Dardanelles, and it was in this role that she was torpedoed and sunk by the British submarine B11 on 13 December 1914.

Ship	Armament	Armor	Displacement	Propulsion	Service		
Ship	Armament	Armor	Displacement	Propulsion	Laid down	Commissioned	Fate
Mesudiye	12 × RML 254 mm (10 in) 18-ton guns 3 × RML 178 mm (7 in) guns	305 mm	8,938 t (8,797 long tons)	1 shaft 1 compound steam engine 13.7 knots (25.4 km/h; 15.8 mph)	1872	December 1875	Sunk by British submarine, 13 December 1914
Hamidiye	16 × RML 10 in 18-ton guns	305 mm	8,938 t (8,797 long tons)	1 shaft 1 compound steam engine 13.2 knots (24.4 km/h; 15.2 mph)	1873	15 November 1880, as HMS Superb	Broken up, 1906

== Hamidiye ==
Hamidiye was the last ironclad warship to be completed for the Ottoman Navy, and one of the few such vessels to be built at the Imperial Arsenal in Constantinople. Her design was based on the British-built Mesudiye, though on a reduced scale. She proved to be an unsatisfactory ship, the result of her very lengthy construction period—some twenty years long—that left her hopelessly obsolete by the time she entered service. The ship had significant design faults, including low-quality armor and poor handling characteristics. She accordingly spent much of her career as a stationary training ship. Just three years after entering service, she was determined to be completely unfit for combat during the Greco-Turkish War. The Ottoman government considered rebuilding the ship as part of its reconstruction program that modernized several of the other ironclads in the early 1900s, but the proposal was abandoned in 1903 owing to Hamidiye's poor condition. She was ultimately stricken in 1909 and broken up for scrap in 1913.

Ship	Armament	Armor	Displacement	Propulsion	Service		
Ship	Armament	Armor	Displacement	Propulsion	Laid down	Commissioned	Fate
Hamidiye	4 × 228 mm Armstrong guns 4 × 150 mm (5.9 in) Krupp guns	229 mm	6,594 t (6,490 long tons)	1 shaft 1 compound steam engine 13 knots	December 1874	1894	Broken up, 1913

== Peyk-i Şeref class ==
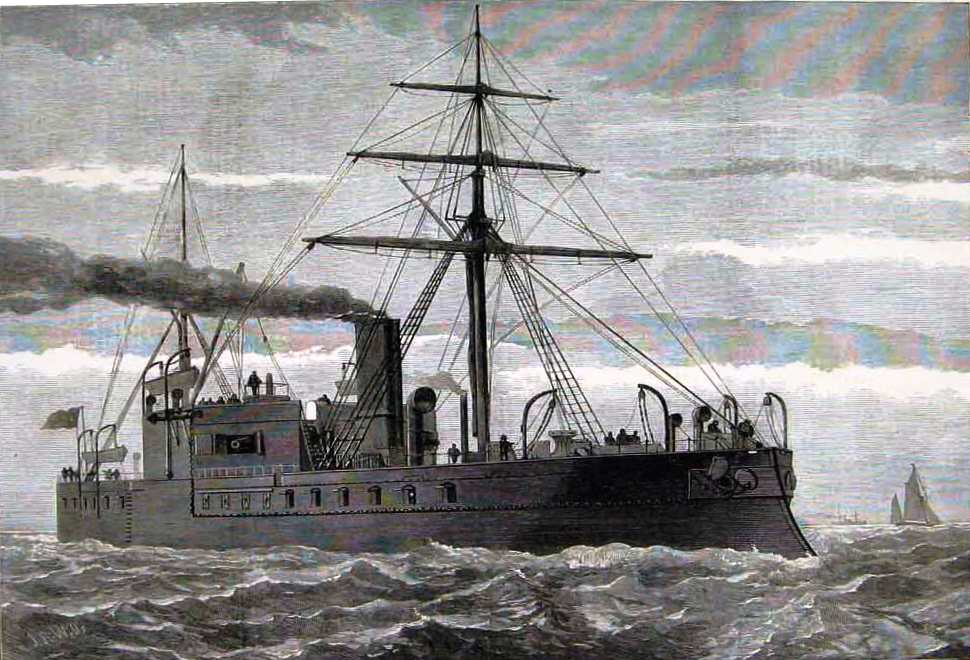
Illustration of Peyk-i Şeref, had she been completed for the Ottoman Navy

Though Hamidiye was the last Ottoman ironclad to be built, she was not the last vessel of the type to be ordered; the Ottoman government placed an order for a pair of armored rams from the British shipbuilder Samuda Brothers in 1874. The ships carried a battery of four 305 mm guns in an armored casemate atop the main deck, though their primary offensive weapon was their ram bow. These two ships, intended to be used in the eastern Mediterranean, were purchased by the Royal Navy in 1878 while still under construction; Peyk-i Şeref and Büruç-u Zafer were renamed Belleisle and Orion, respectively. Since they had been designed to operate in the relatively calm Mediterranean, they were unsuitable for use on the high seas, and so they were employed as coastal defense ships in British service. Belleisle was ultimately scrapped in 1904 and Orion was broken up in 1913.

Ship	Armament	Armor	Displacement	Propulsion	Service		
Ship	Armament	Armor	Displacement	Propulsion	Laid down	Commissioned	Fate
Peyk-i Şeref	4 × RML 305 mm 25-ton guns	305 mm	4,870 t (4,790 long tons)	2 shafts 1 compound steam engine 12.99 knots (24.06 km/h; 14.95 mph)	1874	19 July 1878, as HMS Belleisle	Broken up, 1904
Büruç-u Zafer	4 × RML 305 mm 25-ton guns	305 mm	4,870 t (4,790 long tons)	2 shafts 1 compound steam engine 12.99 knots (24.06 km/h; 14.95 mph)	Unknown	3 July 1882, as HMS Orion	Broken up, 1913

== See also ==
- List of ironclads
- List of battleships of the Ottoman Empire
