= Ottoman ironclad Asar-i Şevket =

Ironclad warship of the Ottoman Navy

- Line-drawing of the Asar-i Şevket class

History

Ottoman Empire
- Name: Asar-i Şevket
- Namesake: "Work of God"
- Ordered: 1866
- Builder: Forges et Chantiers de la Gironde
- Laid down: 1867
- Launched: 1868
- Commissioned: 3 March 1870
- Decommissioned: 1903
- Fate: Sold for scrap, 31 July 1909

General characteristics
- Class & type: Asar-i Şevket-class ironclad
- Displacement: 2,047 metric tons (2,015 long tons; 2,256 short tons)
- Length: 66.4 m (217 ft 10 in) (loa)
- Beam: 12.9 m (42 ft 4 in)
- Draft: 5 m (16 ft 5 in)
- Installed power: 4 × box boilers; 1,750 ihp (1,300 kW)
- Propulsion: 1 × compound steam engine; 1 × screw propeller
- Speed: 12 knots (22 km/h; 14 mph)
- Complement: 170
- Armament: 1 × 229 mm (9 in) Armstrong gun; 4 × 178 mm (7 in) Armstrong guns
- Armor: Belt: 152 mm (6 in); Battery: 114 mm (4.5 in); Barbette: 114 mm

Asar-i Şevket (Ottoman Turkish: Work of God) was a central battery ship built for the Ottoman Navy in the 1860s. Originally ordered by the Eyalet of Egypt but confiscated by the Ottoman Empire while under construction, the vessel was initially named Kahira. The ship was laid down at the French Forges et Chantiers de la Gironde shipyard in 1867, was launched in 1868, and was commissioned into the Ottoman fleet in March 1870. Asar-i Şevket was armed with a battery of four 178 mm (7 in) Armstrong guns in a central casemate and one 229 mm (9 in) Armstrong gun in a revolving barbette.

The ship saw action in the Russo-Turkish War in 1877–1878, where she supported Ottoman forces in the Caucasus, and later helped to defend the port of Sulina on the Danube. She was laid up for twenty years, until the outbreak of the Greco-Turkish War in 1897, which highlighted the badly deteriorated state of the Ottoman fleet. Asar-i Şevket was not included in the major reconstruction program that saw most of the other ironclads rebuilt after the war, and she was decommissioned in 1903 and broken up for scrap in 1909.

== Design ==
Asar-i Şevket was 66.4 m (217 ft 10 in) long overall, with a beam of 12.9 m (42 ft 4 in) and a draft of 5 m (16 ft 5 in). The hull was constructed with iron, incorporated a ram bow and a partial double bottom. She displaced 2,047 metric tons (2,015 long tons; 2,256 short tons) normally. She had a crew of 170 officers and enlisted men.

The ship was powered by a single horizontal compound steam engine which drove a single screw propeller. Steam was provided by four coal-fired box boilers that were trunked into a single funnel amidships. The engine was rated at 1,750 indicated horsepower (1,300 kW) and produced a top speed of 12 knots (22 km/h; 14 mph), though by 1877 she was only capable of 8 kn (15 km/h; 9.2 mph). Asar-i Şevket carried 300 t (300 long tons; 330 short tons) of coal. A supplementary brig rig was also fitted.

Asar-i Şevket was armed with a battery of one 229 mm (9 in) muzzle loading Armstrong gun and four 178 mm (7 in) Armstrong guns. The 178 mm guns were mounted in a central, armored battery, with the 229 mm gun on top in an open barbette mount. The ship's armored belt consisted of wrought iron that was 152 mm (6 in) thick and was reduced to 114 mm (4.5 in) toward the bow and stern. Above the main belt, a strake of armor 114 mm thick protected the central battery, and the same thickness was used for the barbette.

== Service history ==
Asar-i Şevket, meaning "Work of God", was originally ordered by the Eyalet of Egypt, a province of the Ottoman Empire, in 1866 from the French Forges et Chantiers de la Gironde shipyard in Bordeaux under the name Kahira. Her keel was laid down in 1867, and she was launched the following year. Egyptian efforts to assert their independence angered Sultan Abdülaziz, who, on 5 June 1867, demanded Egypt surrender all of the ironclads ordered from foreign shipyards. After lengthy negotiations the vessel was formally transferred to the Ottoman Empire on 29 August 1868. The ship was then renamed Asar-i Şevket and commissioned into the Ottoman Navy on 3 March 1870.

Upon completion, Asar-i Şevket and the other ironclads then being built in Britain and France were sent to Crete to assist in the aftermath of the Cretan Revolt of 1866–1869. During this period, the Ottoman fleet, under Hobart Pasha, remained largely inactive, with training confined to reading translated British instruction manuals. Asar-i Şevket was assigned to the I Squadron of the Asiatic Fleet, along with her sister ship Necm-i Şevket and the ironclads Hifz-ur Rahman and Lütf-ü Celil. Early in the ship's career, the Ottoman ironclad fleet was activated every summer for short cruises from the Golden Horn to the Bosporus to ensure their propulsion systems were in operable condition.

=== Russo-Turkish War ===
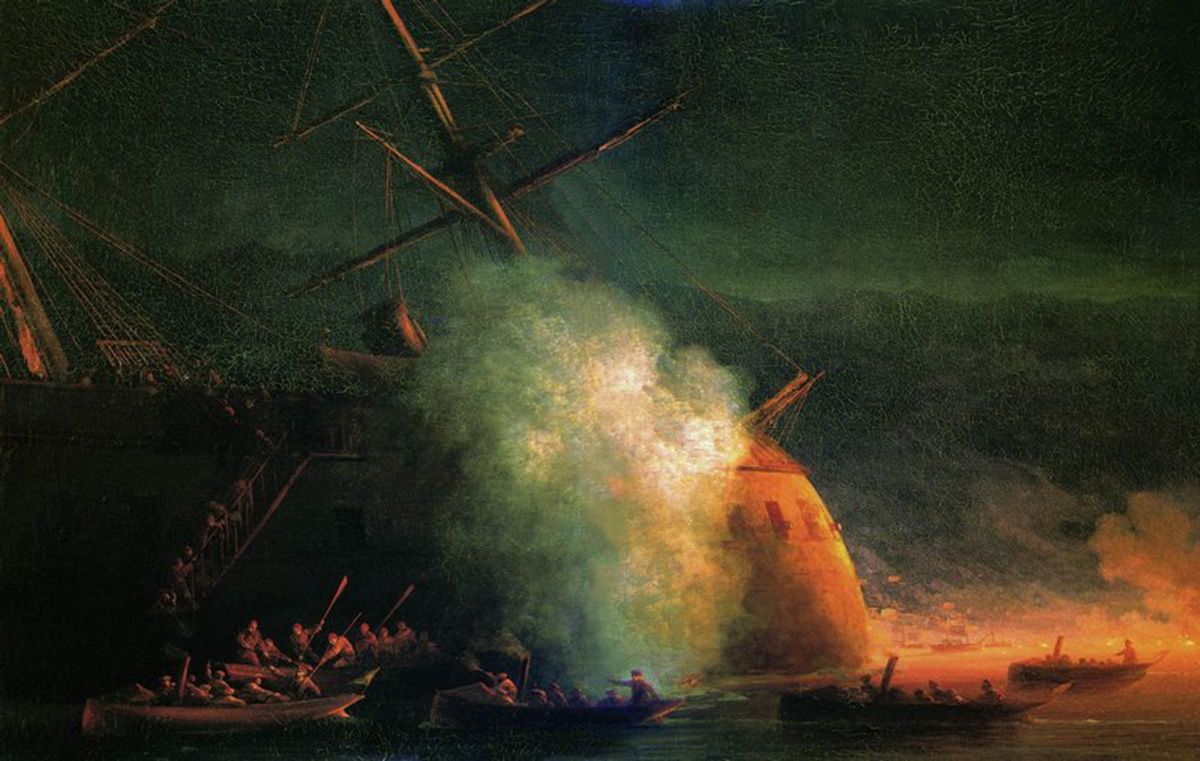
Russian painting of the attack on Asar-i Şevket, depicting her supposed sinking

The Ottoman fleet began mobilizing in September 1876 to prepare for a conflict with Russia, as tensions with the country had been growing for several years, an insurrection had begun in Ottoman Bosnia in mid-1875, and Serbia had declared war on the Ottoman Empire in July 1876. The Russo-Turkish War began on 24 April 1877 with a Russian declaration of war. By this time, Asar-i Şevket had been transferred to the I Division in the Mediterranean Fleet, but she was quickly transferred to the Black Sea squadron, with the bulk of the Ottoman ironclad fleet. The Ottoman fleet, commanded by Hobart Pasha, was vastly superior to the Russian Black Sea Fleet; the only ironclads the Russians possessed there were Vitse-admiral Popov and Novgorod, circular vessels that had proved to be useless in service. The presence of the fleet did force the Russians to keep two corps in reserve for coastal defense, but the Ottoman high command failed to make use of its naval superiority in a more meaningful way, particularly to hinder the Russian advance into the Balkans. Hobart Pasha took the fleet to the eastern Black Sea, where he was able to make a more aggressive use of it to support the Ottoman forces battling the Russians in the Caucasus. The fleet bombarded Poti and assisted in the defense of Batumi.

In May, Asar-i Şevket, the steam frigate Mubir-i Sürur, and several transport ships steamed to Batumi. Over the course of the war, Russian torpedo boats made several attacks on the vessels stationed in Batumi, but Asar-i Şevket was not damaged in any of them. By the end of June, Asar-i Şevket was transferred to the port of Sulina at the mouth of the Danube, along with the ironclads Muin-i Zafer and Hifz-ur Rahman. The ships were tasked with defending the seaward approach to the port, supporting three coastal fortifications. By August, the ship had been transferred to Sukhumi. There, on the night of 24 August, four Russian torpedo boats launched an attack on the ships in the harbor. One of the boats succeeded in detonating its spar torpedo under Asar-i Şevket's hull and claimed to sink her, but the ironclad was undamaged in the attack.

=== Later career ===
After the end of the war in 1878, Asar-i Şevket was laid up in Constantinople. This was in part due to chronically low budgets, and in part due to the fact that the Sultan, Abdul Hamid II, who had come to power after a coup deposed Murad V that involved senior members of the Navy, distrusted the Navy. The annual summer cruises to the Bosporus ended. By the mid-1880s, the Ottoman ironclad fleet was in poor condition, and Asar-i Şevket was unable to go to sea. Many of the ships' engines were unusable, having seized up from rust, and their hulls were badly fouled. The British naval attache to the Ottoman Empire at the time estimated that the Imperial Arsenal would take six months to get just five of the ironclads ready to go to sea. Throughout this period, the ship's crew was limited to about one-third the normal figure. During a period of tension with Greece in 1886, the fleet was brought to full crews and the ships were prepared to go to sea, but none actually left the Golden Horn, and they were quickly laid up again. By that time, most of the ships were capable of little more than 4 to 6 knots (7.4 to 11.1 km/h; 4.6 to 6.9 mph). In 1890, the ship was taken to the Imperial Arsenal for refitting, and new boilers were installed. The ship also received a battery of light guns, including two 87 mm (3.4 in) Krupp guns, two 63.5 mm (2.50 in) Krupp guns, two 37 mm (1.5 in) Hotchkiss revolver cannon, and one 25.4 mm (1 in) Nordenfelt gun. The ship returned to service on 12 February 1892.

At the start of the Greco-Turkish War in February 1897, the Ottomans inspected the fleet and found that almost all of the vessels, including Asar-i Şevket, to be completely unfit for combat against the Greek Navy. Many of the ships had rotted hulls and their crews are poorly trained. Through April and May, elements the Ottoman fleet made several sorties into the Aegean Sea in an attempt to raise morale among the ships' crews, though the Ottomans had no intention of attacking Greek forces. During these operations, Asar-i Şevket and the rest of the ironclad fleet ventured no further than Naga, the narrowest point of the Dardanelles. The condition of the Ottoman fleet could not be concealed from foreign observers, which proved to be an embarrassment for the government and finally forced Abdul Hamid II to authorize a modernization program, which recommended that the ironclads be modernized in foreign shipyards. German firms, including Krupp, Schichau-Werke, and AG Vulcan, were to rebuild the ships, but after having surveyed the ships, withdrew from the project in December 1897 owing to the impracticality of modernizing the ships and the inability of the Ottoman government to pay for the work. By 1900, the contracts were finally awarded, and Asar-i Şevket was not included in the program. Instead, the ship was decommissioned in 1903 and was ultimately sold to ship breakers on 31 July 1909.
