= Shaukat =

Shaukat (Urdu: شوکت) is a Muslim male and female given name whose meaning is "Power" and "Dignity". It is a variation of the Arabic name Shawkat (Arabic: شَوْكَت).

== Disambiguation ==
People named Shaukat include:

- Aasma Shaukat, Pakistani-American gastroenterologist and physician-scientist
- Shaukat Ali (singer) (1944–2021), a Pakistani folk singer
- Shaukat Aziz (born 1949), the Prime Minister of Pakistan from 2004 to 2007
- Shaukat Siddiqui (1923–2006), a Pakistani writer of fiction
- Shaukat Kaifi (1926–2019), a small-time Indian actress; wife of poet Kaifi Azmi
- Shaukat (wrestler) (born 1987), the first Malaysian professional wrestler
