= Asar-i Şevket-class ironclad =

Ironclad warship class of the Ottoman Navy

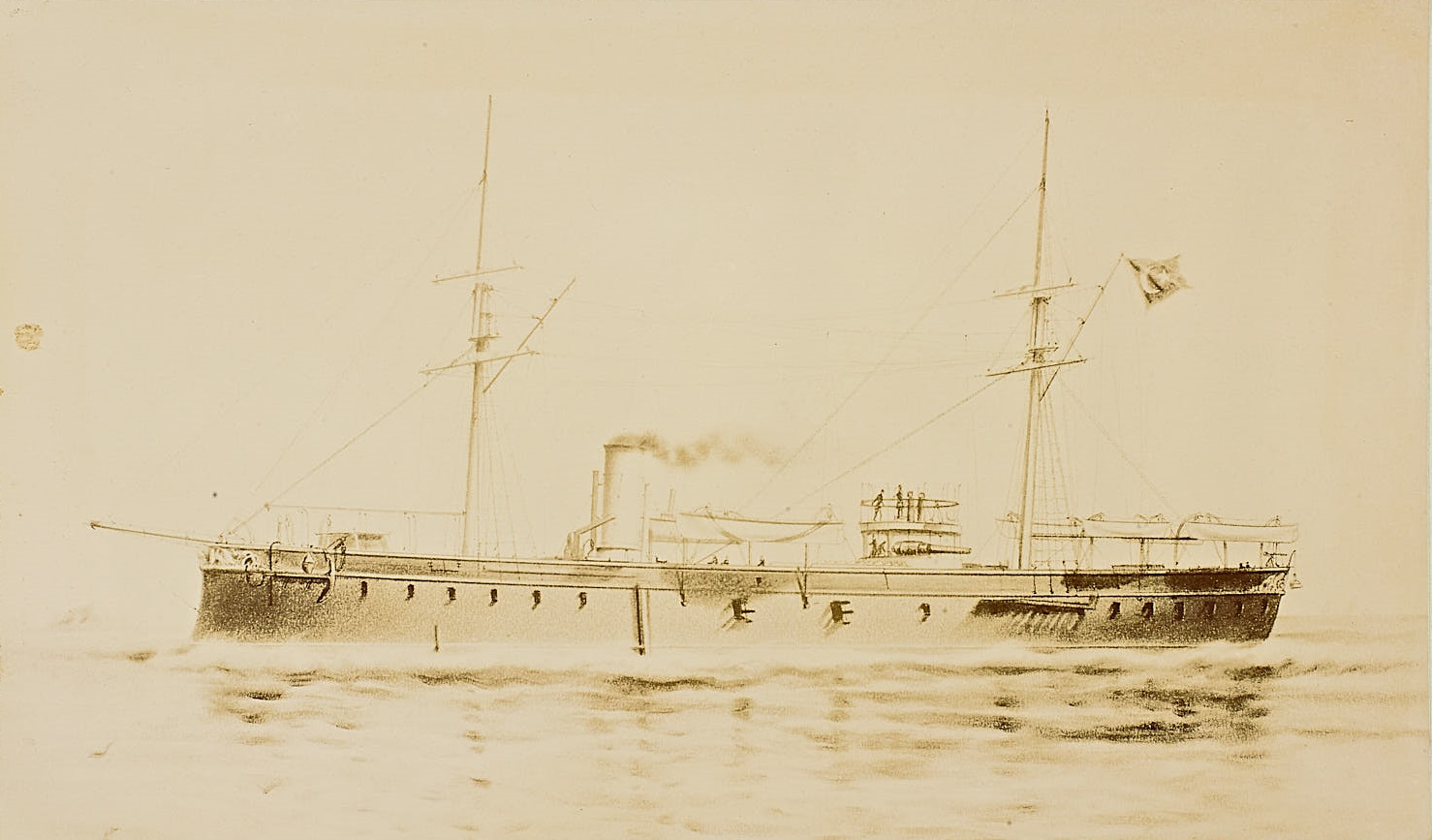
- Necm-i Şevket underway

Class overview
- Builders: Forges et Chantiers de la Gironde
- Operators: Ottoman Empire
- Preceded by: Asar-i Tevfik
- Succeeded by: Lütf-ü Celil-class ironclad
- Built: 1867–1870
- In commission: 1870–1929
- Completed: 2
- Scrapped: 2

General characteristics
- Type: Ironclad warship
- Displacement: 2,047 metric tons (2,015 long tons; 2,256 short tons)
- Length: 66.4 m (217 ft 10 in) (loa)
- Beam: 12.9 m (42 ft 4 in)
- Draft: 5 m (16 ft 5 in)
- Installed power: 4 × box boilers; 1,750 ihp (1,300 kW)
- Propulsion: 1 × compound steam engine; 1 × screw propeller
- Speed: 12 knots (22 km/h; 14 mph)
- Complement: 170
- Armament: 1 × 229 mm (9 in) Armstrong gun; 4 × 178 mm (7 in) Armstrong guns
- Armor: Belt: 152 mm (6 in); Battery: 114 mm (4.5 in); Barbette: 114 mm

The Asar-i Şevket class of ironclad warships consisted of two vessels, Asar-i Şevket and Necm-i Şevket, built for the Ottoman Navy in the 1860s. The ships were constructed in France and were based on the design of the earlier ironclad Asar-i Tevfik. The two vessels, built as central battery ships, carried an armament of four 178 mm (7 in) Armstrong guns in a central casemate and one 229 mm (9 in) Armstrong gun in a revolving barbette atop the casemate.

Both ships served during the Russo-Turkish War of 1877–1878, where they operated against Russian forces in the Black Sea. They were primarily tasked with supporting Ottoman forces ashore in the Caucasus. After the war, both vessels were placed in reserve, and saw no further activity until 1897, when they were mobilized at the start of the Greco-Turkish War. Like the rest of the Ottoman fleet, both ships were in poor condition and were unable to be used offensively. Asar-i Şevket was decommissioned and sold for scrap in the 1900s but Necm-i Şevket lingered on in service, primarily as a barracks ship until 1929. During this period, she briefly saw action again during the First Balkan War, when she provided fire support to beleaguered Ottoman defenders protecting Constantinople from the Bulgarian Army. She was finally decommissioned in 1929 and sold to ship breakers.

== Design ==
In the early 1860s, the Eyalet of Egypt, a province of the Ottoman Empire, ordered several ironclad warships for its fleet as part of a rearmament program to again challenge the power of the central government—the last having been the Second Egyptian–Ottoman War twenty years earlier. These included the two Asar-i Şevket-class vessels, ordered in 1866. After lengthy negotiations, the crisis was resolved when the Egyptian ironclads, including Asar-i Şevket and Necm-i Şevket, were transferred to the central government on 29 August 1868, among other concessions made by Egypt.

The design for the Asar-i Şevket was based on the preceding ironclad Asar-i Tevfik, albeit a much smaller version, though both designs shared the central battery arrangement coupled with a superimposed barbette mounting for additional heavy guns. Asar-i Tevfik was built at the same French shipyard, and was in turn based on contemporary French ironclad designs like the Colbert class.

=== Characteristics ===
Plan and profile drawing of the Asar-i Şevket class

The ships of the Asar-i Şevket class were 66.4 m (217 ft 10 in) long overall and 62 m (203 ft) long between perpendiculars. They had a beam of 12.9 m (42 ft 4 in) and a draft of 5 m (16 ft 5 in). The hull was constructed with iron, incorporated ram bow and a double bottom. They displaced 2,047 metric tons (2,015 long tons; 2,256 short tons) normally. They had a crew of 170 officers and enlisted men.

The ships were powered by a single horizontal compound steam engine which drove a single screw propeller. Steam was provided by four coal-fired box boilers that were trunked into a single funnel amidships. The engine was rated at 1,750 indicated horsepower (1,300 kW) and produced a top speed of 12 knots (22 km/h; 14 mph), though by 1877 both vessels was only capable of 8 kn (15 km/h; 9.2 mph) as a result of poor maintenance. Asar-i Şevket carried 300 t (300 long tons; 330 short tons) of coal. In 1890, both ships were taken to the Imperial Arsenal for refitting, where new boilers were installed. A supplementary brig rig was also fitted.

The Asar-i Şevket class was armed with a battery of one 229 mm (9 in) muzzle loading Armstrong gun and four 178 mm (7 in) Armstrong guns. The 178 mm guns were mounted in a central, armored battery, with the 229 mm gun on top in an open barbette mount. During the 1890 refit, both ships received a battery of light guns, including two 87 mm (3.4 in) Krupp guns, two 63.5 mm (2.50 in) Krupp guns, two 37 mm (1.5 in) Hotchkiss revolver cannon, and one 25.4 mm (1 in) Nordenfelt gun.

Armor protection for the class consisted of wrought iron plate. The ships' armored belt was 152 mm (6 in) thick and was reduced to 114 mm (4.5 in) below the waterline. The portion above the waterline was 1 m (4 ft 3 in) wide, and the portion below was 2 m (6 ft) wide. Above the main belt, a strake of armor 114 mm thick protected the central battery, and the same thickness was used for the barbette.

== Ships ==
Ship	Builder	Laid down	Launched	Completed
Asar-i Şevket	Forges et Chantiers de la Gironde	1867	1868	3 March 1870
Necm-i Şevket	Forges et Chantiers de la Gironde	1867	1868	3 March 1870

== Service history ==
Both ships of the class were stationed in Crete after they entered service, to assist in stabilizing the island in the aftermath of the Cretan Revolt of 1866–1869. Nevertheless, the Ottoman fleet remained largely inactive during this period. The two ships saw action during the Russo-Turkish War of 1877–1878, where they operated against Russian forces in the Black Sea. They were primarily occupied with bombarding Russian coastal positions in support of the Ottoman army in the Caucasus. In May 1877, Necm-i Şevket supported an amphibious assault on the port of Sokhumi. On 24 August, while anchored in Sokhumi, Asar-i Şevket was attacked by a Russian torpedo boat, but the spar torpedo did no damage to her hull. After the war, both vessels were laid up in Constantinople, and they received a minor refit in 1882.

At the start of the Greco-Turkish War in February 1897, the Ottomans inspected the fleet and found that almost all of the vessels, including both Asar-i Şevket-class ships, to be completely unfit for combat against the Greek Navy. Following the end of the war with Greece, the government decided to begin a naval reconstruction program. Asar-i Şevket and Necm-i Şevket proved to be in too poor a condition to merit rebuilding, and they were not included in the program. The former was decommissioned in 1903 and sold for scrap in 1909. Necm-i Şevket lingered on in service as a barracks ship until the outbreak of the First Balkan War in 1912. Bulgarian forces threatened to capture Constantinople, and so the Navy pressed the ship back into service to provide gunfire support to the Ottoman defenders. After the threat passed, she returned to barracks ship duties, a role she filled until 1929, when she was decommissioned after nearly sixty years in service.
