= Ottoman ironclad Hifz-ur Rahman =

Ironclad warship of the Ottoman Navy

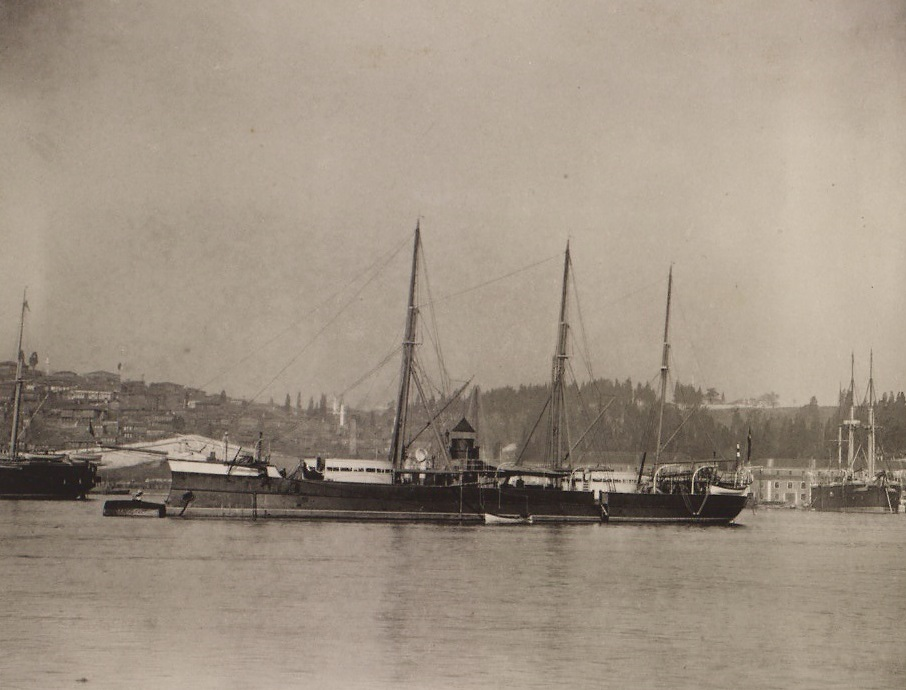
- Hifz-ur Rahman in the Golden Horn in the 1890s

History

Ottoman Empire
- Name: Hifz-ur Rahman
- Namesake: "Merciful Protector"
- Ordered: 1867
- Builder: Forges et Chantiers de la Gironde
- Laid down: 1868
- Launched: 1869
- Commissioned: March 1870
- Decommissioned: 1909
- Fate: Sold for scrap, 11 November 1909

General characteristics
- Class & type: Lütf-ü Celil class
- Displacement: 2,540 t (2,500 long tons)
- Length: 64.4 m (211 ft 3 in) (loa)
- Beam: 13.6 m (44 ft 7 in)
- Draft: 4.4 m (14 ft 5 in)
- Installed power: 2 × locomotive boilers; 2,000 ihp (1,500 kW)
- Propulsion: 1 × compound steam engine; 2 × screw propellers
- Speed: 12 knots (22 km/h; 14 mph)
- Complement: 12 officers; 110 enlisted men
- Armament: 2 × 229 mm (9 in) Armstrong guns; 2 × 178 mm (7 in) Armstrong guns
- Armor: Belt: 140 mm (5.5 in); Turrets: 140 mm

Hifz-ur Rahman (Ottoman Turkish: Merciful Protector) was the second of two Lütf-ü Celil-class ironclads built for the Ottoman Navy in the late 1860s. Originally ordered by the Khedivate of Egypt, an autonomous vassal state of the Ottoman Empire, the central Ottoman government forced Egypt to surrender Hifz-ur Rahman while she was still under construction at the French Forges et Chantiers de la Gironde shipyard. The vessel was a turret ship, armed with two 229 mm (9 in) Armstrong guns and two 178 mm (7 in) Armstrong guns, both pairs in revolving gun turrets.

Hifz-ur Rahman saw action during the Russo-Turkish War in 1877–1878, where she operated on the Danube to try to prevent Russian forces from crossing the river. While defending the port of Sulina, she engaged Russian gunboats in an inconclusive action. She was laid up for twenty years, until the outbreak of the Greco-Turkish War in 1897, which highlighted the badly deteriorated state of the Ottoman fleet. A large-scale reconstruction program was put in place, and Hifz-ur Rahman was rebuilt in the Imperial Arsenal in the early 1890s. Nevertheless, she saw no further service of any significance, and she was sold for scrap in 1909.

== Design ==
Hifz-ur Rahman was 64.4 m (211 ft 3 in) long overall, with a beam of 13.6 m (44 ft 7 in) and a draft of 4.4 m (14 ft 5 in). The hull was constructed with iron, incorporated ram bow, and displaced 2,540 metric tons (2,500 long tons) normally and 1,741 t (1,714 long tons) BOM. She had a crew of 12 officers and 110 enlisted men.

The ship was powered by a single horizontal compound steam engine which drove two screw propellers. Steam was provided by two coal-fired locomotive boilers that were trunked into a single funnel amidships. The engine was rated at 2,000 indicated horsepower (1,500 kW) and produced a top speed of 12 knots (22 km/h; 14 mph), though by 1877 she was only capable of 10 kn (19 km/h; 12 mph). Hifz-ur Rahman carried 300 t (300 long tons; 330 short tons) of coal. A supplementary barque rig was also fitted.

Hifz-ur Rahman was armed with a battery of two 229 mm (9 in) muzzle loading Armstrong guns and two 178 mm (7 in) Armstrong guns, each pair mounted in a revolving gun turret, both of which were on the centerline. The 229 mm guns were placed in the forward turret and the turret for the 178 mm guns was located aft of the main mast. The ship's armored belt consisted of wrought iron that was 140 mm (5.5 in) thick and was reduced to 120 mm (4.6 in) toward the bow and stern. Above the main belt, a strake of armor 76 mm (3 in) thick protected the turret bases, magazines, and machinery spaces. The turrets were protected by 140 mm of iron plating.

== Service history ==
The Khedivate of Egypt, an autonomous tributary state of the Ottoman Empire, awarded the contract for Hifz-ur Rahman to the Forges et Chantiers de la Gironde shipyard in Lormont in 1867, where her keel was laid down the following year. Egyptian efforts to assert their independence angered Sultan Abdülaziz, who, on 5 June 1867, demanded Egypt surrender all of the ironclads ordered from foreign shipyards. After lengthy negotiations, the vessel was formally transferred to the Ottoman Empire on 29 August 1868. Her completed hull was launched in 1869 and fitting-out work was completed by 1870, when sea trials began. Later that year, Hifz-ur Rahman, meaning "Merciful Protector", was commissioned into the Ottoman fleet in March.

Upon completion, Hifz-ur Rahman and the other ironclads then being built in Britain and France were sent to Crete to assist in the aftermath of the Cretan Revolt of 1866–1869. During this period, the Ottoman fleet, under Hobart Pasha, remained largely inactive, with training confined to reading translated British instruction manuals. Hifz-ur Rahman was assigned to the II Squadron of the Asiatic Fleet, along with her sister ship Lütf-ü Celil and the ironclads Avnillah and Muin-i Zafer. Early in the ship's career, the Ottoman ironclad fleet was activated every summer for short cruises from the Golden Horn to the Bosporus to ensure their propulsion systems were in operable condition. In 1875, the ship received a single 120 mm (4.7 in) gun manufactured by Krupp.

The Ottoman fleet began mobilizing in September 1876 to prepare for a conflict with Russia, as tensions with the country had been growing for several years, an insurrection had begun in Ottoman Bosnia in mid-1875, and Serbia had declared war on the Ottoman Empire in July 1876. The Russo-Turkish War began on 24 April 1877 with a Russian declaration of war. At the start of the war, Hifz-ur Rahman and Lütf-ü Celil were assigned to the Danube Squadron, where they were tasked with preventing Russian forces from crossing the river. Hifz-ur Rahman was stationed at the port of Sulina at the mouth of the Danube, along with the ironclads Muin-i Zafer and Asar-i Şevket. The ships were tasked with defending the seaward approach to the port, supporting three coastal fortifications. Starting in November, a Russian flotilla of small vessels attempted to lay a minefield off Sulina to block the Ottoman vessels. After the ironclad Mukaddeme-i Hayir drove off the minelayers on 8 November, the Russians returned with mortar-equipped gunboats the next day. In the ensuing engagement, Hifz-ur Rahman was hit once by a shell that struck one of her boilers, forcing her to withdraw.

The ship was laid up in Constantinople in 1878; she did not see further activity for the next twenty years. The annual summer cruises to the Bosporus ended. By the mid-1880s, the Ottoman ironclad fleet was in poor condition, and Hifz-ur Rahman was unable to go to sea. Many of the ships' engines were unusable, having seized up from rust, and their hulls were badly fouled. The British naval attache to the Ottoman Empire at the time estimated that the Imperial Arsenal would take six months to get just five of the ironclads ready to go to sea. Throughout this period, the ship's crew was limited to about one-third the normal figure. During a period of tension with Greece in 1886, the fleet was brought to full crews and the ships were prepared to go to sea, but none actually left the Golden Horn, and they were quickly laid up again. By that time, most of the ships were capable of little more than 4 to 6 knots (7.4 to 11.1 km/h; 4.6 to 6.9 mph). Hifz-ur Rahman was modernized at the Imperial Arsenal between 1891 and 1894. Her armament was significantly revised; her two original 229 mm guns were removed. In their place, she received 150 mm (5.9 in) Krupp guns, and four 37 mm (1.5 in) Hotchkiss guns and two 25.4 mm (1 in) Nordenfelt guns were also added.

At the start of the Greco-Turkish War in February 1897, Hifz-ur Rahman was assigned to the II Squadron. The Ottomans inspected the fleet and found that almost all of the vessels, including Hifz-ur Rahman, to be completely unfit for combat against the Greek Navy. Many of the ships had rotted hulls and their crews are poorly trained. Through April and May, the Ottoman fleet made several sorties into the Aegean Sea in an attempt to raise morale among the ships' crews, though the Ottomans had no intention of attacking Greek forces. During these operations, Hifz-ur Rahman were stationed at Morto Bay at the mouth of the Dardanelles, while the rest of the ironclads remained safely inside the straits. The condition of the Ottoman fleet could not be concealed from foreign observers, which proved to be an embarrassment for the government and finally forced Sultan Abdul Hamid II to authorize a modernization program, which recommended that the ironclads be modernized in foreign shipyards. Hifz-ur Rahman was not included in the program, and instead she was decommissioned in 1909 and placed on the disposal list on 31 July. She was sold for scrap on 11 November that year and subsequently broken up.
