= Lütf-ü Celil-class ironclad =

Ironclad warship class of the Ottoman Navy

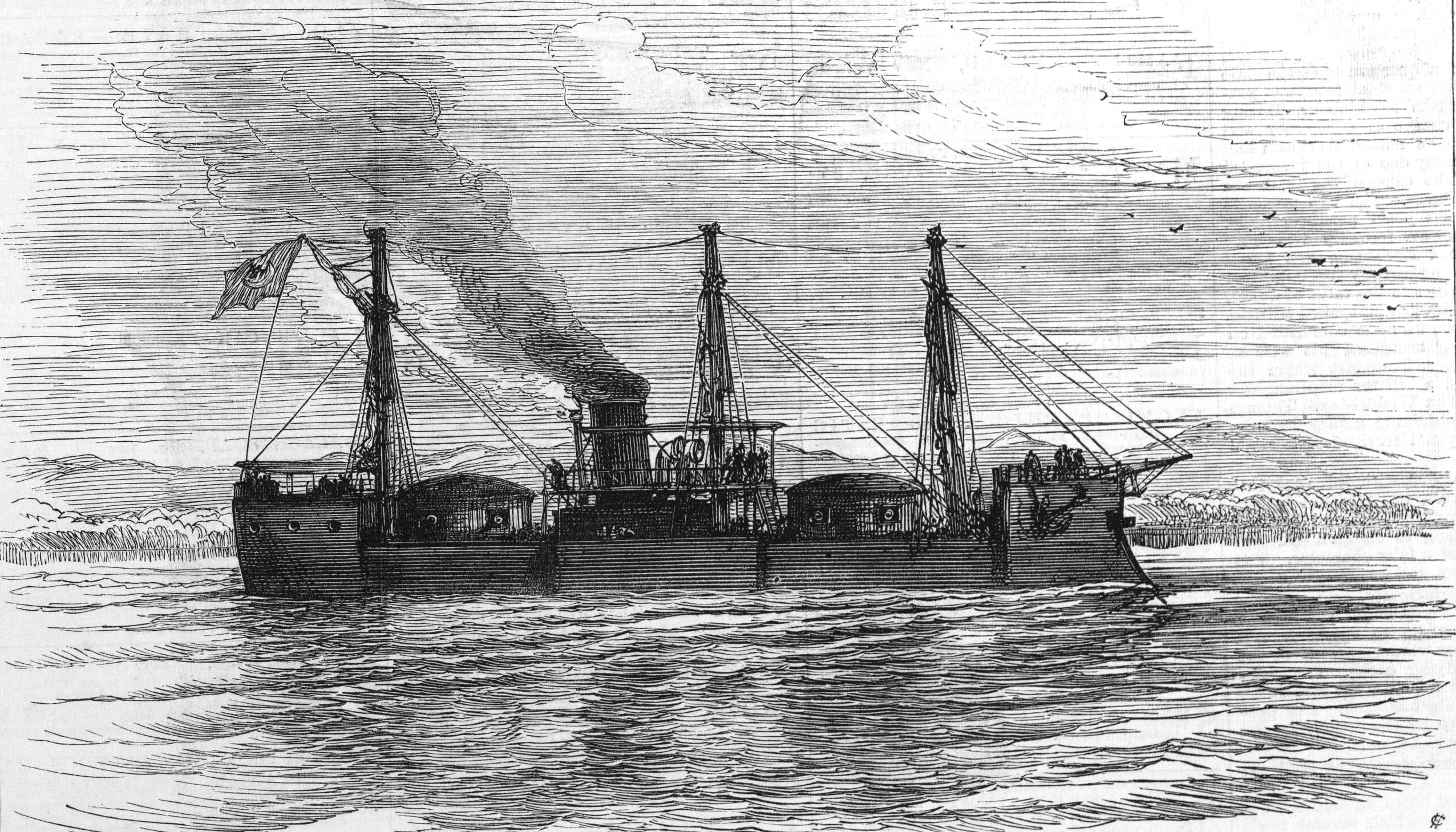
- Illustration of Lütf-ü Celil

Class overview
- Operators: Ottoman Empire
- Preceded by: Asar-i Şevket-class ironclad
- Succeeded by: Avnillah-class ironclad
- Built: 1868–;1870
- In commission: 1870–1909
- Completed: 2
- Lost: 1
- Scrapped: 1

General characteristics
- Type: Monitor
- Displacement: 2,540 t (2,500 long tons)
- Length: 64.4 m (211 ft 3 in) (loa)
- Beam: 13.6 m (44 ft 7 in)
- Draft: 4.4 m (14 ft 5 in)
- Installed power: 2 × locomotive boilers; 2,000 ihp (1,500 kW)
- Propulsion: 1 × compound steam engine; 2 × screw propellers
- Speed: 12 knots (22 km/h; 14 mph)
- Complement: 12 officers; 110 enlisted men
- Armament: 2 × 229 mm (9 in) Armstrong guns; 2 × 178 mm (7 in) Armstrong guns
- Armor: Belt: 140 mm (5.5 in); Turrets: 140 mm

The Lütf-ü Celil class was a pair of ironclad warships built for the Ottoman Navy by a French shipyard in the late 1860s. Originally ordered by the Eyalet of Egypt but confiscated by the Ottoman Empire while under construction, the class comprised the vessels Lütf-ü Celil and Hifz-ur Rahman. The ships were sea-going monitors that mounted their main battery of two 225 mm (8.9 in) Armstrong guns and two 178 mm (7 in) Armstrong guns in two revolving gun turrets.

Both vessels saw action during the Russo-Turkish War of 1877–1878, where Lütf-ü Celil was sunk by a Russian artillery battery on the Danube. Hifz-ur Rahman engaged Russian minelayers at the mouth of the Danube but otherwise saw little action. She survived the war and was laid up for the following twenty years. She was mobilized at the outbreak of the Greco-Turkish War in 1897, but like the rest of the Ottoman fleet, was in poor condition. The ship was eventually sold in 1909 and broken up.

== Design ==
In the early 1860s, the Eyalet of Egypt, a province of the Ottoman Empire, ordered several ironclad warships for its fleet as part of a rearmament program to again challenge the power of the central government—the last having been the Second Egyptian–Ottoman War twenty years earlier. These included the two Lütf-ü Celil-class vessels, ordered in 1866. After lengthy negotiations, the crisis was resolved when the Egyptian ironclads, including Lütf-ü Celil and Hifz-ur Rahman, were transferred to the central government on 29 August 1868, among other concessions made by Egypt.

=== Characteristics ===
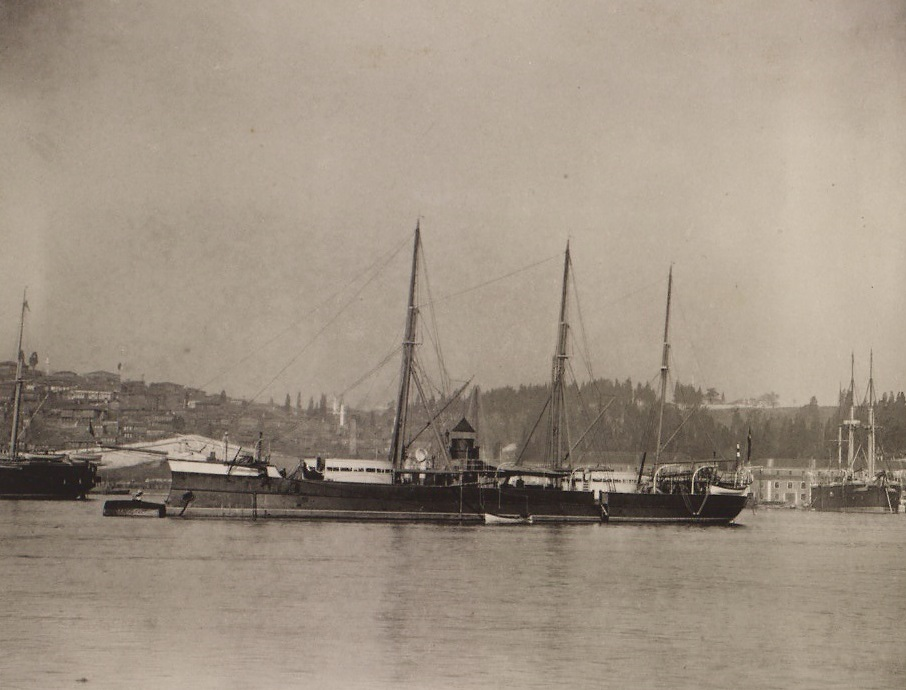
Hifz-ur Rahman in the 1890s

The ships of the Lütf-ü Celil class were 64.4 m (211 ft 3 in) long overall and 62.18 m (204 ft) long between perpendiculars. They had a beam of 13.6 m (44 ft 7 in) and a draft of 4.4 m (14 ft 5 in). The hull was constructed with iron, incorporated a ram bow, and a raised forecastle and sterncastle. They displaced 2,540 metric tons (2,500 long tons) normally and 1,741 t (1,714 long tons) BOM. They had a crew of 12 officers and 110 enlisted men.

The ships were powered by a single horizontal compound engine which drove two screw propellers. Steam was provided by two coal-fired locomotive boilers that were trunked into a single funnel amidships. The engine was rated at 2,000 indicated horsepower (1,500 kW) and produced a top speed of 12 knots (22 km/h; 14 mph), though by 1877 the ships were only capable of 10 kn (19 km/h; 12 mph). Lütf-ü Celil carried 300 t (300 long tons; 330 short tons) of coal. A supplementary barque rig with three masts was also fitted.

Lütf-ü Celil and Hifz-ur Rahman were seagoing monitors armed with a battery of two 225 mm (8.9 in) muzzle loading Armstrong guns and two 178 mm (7 in) Armstrong guns, each pair mounted in a revolving gun turret, both of which were on the centerline. The 225 mm guns were placed in the forward turret and the turret for the 178 mm guns was located aft of the main mast. The turrets were hand-operated. In 1875, both ships received a single 120 mm (4.7 in) gun manufactured by Krupp. In 1891—1894, Hifz-ur Rahman was partially rearmed. The two 225 mm guns were replaced with a pair 150 mm (5.9 in) Krupp guns, and four 37 mm (1.5 in) Hotchkiss guns and two 25.4 mm (1 in) Nordenfelt guns were added.

The two ships were armored with wrought iron plates. The ships' armored belt was 140 mm (5.5 in) thick and was reduced to 117 mm (4.6 in) toward the bow and stern. It extended 0.76 m (2 ft 6 in) above and below the waterline. Above the main belt, a strake of armor 76 mm (3 in) thick protected the turret bases, magazines, and machinery spaces. The upper portion of the side armor was connected to an armored deck that was 38 mm (1.5 in) thick. The turrets were protected by 140 mm of iron plating.

== Ships ==
Ship	Builder	Laid down	Launched	Completed
Lütf-ü Celil	Forges et Chantiers de la Gironde	1868	1869	March 1870
Hifz-ur Rahman	Forges et Chantiers de la Gironde	1868	1869	March 1870

== Service history ==
Illustration of Lütf-ü Celil exploding, after having been hit by Russian artillery fire

Both ships of the class were stationed in Crete after they entered service, to assist in stabilizing the island in the aftermath of the Cretan Revolt of 1866–1869. Nevertheless, the Ottoman fleet remained largely inactive during this period. Both ships saw action during the Russo-Turkish War of 1877–1878, where they operated against Russian forces in the Black Sea. At the start of the war, Lütf-ü Celil and Hifz-ur Rahman were assigned to the Danube Squadron, where they were tasked with preventing Russian forces from crossing the river. While on patrol on 11 May 1877, Lütf-ü Celil engaged a Russian artillery battery, and one of the Russian shells struck the vessel, probably in the boiler room, where it caused a large explosion that destroyed the ship, killing most of her crew. Hifz-ur Rahman later assisted in the defense of Sulina at the mouth of the Danube, and engaged Russian minelayers in an action on 9 November 1877 where she was lightly damaged.

Hifz-ur Rahman was laid up in Constantinople. She was refitted at the Imperial Arsenal in 1891–1894, but was nevertheless in poor condition by the outbreak of the Greco-Turkish War in February 1897, like the rest of the ancient Ottoman ironclad fleet. As a result, the fleet was kept safely behind the Dardanelles forts and it saw no action. The ship remained in service for another decade until she was decommissioned in 1909; she was sold in November that year to ship breakers and thereafter dismantled.
