= Shavkat =

Shavkat is a Persian masculine given name, often extended to Turkic, it is a variation of the Arabic name Shawkat (Arabic: شَوْكَت). It may refer to

- Shavkat Mirziyoyev (born 1957), President of Uzbekistan
- Shavkat Mullajanov (born 1986), Uzbekistani football player
- Shavkat Raimqulov (born 1984), Uzbekistani football player
- Shavkat Salomov (born 1985), Uzbekistani football striker
- Shavkat Rakhmonov (born 1994), Kazakhstani mixed martial artist

== See also ==
- Shawkat
