= Shawkat =

Shawkat (variations include Shaukat, Shavkat, or Şevket; Arabic: شَوْكَت) is a masculine Arabic given name and surname. It derives from the word ("شَوْكة" which means "Might" or "Strength") and itself is derived from the word ("شَوْك" which means "Thorns"). Notable people with the name include:

- Alia Shawkat, American actress best known from her role in the television series Arrested Development
- Assef Shawkat, head of Syria's military intelligence
- Naji Shawkat, Iraqi politician and cabinet member who served as prime minister from November 3, 1932, to March 18, 1933
- Shawkat Ali (1918–1975), Bengali politician, leader of Bengali Language Movement
- Shawkat Ali, politician and deputy speaker of Bangladesh
- Shawkat Ali, novelist from Bangladesh
- Shawkat Osman, Bangladeshi novelist and short story writer
- Awn Shawkat Al-Khasawneh, Jordanian politician and judge, Prime Minister of Jordan from October 2011 to April 2012, vice-president of the International Court of Justice
- Shaukat Dukanwala, UAE cricketer
- Shaukat Aziz (born 1949), Prime Minister of Pakistan 2004–2007
- Shaukat Hameed Khan, Pakistani nuclear physicist and former director of Pakistan Atomic Energy Commission (PAEC)
- Syed Shaukat Hussain Rizvi, Indian director and producer
- Maulana Shaukat Ali, Indian Muslim nationalist
- Major General Shaukat Sultan, Pakistani former director general of Inter Services Public Relations (ISPR)
- Shaukat Hayat Khan (1915–1998), Punjabi politician, military officer, and Pakistan Movement activist
- Sardar Shaukat Hussein Khan Mazari, Pakistani politician

== See also ==
- Shaukat Khanum Memorial Cancer Hospital and Research Centre, a cancer research hospital and cancer research institute in Pakistan
