= Aasma Shaukat =

Pakistani-American gastroenterologist

- Born: Pakistan
- Education: Aga Khan University; Johns Hopkins University
- Scientific career
- Fields: Gastroenterology
- Workplaces: Minneapolis Veterans Affairs Health Care System; New York University

Aasma Shaukat is a Pakistani-American gastroenterologist and physician-scientist. She is the Robert M. and Mary H. Glickman Professor of Medicine at the New York University Grossman School of Medicine. Shaukat serves as director of outcomes research for the Division of Gastroenterology and Hepatology at NYU Langone Health. Her research addresses colorectal cancer screening methods and quality indicators for colonoscopy.

== Early life and education ==
Shaukat was born in Pakistan. She earned an M.D. from Aga Khan University in 1998 and a Master of Public Health (MPH) from Johns Hopkins Bloomberg School of Public Health in 2000. She completed an internal medicine residency at the University at Buffalo School of Medicine in 2003 and a gastroenterology fellowship at Emory University School of Medicine in 2006. Shaukat holds board certification in gastroenterology from the American Board of Internal Medicine.

== Career ==
Shaukat was affiliated with the Minneapolis Veterans Affairs Health Care System. During her tenure, she hired and mentored research staff, including Alex Pretti.

At New York University Grossman School of Medicine, Shaukat holds the endowed position of Robert M. and Mary H. Glickman Professor of Medicine. She also serves as a professor in the Department of Population Health and co-director of Translational Research Education and Careers (TREC). She acts as the director of outcomes research for the Division of Gastroenterology and Hepatology at NYU Langone Health. She consults for medical technology and diagnostic companies, including Iterative Scopes, Medtronic, Freenome, Guardant Health, and Universal DX.

Shaukat specializes in the treatment of diverticular disease and colon polyps. She has published on the necessity of quality indicators for colonoscopy, arguing that the procedure is "highly operator-dependent" and requires benchmarks to effectively reduce colorectal cancer burden. Her work includes comparative analyses of screening modalities, such as Fecal Immunochemical Testing (FIT) versus colonoscopy, focusing on cost-effectiveness and long-term outcomes.

In 2022, she authored "Improving Quality and Outcomes in Colonoscopy" for Gastroenterology & Hepatology. In 2026, she co-authored a systematic scoping review in Endoscopy on polyp resection completeness and studies in the Journal of the National Cancer Institute regarding emerging blood-based screening tests and age-adjusted screening performance. Shaukat received the Healio Woman Disruptor of the Year Award from Healio Gastroenterology. The American College of Gastroenterology awarded her the MVP Scopy Award for her work in colorectal cancer awareness.
