= Şevket Seidametov =

- Шевкет Сейдаметов
- Born: April 19, 1954 (age 71)

Shevket Seydametov (born 19 April 1954 in Narpay village, Bukhara region, Uzbek SSR, USSR) is a Soviet and Ukrainian theater, film, and arts and crafts artist of Crimean Tatar origin.

== Biography ==
Born in the village of Narpay, Bukhara region of Uzbekistan, in a family of deported Crimean Tatars. In 1957, together with his family, he moved to the Leninabad region of the Tajik SSR.

In 1972 he entered and in 1976 graduated from the Republican Art College named after M. Olimov in Dushanbe (Tajikistan). He was sent to the Leninabad Art Fund, where he was engaged in design work, mastered the art of ceramics, carried out monumental painting. From the same 1976 he took part in regional and republican exhibitions.

After the collapse of the USSR in 1992, he returned to Crimea, settled in the village of Dubki, Simferopol region. Since 1993 he has been working at the Crimean Tatar Music and Drama Theatre, since 1994 he has been the chief artist of the theatre. Most of the performances staged by the theater during 1993-2004 were designed by Shevket Seydametov.

Since 2003 he began to work in cinema. In 2004 he moved to Kyiv.

== Selected works ==
- Relief in the interior of the Leninabad restaurant, 1983 (chamotte, terracotta, glaze).
- Mosaic panel in the interior of the chemical plant "Isfara", 1979 (smalt, rustic).
- Wall painting in the interior of school No. 29 in Khujand, 1989 (gesso, oil).
- Knitting "March", 1980.
- Tapestry "Time", 1990.

== Theatrical works ==
Scenography and costume designs for the performances of the Crimean Tatar Music and Drama Theatre:

- Shamately Neighbors (1993).
- Arshin Mal-Alan (1995).
- Let's play, let's listen, let's have fun here (1997).
- Kadynchiklar (1997).
- Wall Wedding (1998).
- Mamluk Baybars (1998).

== Cinema works ==
- 2009 - Territory of beauty.
- 2010 - Save and save.
- 2011-2013 - Taxi.
- 2013 - Female doctor-2.
- 2013 - Khaitarma.
- 2014 - Female robbery ("also played the role of Farhad, the janitor").
- 2016 - On the line of life.
- 2017 - Cyborgs.
- 2017 - Someone else's prayer.
