= Japanese cruiser Unebi =

Japanese protected cruiser

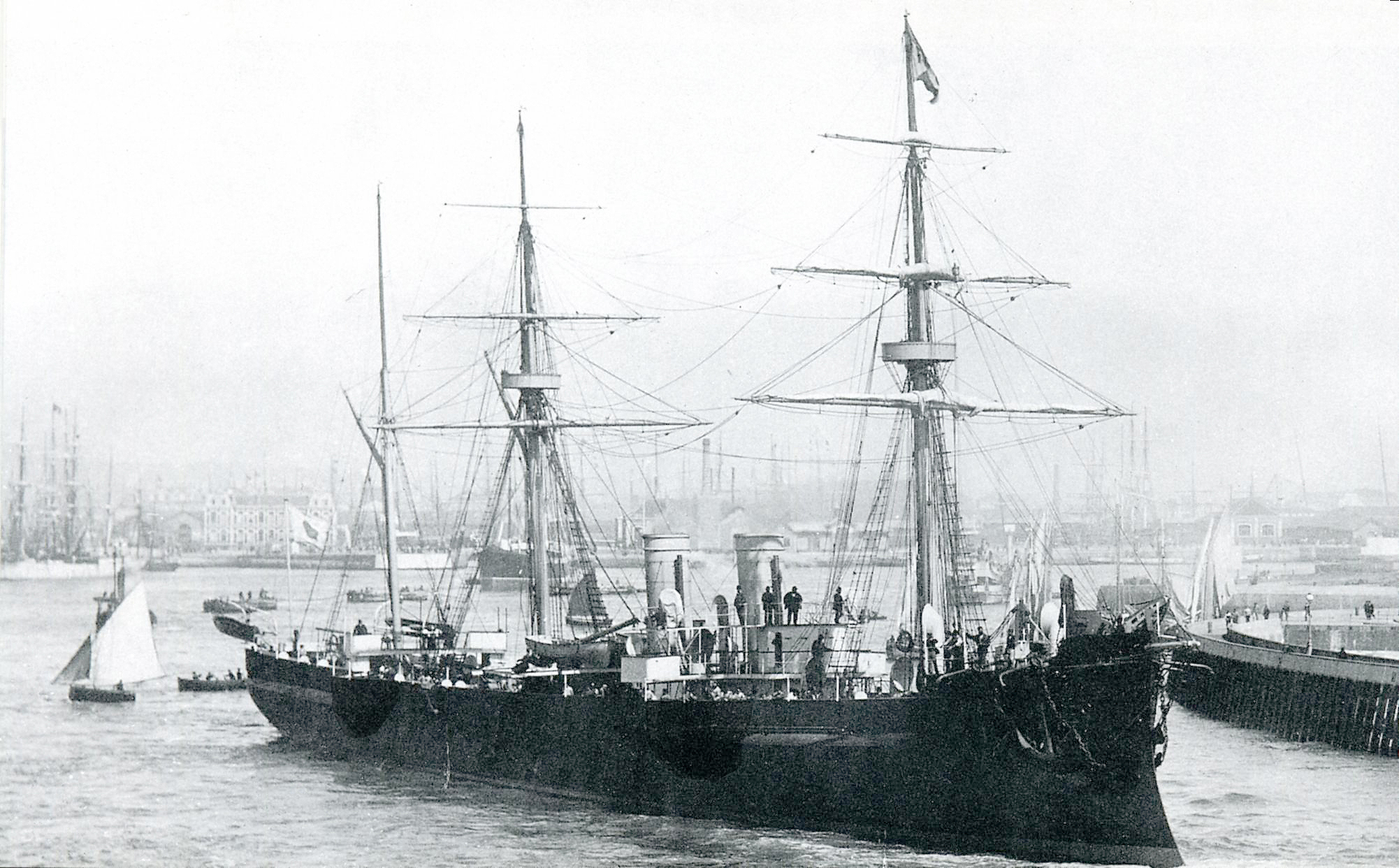
- Unebi departing Le Havre, October 1886

Class overview
- Operators: Imperial Japanese Navy
- Preceded by: Naniwa class
- Succeeded by: Matsushima class
- Planned: 1
- Completed: 1
- Lost: 1

History
- Name: Unebi
- Namesake: Mount Unebi
- Builder: Forges et Chantiers de la Méditerranée, Le Havre, France
- Laid down: 27 May 1884
- Launched: 6 April 1886
- Completed: 18 October 1886
- Stricken: 19 October 1887
- Fate: Lost at sea, December 1886

General characteristics
- Type: Protected cruiser
- Displacement: 3,615 long tons (3,673 t)
- Length: 98 m (321 ft 6 in) w/l
- Beam: 13.1 m (43 ft 0 in)
- Draught: 5.72 m (18 ft 9 in)
- Installed power: 6 cylindrical boilers; 5,500 ihp (4,100 kW)
- Propulsion: 2 shafts; 2 double-expansion steam engines
- Sail plan: Barque-rigged
- Speed: 17.5–18.5 knots (32.4–34.3 km/h; 20.1–21.3 mph)
- Complement: 400
- Armament: 4 × single 24 cm (9.4 in) guns; 7 × single 15 cm (5.9 in) guns; 2 × single 57 mm (2.2 in) guns; 10 × quadruple 25 mm (1 in) guns; 4 × dectuple 11 mm (0.43 in) machine guns; 4 × 356 mm (14 in) torpedo tubes
- Armour: Deck: 63 mm (2.5 in); Conning tower: 22 mm (0.9 in)

Unebi (畝傍) was a protected cruiser built in France for the Imperial Japanese Navy (IJN) by Forges et Chantiers de la Méditerranée during the 1880s as the Japanese were not yet able to build warships of her size in Japan. Completed in 1886, the ship disappeared somewhere between Singapore and Japan on her delivery voyage with the loss of all hands.

== Background ==
In the early 1880s, Navy Minister Kawamura Sumiyoshi was struggling to reconcile his desire for expansion in the face of the growing Chinese Beiyang Fleet with Japan's limited financial resources. Two developments offered Kawamura a way to resolve his problems. First, the French development of the Jeune École naval doctrine which emphasized the use of cheap torpedo boats and heavily armed light ships to offset an opponent's superiority in expensive, heavily armed and armored battleships. Second, the design of heavily armed, lightly protected cruisers by George Rendel of Armstrong Whitworth, as exemplified by the Chilean cruiser Esmeralda, fit the Jeune École doctrine. Rendel believed that his ships could be battleship destroyers as their higher speed would allow them to dictate the range at which the battle was fought or they could disengage at need.

After Chile rejected Kawamura’s attempt to buy Esmeralda in September 1883, he ordered two improved versions—the *Naniwa* class—from Armstrong Whitworth in March 1884, as Japan was not yet capable of building such ships itself. Seeking a third cruiser comparable to the British-built vessels, he sent a representative to France to obtain a similar design and a contract was signed on 22 May 1884. Contemporary French and Japanese sources indicate that the offer accepted by the Imperial Japanese Navy came from Forges et Chantiers de la Méditerranée (FCM), Graville–Le Havre,

== Description ==
Compared with the preceding British-built Naniwa-class cruisers, Unebi was an old-fashioned design, fully rigged for auxiliary sail propulsion. The ship had a length between perpendiculars of 98 meters (321 ft 6 in) with a beam of 13.1 meters (43 ft 0 in) and had a mean draft of 5.72 meters (18 ft 9 in). She displaced 3,615 metric tons (3,558 long tons) and had a crew of 400 officers and enlisted men. Unebi's hull was fitted with a ram and it had a considerable amount of tumblehome amidships to increase the traverse of the main guns and reduce blast damage from them firing close to the hull. While her metacentric height was never measured before her loss, it is believed that it may have been very low which would rendered her stability precarious. Reports from the ship on her delivery voyage discussed her excessive rolling motions.

Unebi had two horizontal double-expansion steam engines, each driving one shaft, using steam supplied by six cylindrical boilers. The engines were rated at 5,500 indicated horsepower (4,101 kW) and gave the ship a speed of 17.5–18.5 knots (32.4–34.3 km/h; 20.1–21.3 mph). The ship carried enough coal to give her a range of 5,600 nautical miles (10,400 km; 6,400 mi) at 10 knots (19 km/h; 12 mph). Unebi was fitted with a full barque rig with three masts and had a sail area of 1,120 square meters (12,100 sq ft).

=== Armament and protection ===
The ship's main battery consisted of four Krupp 35-caliber 24 cm (9.4 in) guns, mounted on the upper deck in single mounts sponsoned out over the side of the hull. Most of her secondary armament of seven Krupp 35-caliber 15 cm (5.9 in) guns were mounted amidships on the upper deck, three on each broadside. The remaining gun was mounted as a bow-chaser underneath the short forecastle deck. Defense against torpedo boats was provided by a pair of quick-firing 57 mm (2.2 in) Nordenfelt guns, one mounted on the forecastle and the other on the stern. Short-range defensive weapons consisted of 10 quadruple-barreled 25 mm (1 in) Nordenfelt guns and four 10-barreled 11 mm (0.43 in) Nordenfelt machine guns, distributed about the ship. Unebi was also fitted with four 356 mm (14 in) tubes for Schwartzkopff torpedoes. Her armor was limited to the 63 mm (2.5 in) lower deck that covered the full length of the ship and her conning tower was protected by 22 mm (0.9 in) of armor.

== Construction and loss ==
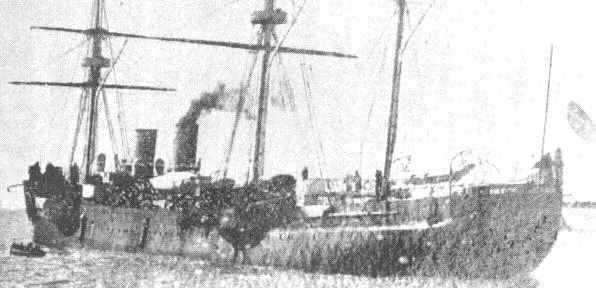
Underway, shortly after departing Le Havre

Unebi, named after Mount Unebi in Nara prefecture was laid down on 27 May 1884 at Forges et Chantiers de la Méditerranée's shipyard in Le Havre, the day before the contract was signed. The ship was launched on 6 April 1886, with Prince Fushimi in attendance and she was completed on 18 October 1886 at a cost of ¥1,812,673, far more than the ¥1,093,000 price in the original contract.

With a mixed crew of Japanese sailors and shipyard employees aboard, Unebi attempted to depart Le Havre for Japan on the 18th, but had to turn back when she ran into a storm that caused her to roll so heavily that her safety was endangered. The ship set sail on the following day and encountered weaker storms in the Mediterranean and after passing through the Suez Canal. A stronger storm caused Unebi to return to Aden, Yemen, where she off-loaded two of her main guns in an effort to improve her stability. After arriving in Singapore, the ship departed on 3 December, bound for Tokyo Bay, where she was expected to arrive on 12 or 13 December. The crew of Unebi consisted of eight Japanese men under Captain Iimure Toshikazu and 76 French men under Lieutenant Fouèvre. On December 3, the ship departed Singapore (scheduled to arrive at Yokohama Port between December 14 and 15). When it departed Singapore, the crew consisted of 79 French nationals, 9 Arab stokers, 7 Japanese porters, and 1 naval student. It then disappeared in the South China Sea. In late December, the ironclad Fuso and Kaimon conducted a surface search from the coast of Tosa to Hachijojima. Other ships in the search, including the Ministry of Communications Lighthouse Bureau's Meiji Maru and Nippon Yusen's Nagato Maru, also participated. Foreign ships also assisted in the search, but no clues were found.

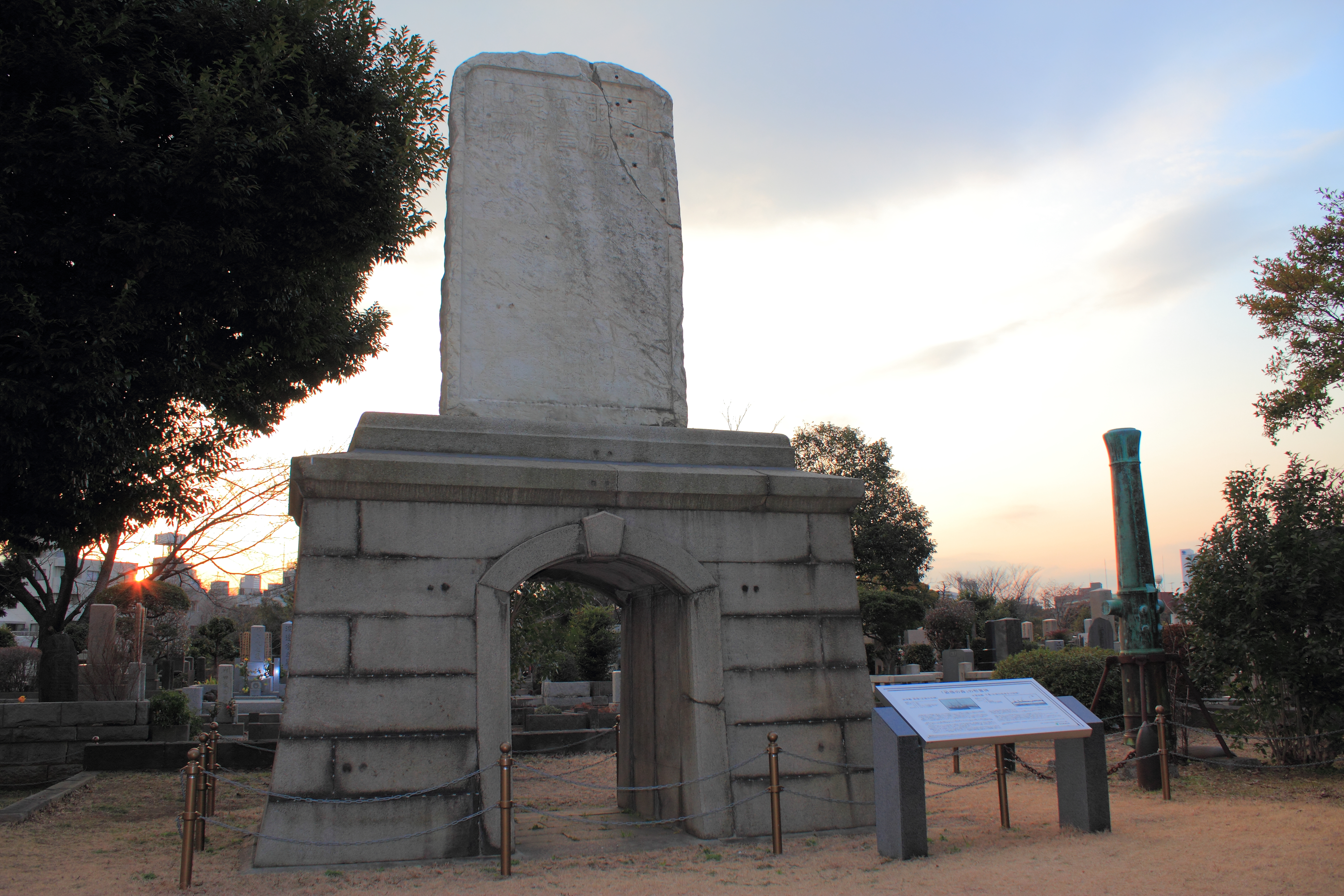
Monument to Unebi and the sunken torpedo gunboat Chishima in Aoyama Cemetery, Tokyo

A single reliable clue emerged unexpectedly around ten years after the ship disappeared: In July 1897, reports in the US newspapers New York Tribune and Morning Times revealed that years earlier, villagers had found the wreckage of a Japanese ship washed up on the Pescadores Islands (which had been under Japanese sovereignty since 1895). Subsequent investigations by the Japanese Navy and police units on the islands revealed that fishermen had indeed found ship wreckage on the beaches around a decade earlier and used it to build wooden huts. During subsequent examinations of the huts, investigators found, among other things, decorated wooden strips and two cabin doors bearing the weathered lettering "Unebi". This was the only trace of the ship ever found. However, it remains unknown to this day where and when the cruiser sank and what caused Unebi's loss. The ship is believed to have been caught in the aftermath of a typhoon in the northeastern South China Sea in mid-December 1886, capsized in the storm due to the top-heavy nature of the ship and sank within a very short time with the entire crew of 174 men. To this day, it remains one of the worst disasters to have occurred in the Japanese Navy in peacetime.; the most popular theory is that the design was top-heavy due to its excessive armament and was unstable in rough weather. Unebi was officially declared lost with all hands and stricken from the navy list on 19 October 1887. A memorial monument to the missing crew of Unebi is located at Aoyama Cemetery in Tokyo.

The insurance settlement of ¥1,245,309 was applied to the construction of the cruiser Chiyoda. However, the Imperial Japanese Navy was reluctant to continue working with French shipyards after the Unebi disaster, and placed its order for the French-designed Chiyoda with John Brown & Company in Scotland.
