= Şevket Şahintaş =

Şevket Şahintaş is a photographer from Istanbul, Turkey.

A car mechanic by training, Şahintaş has always worked as a taxicab driver. In 2004, he started taking photographs on his nighttime tours, portraying prostitutes, alcoholics, and the homeless in Istanbul.

A passenger became aware of the photographs and helped with their publication on the Internet. Şahintaş's photographs have since become the subject of TV reports and of expositions, most recently in Saint Petersburg, Russia, where a vernissage about contemporary Turkish photography was dedicated to Şahintaş. He continues to work as a taxi driver, stating to journalists that he is not interested in professional photography.
