= Forges et Chantiers de la Gironde =

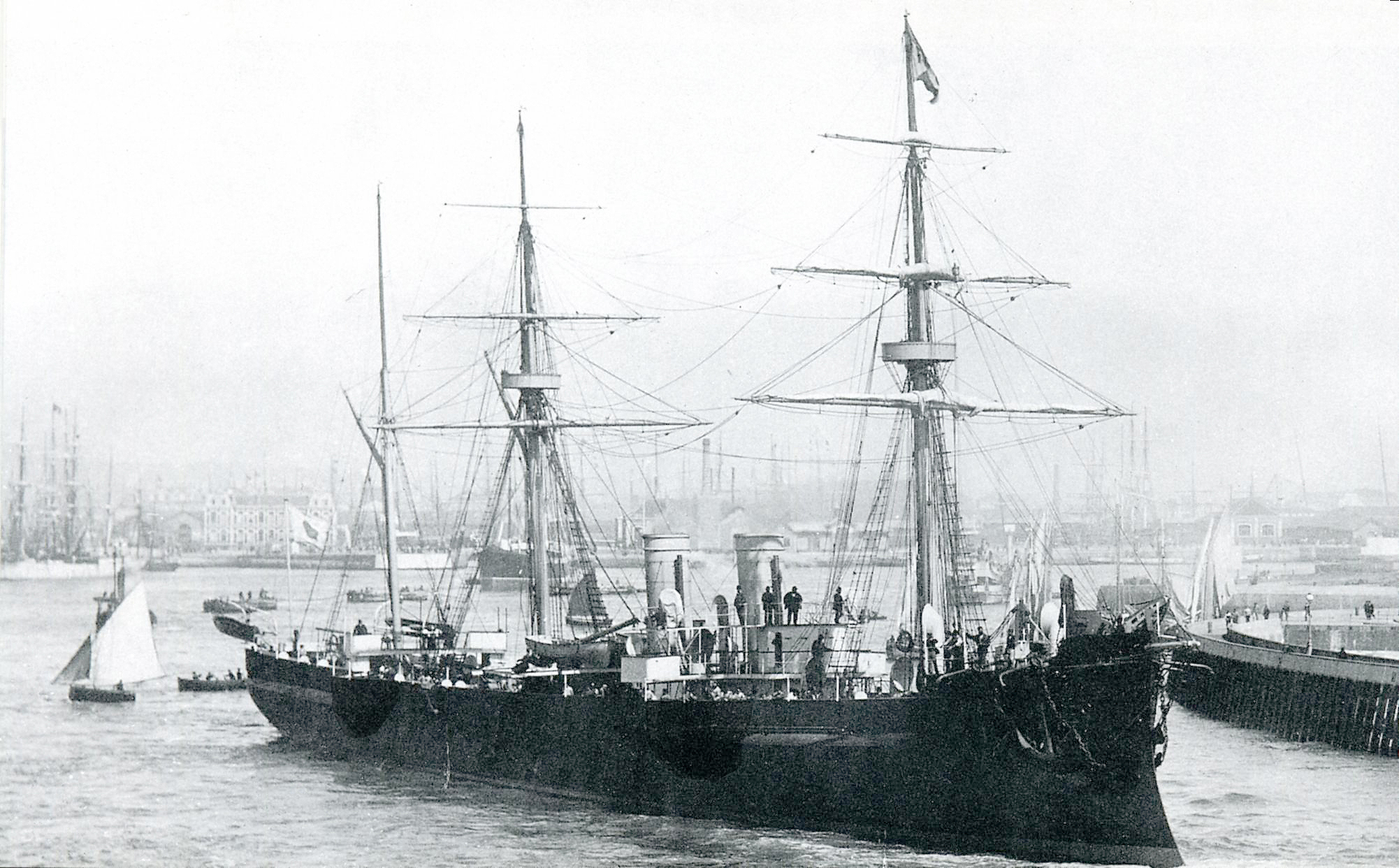
The Japanese cruiser Unebi was built by the Forges et Chantiers de la Gironde in 1886.

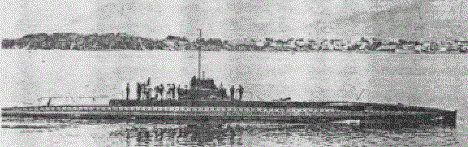
French submarine Henri Fournier, built at Gironde (initially ordered by Romania)

Forges et Chantiers de la Gironde (literally translated Forges and dockyards of the Gironde) was a French shipbuilder at Lormont near Bordeaux on the Gironde estuary. The company was previously called Usine de construction navale Chaigneau et Bichon, then Chantiers et Ateliers de la Gironde S.A. Ets Schneider, before becoming Forges et Chantiers de la Gironde. It is today the Construction Navale de Bordeaux (CNB).

== Ships ==
The company built naval ships. Its products included the Ottoman Navy Lütf-ü Celil-class ironclads Lütf-ü Celil and Hifz-ur Rahman, the Unebi (1886) and Ottoman Samsun class destroyers Basra, Samsun, Taşoz and Yarhisar (all 1907). For the French Navy its ships included the First World War sloop Dédaigneuse (1916), Bougainville-class avisos Bougainville (1931) and Rigault de Genouilly (1932) and the La Galissonnière-class cruiser Gloire (1933).

In June 1939 the yard had launched another Bougainville class aviso, the Beautemps Beaupré. At the Fall of France she was still being completed at the yard so on 24 June 1940 the French took her out into the Gironde and scuttled her to prevent her from being captured. Another Bougainville class aviso, La Pérouse, was on order at the time but was cancelled.

On 11 November 1939 the French government ordered twelve Chamois-class avisos including three from Forges et Chantiers de la Gironde. After the Fall of France the company abandoned construction of two of these, La Rieuse and La Sérieuse, and suspended work on the third, which had been intended to be La Preneuse. Work on her resumed after 1945 and her intended name was changed to Commandant Ducuing in 1946. However, construction was finally abandoned in 1948.

== Sources ==
- Le Masson, Henri (1969). The French Navy. Navies of the Second World War. Vol. 2. London: MacDonald & Co. (Publishers) Ltd. ISBN 9780356023847.
