= Ottoman ironclad Lütf-ü Celil =

Ironclad warship of the Ottoman Navy

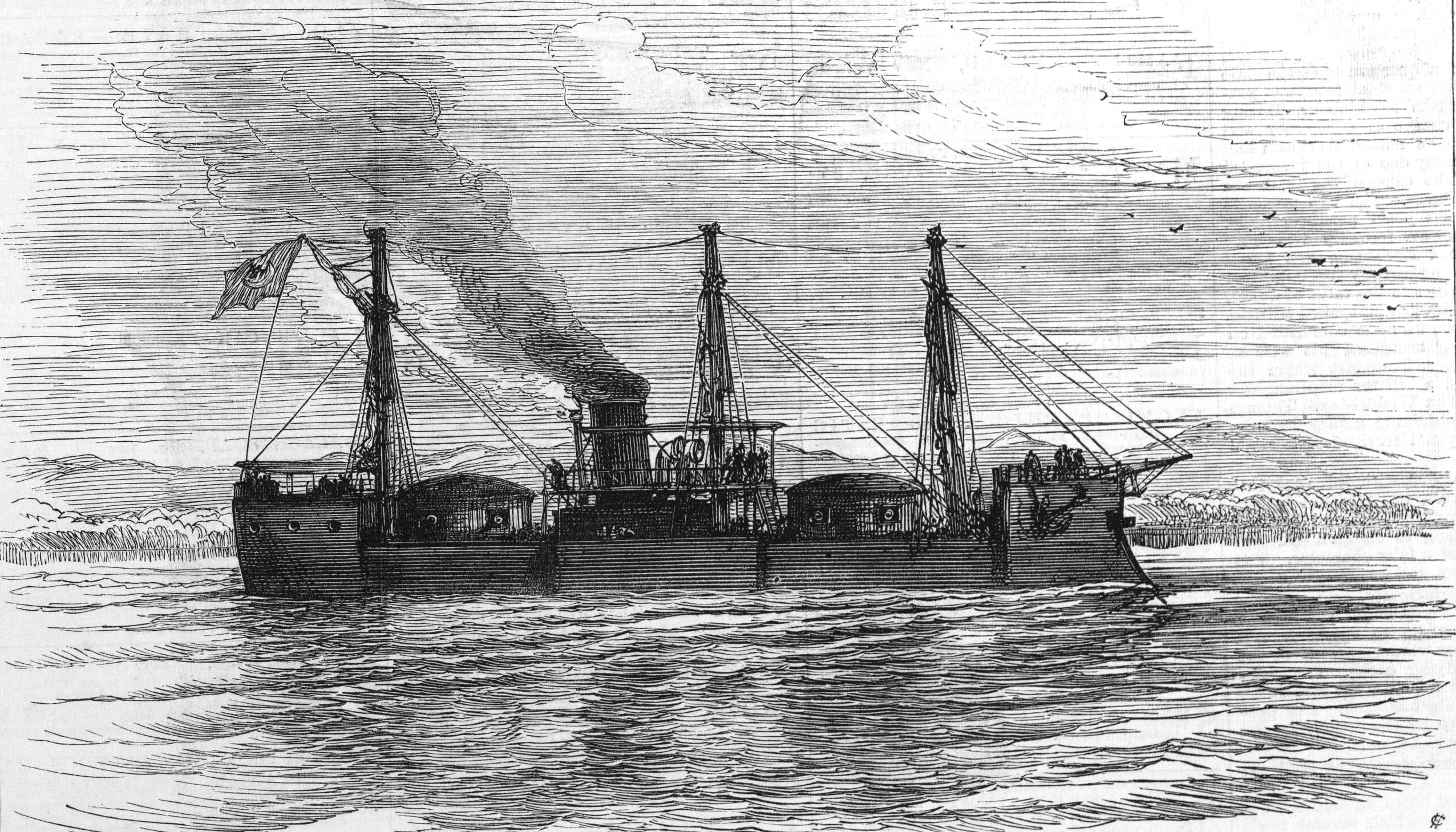
- Illustration of Lütf-ü Celil

History

Ottoman Empire
- Name: Lütf-ü Celil
- Namesake: "Divine Grace"
- Ordered: 1867
- Builder: Forges et Chantiers de la Gironde
- Laid down: 1868
- Launched: 1869
- Commissioned: March 1870
- Fate: Sunk by Russian artillery, 11 May 1877

General characteristics
- Class & type: Lütf-ü Celil class
- Displacement: 2,540 t (2,500 long tons)
- Length: 64.4 m (211 ft 3 in) (loa)
- Beam: 13.6 m (44 ft 7 in)
- Draft: 4.4 m (14 ft 5 in)
- Installed power: 2 × locomotive boilers; 2,000 ihp (1,500 kW)
- Propulsion: 1 × compound steam engine; 2 × screw propellers
- Speed: 12 knots (22 km/h; 14 mph)
- Complement: 12 officers; 110 enlisted men
- Armament: 2 × 229 mm (9 in) Armstrong guns; 2 × 178 mm (7 in) Armstrong guns
- Armor: Belt: 140 mm (5.5 in); Turrets: 140 mm

Lütf-ü Celil (Ottoman Turkish: Divine Grace) was an ironclad warship of the Ottoman Navy, the lead ship of the Lütf-ü Celil class. Originally ordered by the Khedivate of Egypt, an autonomous vassal state of the Ottoman Empire, the central Ottoman government forced Egypt to surrender Lütf-ü Celil while she was still under construction at the French Forges et Chantiers de la Gironde shipyard. Lütf-ü Celil saw action during the first weeks of the Russo-Turkish War in 1877, where she operated on the Danube to try to prevent Russian forces from crossing the river. While on patrol on 11 May, she engaged a Russian artillery battery that scored a hit on the ship's boiler room, causing an explosion that destroyed the ship and killed most of her crew.

== Design ==
Lütf-ü Celil was 64.4 m (211 ft 3 in) long overall, with a beam of 13.6 m (44 ft 7 in) and a draft of 4.4 m (14 ft 5 in). The hull was constructed with iron, incorporated ram bow, and displaced 2,540 metric tons (2,500 long tons) normally and 1,741 t (1,714 long tons) BOM. She had a crew of 12 officers and 110 enlisted men.

The ship was powered by a single horizontal compound steam engine which drove two screw propellers. Steam was provided by two coal-fired locomotive boilers that were trunked into a single funnel amidships. The engine was rated at 2,000 indicated horsepower (1,500 kW) and produced a top speed of 12 knots (22 km/h; 14 mph), though by 1877 she was only capable of 10 kn (19 km/h; 12 mph). Lütf-ü Celil carried 300 t (300 long tons; 330 short tons) of coal. A supplementary barque rig was also fitted.

Lütf-ü Celil was armed with a battery of two 229 mm (9 in) rifled, muzzle loading Armstrong guns and two 178 mm (7 in) Armstrong guns, each pair mounted in a revolving gun turret, both of which were on the centerline. The 229 mm guns were placed in the forward turret and the turret for the 178 mm guns was located aft of the main mast. The ship's armored belt consisted of wrought iron that was 140 mm (5.5 in) thick and was reduced to 120 mm (4.6 in) toward the bow and stern. Above the main belt, a strake of armor 76 mm (3 in) thick protected the turret bases, magazines, and machinery spaces. The turrets were protected by 140 mm of iron plating.

== Service history ==
Illustration of Lütf-ü Celil exploding, after having been hit by Russian artillery fire

Lütf-ü Celil, meaning "Divine Grace", was ordered from the Forges et Chantiers de la Gironde shipyard in Lormont in 1867 and was laid down the following year. The ship had originally been ordered by the Khedivate of Egypt, an autonomous tributary state of the Ottoman Empire, but Egyptian efforts to assert their independence angered Sultan Abdülaziz, who, on 5 June 1867, demanded Egypt surrender all of the ironclads ordered from foreign shipyards. After lengthy negotiations, the vessel was formally transferred to the Ottoman Empire on 29 August 1868. She was launched in 1869 and completed for sea trials in 1870. The ship was commissioned into the Ottoman fleet in March that year.

Upon completion, Lütf-ü Celil and the other ironclads then being built in Britain and France were sent to Crete to assist in the aftermath of the Cretan Revolt of 1866–1869. During this period, the Ottoman fleet, under Hobart Pasha, remained largely inactive, with training confined to reading translated British instruction manuals. Lütf-ü Celil was assigned to the II Squadron of the Asiatic Fleet, along with her sister ship Hifz-ur Rahman and the ironclads Avnillah and Muin-i Zafer. Early in the ship's career, the Ottoman ironclad fleet was activated every summer for short cruises from the Golden Horn to the Bosporus to ensure their propulsion systems were in operable condition. In 1875, the ship received a single 120 mm (4.7 in) gun manufactured by Krupp.

The Ottoman fleet began mobilizing in September 1876 to begin to prepare for a conflict with Russia, as tensions with the country had been growing for several years, an insurrection had begun in Ottoman Bosnia in mid-1875, and Serbia had declared war on the Ottoman Empire in July 1876. The Russo-Turkish War began on 24 April 1877 with a Russian declaration of war. At the start of the war, Lütf-ü Celil and Hifz-ur Rahman were assigned to the Danube Squadron, where they were tasked with preventing Russian forces from crossing the river. On 11 May, while cruising in the Danube off Izmail, the ship was attacked by Russian artillery consisting of 6-inch (152 mm) mortars and 25-pounder rifled guns. One of the shells struck the vessel, probably in the boiler room, where it caused a large explosion that destroyed the ship. The river monitor Feth-ül İslam picked up twenty men, but most of her crew, some 160 officers and men, were killed in the explosion.
