= Belkıs Sevket =

Activist, music teacher, child trainer

Belkıs Şevket
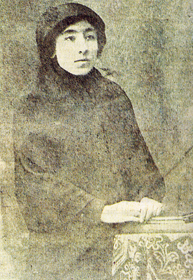
- Citizenship: Turkish
- Occupation(s): Activist, music teacher, child trainer
- Known for: Being the first Turkish woman to fly

Belkıs Şevket or Belkıs Şevket Hanım, was the first Turkish woman to fly on December 1, 1913. She was also an activist. Her grandfather was one of the viziers of Ali Namık Pasha. She was the daughter of Şevket Bey who was the son of Ata Pasha or according to other sources she was the daughter of Ata Pasha. Belkıs Şevket Hanım was also a child trainer, Music teacher, and writer. She was also moderately proficient in the English language.

== The First Turkish Flying Woman ==
Some Turkish women in Istanbul established the Ottoman Defense of Rights Association (Association for the Defense of the Rights of Women) in 1913 after the declaration of the Second Constitutional Monarchy. A journal called Women's World was also issued by that society. Belkıs Şevket Hanım was an active member of the association as well, and she was one of the contributors of Kadın Dünyası magazine. Through the association, she was making efforts both to make the propaganda of Turkish women and to collect aid that could give a plane to the Turkish Army. She asked Mesadet Bedirhen's husband, who was a member of the association, to go to the Directorate of Aircraft School in Safraköy and ask the school manager regarding the issue of her flying a plane by herself. Süreyya Bey did not break this request and went to the School of Aircraft. Veli Bey, the director of the Aircraft School, however, claimed that he was unable to make a decision on the matter and that authorization should be obtained from the First Corps Command.

Upon this, the association consulted the Deputy Commander of the First Corps, Cemal Mersinli, and obtained the necessary written permission from the corps commander. With the permission received, planning was made for Belkıs Şevket Hanım to fly on Sunday, November 30, 1913, or the next day if the weather was not suitable. However, the flight could not be made due to the intermittent rain on Sunday. Therefore, the flight was delayed until Monday, December 1, 1913. In order to be thrown off the plane, Belkıs Hanım printed a basket of cards on behalf of the association with the goal of starting a donation campaign. On this card it said;

"While we are flying on behalf of Ottoman and Islamic Women from the members of the Ottoman Defense Society and the Women's World, we would like to give an airplane to our esteemed army under the name "Women's World".

On Monday, 1 December 1913, the association president and the members departed for Yeşilköy. They arrived at the area around 13:00. There were local and foreign press members in the area along with the audience. The plane Belkıs Şevket Hanım would take on was a Deperdussin type aircraft and the aircraft would be piloted by Lieutenant Fethi Bey. The plane's name was "Ottoman" and it was an open-top single-engine aircraft. Belkıs Şevket Hanım gave the crowd a brief, short speech, and the plane took off at around 15:14. A flight of about 200 meters over Şişli, Hürriyet Monument, Üsküdar and Kadıköy took place. Belkıs Şevket Hanım threw the prepared cards to the crowd while flying. The complete flight lasted fifteen minutes.

However, the donation campaign did not get the desired attention. During the campaign, which lasted for a total of three weeks, 2622 Kuruş was collected. However, Belkıs Şevket Hanım's flight attracted attention in the foreign press. For instance, the phrase "in a bold gesture that should be taken into consideration" was used in the news of the Berliner Tageblatt (or BT) newspaper published in Germany.

Later, her photo was displayed at the Military Museum as an example of female bravery. In addition, at the time, a newly launched cologne was called "Belkıs Cologne Water".
