= Strake =

Structure in watercraft construction

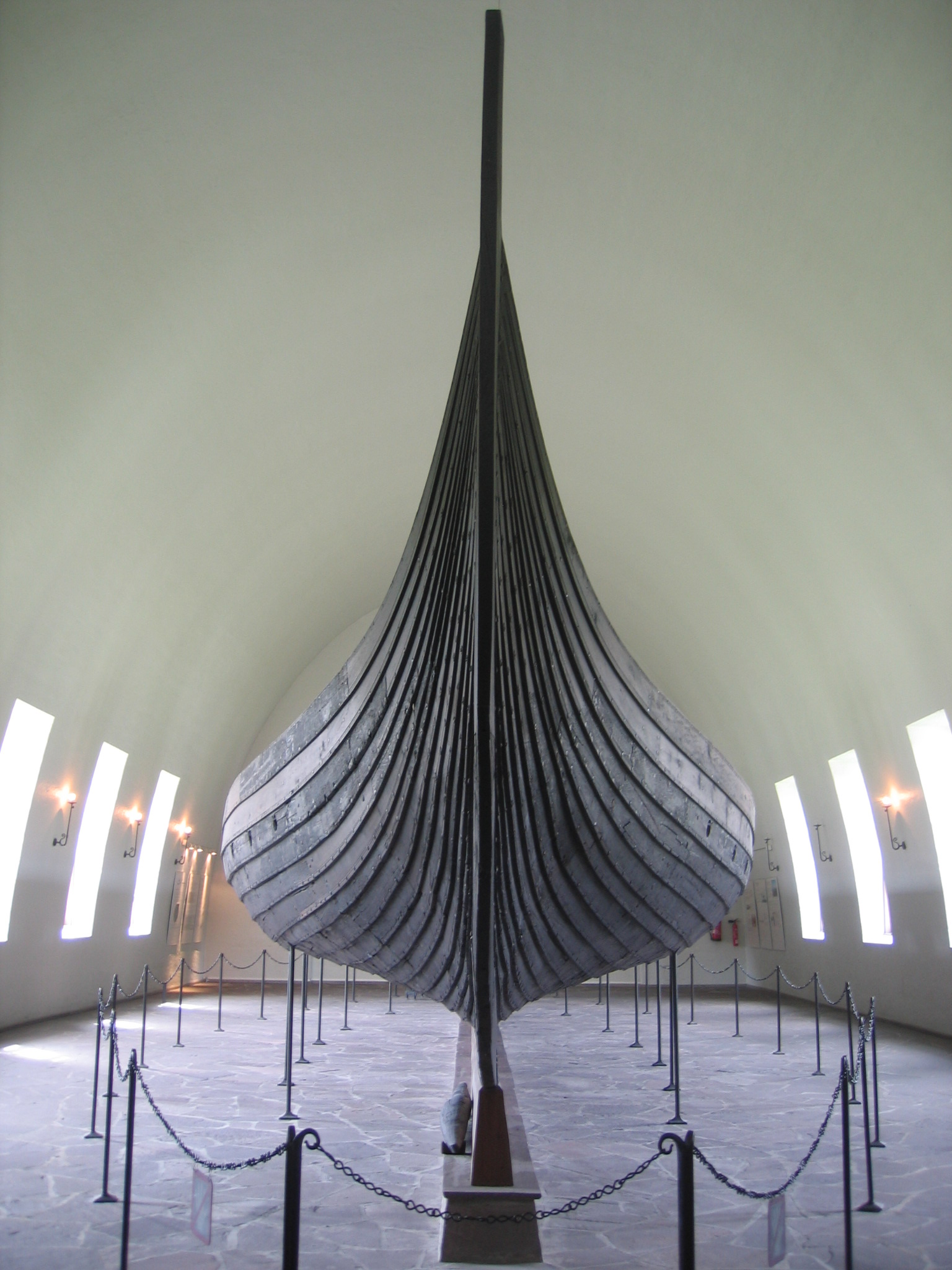
A clinker-built Viking longship, whose overlapping planks constitute "strakes".

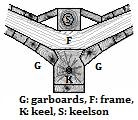
Garboard strakes and related near-keel members

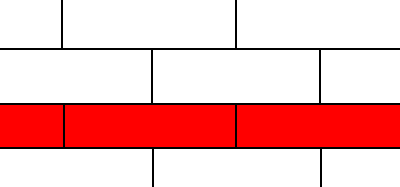
Diagram of typical modern metal-hulled ship’s exterior plating, with a single strake highlighted in red

On a vessel's hull, a strake is a longitudinal course of planking or plating which runs from the boat's stempost (at the bows) to the sternpost or transom (at the rear). The garboard strakes are the two immediately adjacent to the keel on each side.

The word derives from traditional wooden boat building methods, used in both carvel and clinker construction. In a metal ship, a strake is a course of plating.

== Construction ==
In small boats strakes may be single continuous pieces of wood. In larger wooden vessels strakes typically comprise several planks which are either scarfed, or butt-jointed and reinforced with a butt block. Where the transverse sections of the vessel's shape are fuller, the strakes are wider; they taper toward the ends.

In a riveted steel ship, the strakes were usually lapped and joggled (one strake given projections to match indentions in the one adjoining), but where a smoother finish was sought they might be riveted on a butt strap, though this was weaker. In modern welded construction, the plates are normally butt-welded with full penetration welds all round to adjoining plates within the strake and to adjoining strakes.

== Terminology ==
In boat and ship construction, strakes immediately adjacent to either side of the keel are known as the garboard strakes or A strakes. The next two are the first broad or B strake and second broad or C strake. Working upward come the bottom strakes, lowers, bilge strakes, topside strakes, and uppers also named sequentially as the D strake, E strake, etc. The uppermost along the topsides is called the sheer strake. Strakes are joined to the stem by their hood ends.

A rubbing strake was traditionally built in just below a carvel sheer strake. It was much less broad but thicker than other strakes so that it projected and took any rubbing against piers or other boats when the boat was in use. In clinker boats, the rubbing strake was applied to the outside of the sheer strake. Many current pleasure craft reflect this history in that they have a mechanically attached (and therefore replaceable) rub rail at the location formerly occupied by a rubbing strake, often doubling to cover the joint between a GRP hull and its innerliner. Inflatable dinghies and RIBs usually have a rubbing strake (typically a glued-on rubber extrusion) at the edge.

A "stealer" is a short strake employed to reduce the width of plank required where the girth of the hull increases or to accommodate a tuck in the shape. It is commonly employed in carvel and iron/steel shipbuilding, but very few clinker craft use them.
