= Ottoman fleet organisation during the Balkan Wars =

This list includes fleet organisations of the Ottoman Navy during the Balkan Wars.

== Dispositions on October 10, 1912 ==
On October 10, 1912, the naval ships of the Ottoman Navy was disposed as follows:

Haydarpaşa, Constantinople (present day: Istanbul)

- Barbaros Hayreddin, Turgut Reis, Mecidiye

Golden Horn (shipyard), Constantinople

- Gayret-i Vataniye, Berkefşan, Peleng-i Derya, Berk-i Satvet, Draç, Nur-ül Bahir

Golden Horn, Constantinople

- İclâliye, Basra

Dolmabahçe, Constantinople

- Ertuğrul

Kabataş, Constantinople

- Istanbul (tug)

Arnavutköy, Constantinople

- Söğütlü

Bosporus-Büyükdere, Constantinople

- Yadigar-i Millet, Muavenet-i Milliye, Nümune-i Hamiyet, Samsun, Taşoz, Sivrihisar, Demirhisar, Musul, Kütahya, Zuhâf, Nevşehir, Tirimüjgan

Sinop

- Hamidiye

Çanakkale

- Mesudiye, Asar-i Tevfik, Yarhisar, Hamidabad, Akhisar

Preveza

- Antalya, Tokad, No. 9, No. 11

Salonika (present day: Thessaloniki)

- Feth-i Bülend, Fuad

Smyrna (present day: İzmir)

- Muin-i Zafer, Yunus, Timsah, İzzeddin, Trabzon

Suez

- Peyk-i Şevket, Beyrut, Malatya, Taşköprü, Yozgat

== Fleet organisation on October 16, 1912 ==
On October 16, 1912, the Ottoman Navy was structured as follows:

- Bosporus Fleet (Commander: Kalyon Kaptanı Tahir Bey)
  - Barbaros Hayreddin (Korvet Kaptanı Enver Hakkı Efendi), Turgut Reis (Korvet Kaptanı İsmail Ahmer Efendi), Muâvenet-i Millîye (Birinci Sınıf Yüzbaşı Galatalı Ali Bey), Yâdigâr-ı Millet (Birinci Sınıf Yüzbaşı Fahri Cemal Bey), Nümûne-i Hamiyet (Korvet Kaptanı Hamdi Mahmud Bey), Samsun (Birinci Sınıf Yüzbaşı Osman İzzet Bey), Basra (Birinci Sınıf Yüzbaşı Cemal Ali Bey), Taşoz, Musul, Akhisar, Sultanhisar, Sivrihisar, Zuhaf, Nevşehir
- Derdanelles Fleet (Commander: Korvet Kaptanı Tevfik Bey)
  - Mesudiye (Korvet Kaptanı Tevfik Bey), Âsâr-ı Tevfik (Korvet Kaptanı Mehmed Emin Bey), Hamidabad
- Black Sea Headquarters (Commander: Birinci Sınıf Yüzbaşı Hüseyin Rauf Bey)
  - Hamidiye (Birinci Sınıf Yüzbaşı Hüseyin Rauf Bey), Mecidiye (Korvet Kaptanı Arif Nebil Bey)
- Tersâne-i Âmire
  - Berk-i Satvet, Gayret-i Vatâniye, Yarhisar, Berk Efşan, Kütahya, Draç, Demirhisar

== Fleet organisation on December 19, 1912 ==
On December 19, 1912, the Ottoman Navy was structured as follows:

- Armoured Warship Division (Commander: Kalyon Kaptanı Ramiz Bey)
  - Barbasos Hayreddin, Turgut Reis, Mesudiye, Âsâr-ı Tevfik, Demirhisar, Sultanhisar, Sivrihisar, Hamidabad
- 1st Destroyer Division (Commander: Birinci Sınıf Yüzbaşı Hüseyin Rauf Bey)
  - Berk-i Satvet, Yâdigâr-ı Millet, Muâvenet-i Millîye, Taşoz, Basra
- 2nd Destroyer Division (Commander: Yüzbaşı Hakkı Eşref Efendi)
  - Mecidiye, Nümûne-i Hamiyet, Gayret-i Vatâniye, Yarhisar
- 3rd Division (Commander: Korvet Kaptanı İsmail Bey)
  - Tîr-i Müjgan (workshop ship), İntibâh (salvage tug), Reşid Paşa (hospital ship), Samsun, Akhisar, Samsun (tug)

== Fleet organisation on December 20, 1912 ==
On December 20, 1912, the Ottoman Navy was structured as follows:

- Armoured Warship Division (Commander: Kalyon Kaptanı Ramiz Bey)
  - Barbasos Hayreddin, Turgut Reis, Mesudiye, Demirhisar, Sultanhisar, Sivrihisar, Hamidabad, Reşid Paşa (hospital ship)
- 1st Destroyer Division (Commander: Birinci Sınıf Yüzbaşı Hüseyin Rauf Bey)
  - Mecidiye, Muâvenet-i Millîye, Gayret-i Vatâniye, Nümûne-i Hamiyet
- 2nd Destroyer Division (Commander: Yüzbaşı Hakkı Eşref Efendi)
  - Berk-i Satvet, Taşoz, Yarhisar, Basra
- 3rd Division (Commander: Korvet Kaptanı İsmail Bey)
  - Âsâr-ı Tevfik, Samsun, Tîr-i Müjgan (workshop ship), İntibâh (salvage tug), Samsun (tug)
