= Italo-Turkish War order of battle: Ottoman Navy =

This list includes fleet organisations of the Ottoman Navy during the Italo-Turkish War.

== Fleet organisation on October 29, 1911 ==
On October 29, 1911, the Ottoman Navy was structured as follows:

Fleet (Commander: Kalyon Kaptanı Tahir)

- Barbaros Hayreddin (Korvet Kaptanı Enver Hakkı Bey), Turgut Reis (Korvet Kaptanı Arif), Mesudiye, Âsâr-ı Tevfik (drydocked), Hamidiye (Birinci Sınıf Yüzbaşı Hüseyin Rauf), Mecidiye (Yüzbaşı Arif Nebil)

Flotilla (Korvet Kaptanı Hakkı)

- Muavenet-i Milliye (Yüzbaşı Sabri), Gayret-i Vataniye (Yüzbaşı Sabri), Nümune-i Hamiyet (Yüzbaşı Ali Riza), Yadigar-i Millet (Yüzbaşı Fahri Aziz), Basra (Yüzbaşı Ali Riza), Samsun (Yüzbaşı Şükrü), Yarhisar (Yüzbaşı Osman)

Smyrna Detachment (Yüzbaşı Hikmet)

- Muin-i Zafer, Yunus, Selânik, Timsah, Izzeddin, Roma, Arşipel, Trabzon

Salonika Detachment (Korvet Kaptanı Bekir Reşid)

- Feth-i Bülend, Fuad, Selânik, Şürat, Teshilat, Katerin

Tripolitania Detachment (Korvet Kaptanı Ahmer)

- Seyyda-i Derya

Lake Skadar Detachment (Yüzbaşı Yahya)

- Gür, İşkodra

Preveza Detachment (Korvet Kaptanı Tevfik)

- Hamidiye, Alpagot, Tokad, Antalya, Trablus, No. 9, No. 11

Red Sea Detachment (Korvet Kaptanı Hamid)

- Peyk-i Şevket, Ordu, Bafra, Ayintab, Malatya, Gökçedağ, Refahiye, Şipka, Beyrut, Moha, Haliç, Yozgat, Kastamonu, Taşköprü, Bahriye, Ahmer

Beirut Detachment (no naval commander)

- Avnillah, Ankara
