= Ottoman destroyer tender Tirimüjgan =

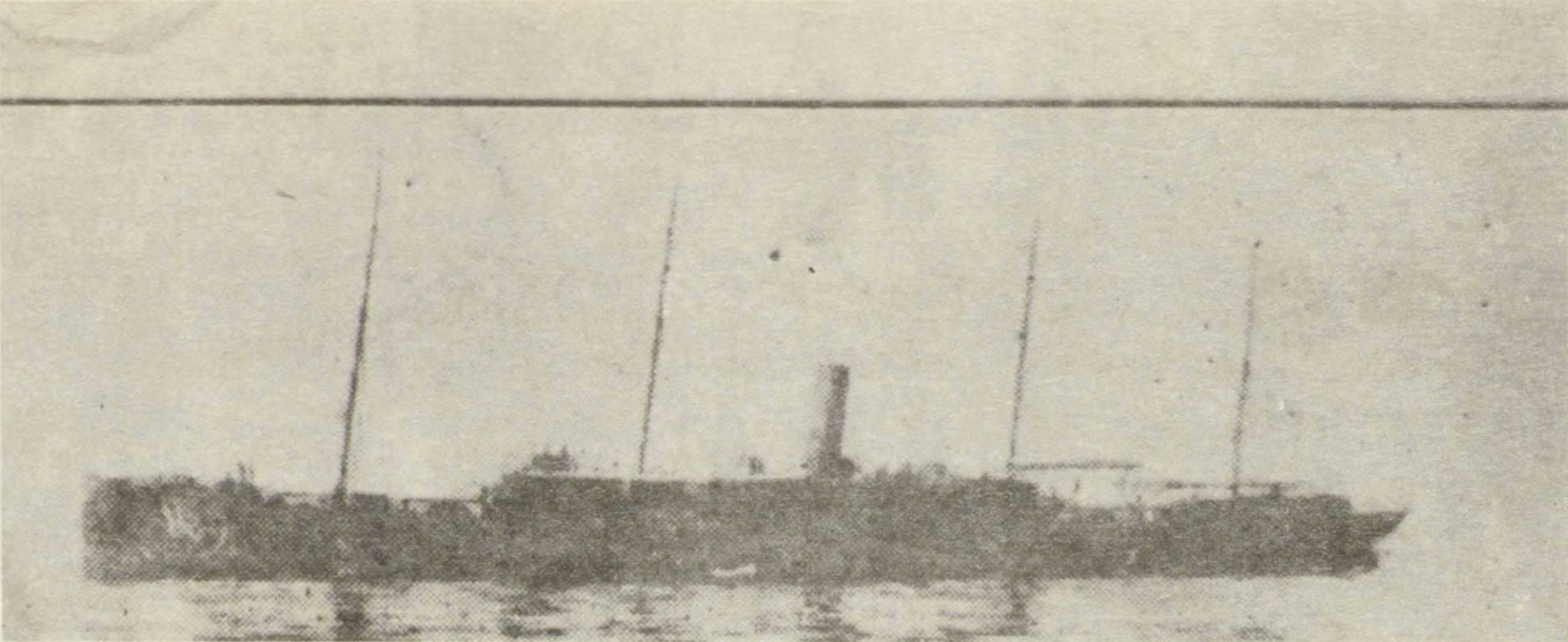
- Tirimüjgan

History

United Kingdom
- Name: Pembroke Castle
- Owner: Union-Castle Line
- Port of registry: London
- Ordered: 1882
- Builder: Barrow Shipbuilding Co., Barrow-in-Furness
- Laid down: 1883
- Launched: May 1883
- Fate: Purchased by İdare-i Mahsusa, 1906

Ottoman Empire
- Name: Tirimüjgan
- Namesake: Tirimüjgan Kadın
- Acquired: 1906
- Commissioned: 1908
- Fate: Ran aground off Cape Bafra at the mouth of the Kızılırmak River, 31 March 1920

General characteristics
- Type: Destroyer tender
- Tonnage: 4,045 GRT
- Length: 121.8 m (399 ft 7 in)
- Beam: 12.9 m (42 ft 4 in)
- Draft: 6.5 m (21 ft 4 in)
- Installed power: 1 compound steam engine, powered by 2 Barrow boilers; 405 ihp (302 kW)
- Propulsion: 1 shaft

Tirimüjgan, formerly Pembroke Castle, was a cargo ship launched in 1883 and purchased by the Ottoman Empire from the United Kingdom in 1906, requisitioned as a destroyer tender and used in the Italo-Turkish War, Balkan Wars and served during World War I.

== Design ==
Built by Barrow Shipbuilding Co. in Barrow-in-Furness, she was 121.8 meters (399 ft 7 in) long overall, 12.9 meters (42 ft 4 in) wide and had a draft of 6.5 meters (21 ft 4 in). Her hull was made of steel. The ship's measured tonnage was 4,045 gross register tons (GRT) and 2,541 net register tons (NRT). The ship was powered by a compound steam engine fed by two Barrow boilers creating 450 indicated horsepower (340 kW), transmitting power to a propeller attached to a single shaft.

== Operational history ==
=== United Kingdom period ===
The ship was ordered from the Barrow Shipbuilding Co. in 1882 under the name of Pembroke Castle. The ship, which started construction in 1883 at Yard 105, was launched in May 1883; sea trials were completed in July of the same year and delivered to the London-based Castle Mail Packet Company. In 1900, she was purchased by the Union-Castle Line, also based in London.

=== Ottoman period ===
In 1906, she was purchased by the Ottoman Empire and placed under the command of the İdare-i Mahsusa. In 1908 she joined the Ottoman Navy as a destroyer tender.

In 1909, she took part in training in May 1909 as part of the reforming program of Admiral Douglas Gamble, commander of the British naval mission in Istanbul. During this training, the flagships Mesudiye, Asar-ı Tevfik and Mecidiye were positioned between Büyükada and Maltepe, while Peyk-i Şevket, Berk-i Satvet, Samsun and her sister Yarhisar guarded the passages between the Princes' Islands. The torpedo boats Draç, Mosul, Kütahya, Alpagot, Hamidiye, Demirhisar and Sivrihisar sailed from Sivriada and joined the fleet, practicing torpedo attacks against larger ships. Representatives of the United Kingdom observed the exercise from Tirimüjgan. Although the exercise was not in realistic combat conditions, it was the first naval exercise of the Ottoman Navy in twenty years. At the end of the exercise, all ships passed in front of the royal yacht Ertuğrul, which was waiting off Sarayburnu. In 1910 she was redeployed as a transport ship.

On 16 December 1912, she formed the 3rd Division together with Reşidpaşa and Intibah and served as a repair ship in the Battle of Elli. She transmitted the semaphores of Samsun and Akhisar, which served as lookouts to the main fleet. On January 10, 1913, she again supported communications during the Ottoman raids on the Aegean. In 1914, she was reclassified as an engineering training ship.

In May 1915, she was assigned as a fixed ammunition depot ship in Çanakkale. In February 1919 she was made a depot ship in Izmir and in April 1919 she was given to the Seyrisefain Administration. On May 14, 1919, during the occupation of Smyrna, Hizir Reis remained in Greek hands for some time together with Nusret and Motor Gunboat No.14. Nusret and Tirimüjgan were released after a few weeks. The Treaty of Sevres included the disarmament of the ship and its conversion into a merchant ship, but the treaty did not enter into force.

On March 31, 1920, while carrying military personnel between Istanbul and Trabzon, she ran aground at the mouth of the Kızılırmak River, off Cape Bafra, and was damaged beyond repair, thus she could not be salvaged. In 2017, the wreck was dismantled and started to be removed to be sold as scrap.
