= Ottoman torpedo boat Draç =

Ottoman torpedo boat

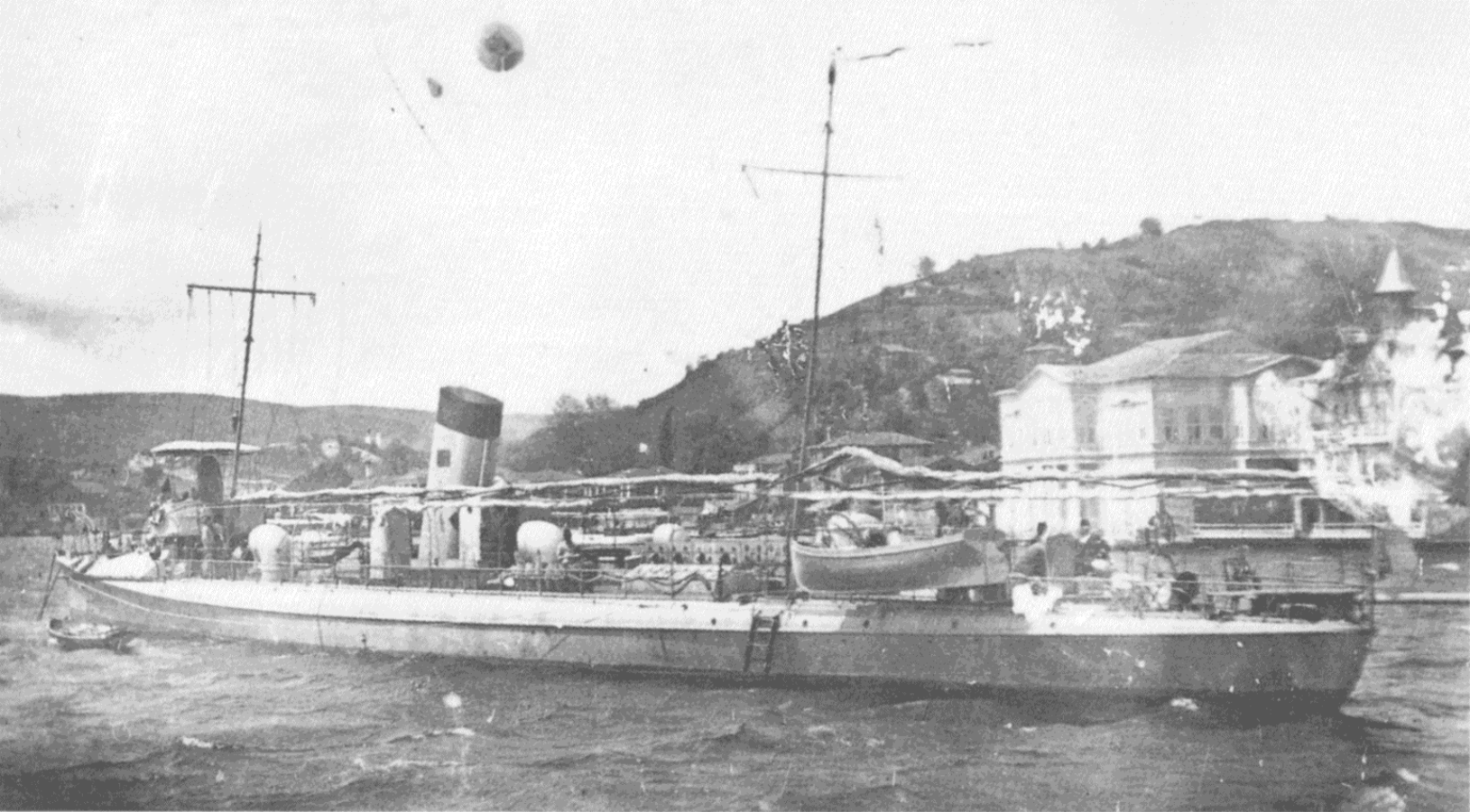
- Draç, 1910

History

Ottoman Empire
- Name: Draç
- Ordered: 1901
- Builder: Ansaldo, Armstrong & Cie, Sestri Ponente
- Yard number: 138
- Laid down: April 1904
- Launched: 1904
- Completed: 6 January 1907
- Commissioned: 8 January 1907
- Fate: Transferred to the Turkish Navy, 1922

Turkey
- Name: Draç
- In service: January 1919–1920, 1924
- Out of service: 1924
- Stricken: 1924
- Fate: Sold, 1926; Scrapped, 1936

General characteristics as built
- Class & type: Antalya-class torpedo boat
- Displacement: 165 t (162 long tons)
- Length: 51.2 m (168 ft 0 in) (o/a)
- Beam: 5.7 m (18 ft 8 in)
- Draft: 1.4 m (4 ft 7 in)
- Installed power: 2 × Ansaldo boilers; 2,700 ihp (2,000 kW)
- Propulsion: 2 × Shafts; 2 × Triple-expansion steam engines
- Speed: 26 knots (48 km/h; 30 mph)
- Complement: 4 officers, 26 enlisted men
- Armament: 2 × 65 mm (2.6 in) guns; 2 × 450 mm (18 in) torpedo tubes

Draç was a torpedo boat of the Ottoman Navy that entered service in 1907. She took part in the Balkan Wars and World War I.

Ordered in 1901, construction of the torpedo boat began in April 1904 in Genoa by Ansaldo, Armstrong & Cie. Launched in 1904 and sea trials began on 1905. After delivery on 29 November 1906, she joined the Ottoman Navy on 8 January 1907. During World War I, she performed various duties such as minesweeping, minelaying and patrolling. On 27 June 1915 she ran aground in Şarköy. She was decommissioned in October 1918. In April 1919, she was recommissioned for a while for anti-smuggling operations. She was decommissioned again in 1920. In 1924, she was re-commissioned for a while before being decommissioned again and sold. In 1926, her hull was used as a work barge in Gölcük. She was eventually dismantled in 1936.

== Design ==
Draç was built by Ansaldo, Armstrong & Cie at Sestri Ponente at Yard 138. She was 51.2 meters (168 ft 0 in) long overall, 5.7 m (18 ft 8 in) wide and her draft was 1.4 m (4 ft 7 in). Her hull was made of steel. Her displacement was 165 t (162 long tons). Her crew, which consisted of 4 officers and 26 sailors as built, consisted of 39 Turks and 4 Germans by 1915 during World War I.

The ship was powered by two 3-cylinder triple-expansion steam engines, fed by steam from two Ansaldo-built water-tube boilers. The engines had 2,700 horsepower (2,000 kW) and were able to accelerate the ship to 26 knots (48 km/h; 30 mph) in her sea trials. The ship could carry a total of 60 tons of coal.

As built, the ship had two 37 mm Hotchkiss cannons, two 450 mm Schwartzkopff torpedo tubes and four torpedoes. In 1915, two 57 mm Krupp guns were added to Draç and her sister ship Kütahya. In 1919, her torpedo tubes were removed, leaving only the 37 mm guns.

== Operational history ==
Having joined the Ottoman Navy in 1907, Draç took part in training in May 1909 as part of the reforming program of Admiral Douglas Gamble, commander of the British naval mission in Istanbul. During this training, the flagships Mesudiye, Asar-ı Tevfik and Mecidiye were positioned between Büyükada and Maltepe, while Peyk-i Şevket, Berk-i Satvet, Yarhisar and her sister Samsun guarded the passages between the Princes' Islands. Draç and the torpedo boats Mosul, Kütahya, Alpagot, Hamidiye, Demirhisar and Sivrihisar sailed from Sivriada and joined the fleet, practicing torpedo attacks against larger ships. Representatives of the United Kingdom observed the exercise from the Tirimüjgan. Although the exercise was not in realistic combat conditions, it was the first naval exercise of the Ottoman Navy in twenty years.

It took part in the Balkan Wars in the Marmara Sea. At the end of the war, naval activity in the Marmara Sea was limited to Tekirdağ and Silivri between the torpedo boats, and the torpedo boats did not engage in any combat.

=== World War I ===
Draç was assigned to the Dardanelles with the 1st Torpedobot Division following the partial mobilization for the Dardanelles on 28 July 1914. Here, during July–August, she carried out patrol missions with her sister ships Mosul, Kütahya and Akhisar, occasionally reaching as far as Gökçeada. On 3 August the gunboat Durak Reis observed the Greek cruiser Georgios Averof and the battleship Spetsai on a reconnaissance mission to the area around Mosul and Draç. On 10 September a plane flying a reconnaissance flight made a forced landing because it ran out of fuel and its crew was picked up by Draç. On 19 September the torpedo boats Draç and Kütahya and the gunboats Isa Reis and Peleng-i Derya sailed along the Bosphorus, two miles off the strait, giving the gunboats the opportunity to conduct target tracking training.

On 25 April 1915, the submarine HMAS AE2 entered the Dardanelles and fired two torpedoes at the gunboat Aydin Reis. When Draç followed the submarine, the submarine escaped and ran aground on the Rumeli side of the Anatolian Mecidiyesi and was damaged. She was then sunk by Sultanhisar. On 13 May 1915, the task of sinking the battleship HMS Goliath anchored in Morto Bay was initially assigned to three torpedo boats of the Draç class; However, due to the difficulty of operating in a narrow area with three ships and the active torpedo tubes of each ship, this task was given to Muavenet-i Milliye instead. At 02.00 on 27 May 1915, Barbaros Hayreddin, Yarhisar and Draç passed in front of the periscope of the British submarine HMS E11. Due to moonlight and clear weather, the submarine was unable to attack the ships.

In July and August, many mines were laid by the Russians at the entrance to the Bosphorus and by the end of August there were more than 1,000 mines in the area. As the Russian minefields had a negative impact on maritime trade, Draç, Samsun, Kütahya, Yunus and the gunboat Malatya were assigned to minesweeping duties; however, they were not very successful in this mission. On 11 July 1915, 60 mines dropped by the Russian submarine Krab were picked up by Draç, Yunus and Kütahya and then dropped into the Dardanelles. Only a few small ships were able to cross the minefield in September. Draç patrolled the Marmara in October.

In June 1918, Draç was placed under the command of the Ministry of the Navy. On 14 July 1918, after the Yavuz Sultan Selim was laid up at Istinye, the naval fleet was reorganized while the Draç remained in active service.

=== Post-war ===
At the end of 1918 all Ottoman warships were disarmed, but torpedo boats, including Draç, were not disarmed except for their mines and torpedoes. On 26 February 1919 Vice-Admiral Somerset Arthur Gough-Calthorpe, commander of the British force, accepted the Ottoman proposal to conduct patrols against smuggling. The Ottomans assigned Hizir Reis in Izmit, Aydın Reis and the torpedo boat Preveze to the Black Sea, and Draç, Akhisar and Yunus in the Marmara Sea. The torpedo boats to operate in the Sea of Marmara were based at Heybeliada. Their mission, which was limited to preventing smuggling, was limited to patrolling the coasts of Mudanya, Bandirma, the Princes' Islands, Gallipoli and Tekirdağ. All patrol elements were under Allied inspection. Of these ships, Draç, Akhisar and Yunus; Draç, Akhisar and Yunus were decommissioned on 10 September 1920 due to their breakdowns and fuel needs and were taken to the Golden Horn.

On 29 October 1923, after the proclamation of the republic, the Ministry of the Navy issued a list of all remaining ships. In this list, Draç was listed as out of service because she was not suitable for repair. In 1926, the ship's hull was used as a work barge in Gölcük. In 1936 she was dismantled.
