= Ottoman destroyer Yarhisar =

Ottoman destroyer

History

Ottoman Empire
- Name: Yarhisar
- Ordered: 1906
- Builder: SA Chantiers et Ateliers de la Gironde, Lormont
- Laid down: 1906
- Launched: 1907
- Commissioned: 1907
- Fate: Torpedoed and sunk, 3 December 1915

General characteristics
- Class & type: Samsun-class destroyer
- Displacement: 311 t (306 long tons)
- Length: 56.3 m (184 ft 9 in) (p/p)
- Beam: 6.3 m (20 ft 8 in)
- Draft: 3.17 m (10 ft 5 in)
- Depth: 4.1 m (13 ft 5 in)
- Installed power: 2 × Normand boilers; 5,200 PS (3,800 kW)
- Propulsion: 2 × Shafts; 2 × Triple-expansion steam engines
- Speed: 28 knots (52 km/h; 32 mph)
- Range: 2,300 nmi (4,300 km; 2,600 mi) at 10 knots (19 km/h; 12 mph)
- Complement: 64 officers and enlisted men
- Armament: 1 × 65 mm (2.6 in) gun; 6 × 47 mm (1.9 in) guns; 2 × 381 mm (15 in) torpedo tubes

Yarhisar was one of the four Samsun-class destroyers, based on the Durandal class, purchased from France in 1907 by the Ottoman Navy Society. She joined the Ottoman Navy in 1907, but like the rest of the Ottoman fleet, she did not take part in any active engagement with the Italians during the Italo-Turkish War. During the Balkan Wars of 1912–1913, she took part in all major engagements such as the battles of Kaliakra, Elli and Lemnos, as well as patrol missions. During World War I, she took part in escort and interception missions, especially in the Sea of Marmara. She engaged in many battles with Allied submarines entering the Sea of Marmara. On 3 December 1915, she was torpedoed and sunk by the British submarine HMS E11 off the coast of Yalova. Seven officers and 33 enlisted men were killed in the sinking. The submarine picked up the remaining crew from the sea and delivered them to a nearby sailing ship.

== Design ==
Built at Lormont by SA Chantiers et Ateliers de la Gironde, Yarhisar was 56.3 meters (184 ft 9 in) long between the perpendiculars and 58.2 meters (190 ft 11 in) long overall, with a beam of 58.2 meters (190 ft 11 in) and a draft of 3.17 m (10 ft 5 in). The displacement of the ship was 284 t (280 long tons). Her crew consisted of 7 officers and 60 sailors when she was built in 1907.

The ship was powered by two vertical triple-expansion steam engines, fed by steam from two Normand boilers built by SA Chantiers et Ateliers de la Gironde. The engines had 5,950 indicated horsepower (4,440 kW) and could accelerate the ship to 28 knots (52 km/h; 32 mph) in 1907. Due to maintenance problems which were widespread throughout the Navy, the ship's speed dropped to 20 knots (37 km/h; 23 mph) in 1912 and 17 knots (31 km/h; 20 mph) in 1915. The ship could carry 60 tons of coal.

As built, the ship carried a single Canon de 65 mm Modèle 1891 naval gun in front of the bridge, six QF 3-pounder Hotchkiss guns (three on each side of the ship) and two single 450 mm torpedo tubes located amidships and astern.

== Construction and purchase ==
During a program to strengthen the Ottoman Navy, large quantities of cannons, ammunition and supplies were ordered from the German company Krupp in 1904. In order to maintain diplomatic and financial balance, the Ottoman government decided to place subsequent orders with France. For this purpose, four Sultanhisar-class torpedo boats were ordered from Schneider-Creusot to meet the needs of the navy. As this small order was not sufficient for the French, the 200-ton Refahiye-class gunboats and the 420-ton gunboat Marmaris were also ordered. During negotiations in 1906, the French convinced the Ottoman government to purchase four more destroyers, which were ordered on 22 January 1906. Based on the French Durandal-class destroyers, Yarhisar, Samsun and Basra were built by Ateliers de la Gironde, while Taşoz was built by Schneider et Cie.

== Operational history ==
Having joined the Ottoman Navy in 1907, Yarhisar took part in a training mission as part of the reforming program of Admiral Douglas Gamble, commander of the British naval mission in Istanbul in May 1909. During this training, the ironclads Mesudiye and Asar-ı Tevfik alongside the cruiser Mecidiye were positioned between Büyükada and Maltepe, while the torpedo cruisers Peyk-i Şevket and Berk-i Satvet, Yarhisar and her sister Samsun guarded the passages between the Princes' Islands. The torpedo boats Draç, Mosul, Kütahya, Alpagot, Hamidiye, Demirhisar and Sivrihisar sailed from Sivriada and joined the fleet, practicing torpedo attacks against larger ships. Representatives of the United Kingdom observed the exercise from the Tirimüjgan. Although the exercise was not in realistic combat conditions, it was the first naval exercise of the Ottoman Navy in twenty years. At the end of the exercise, all ships passed in front of the royal yacht Ertuğrul, which was waiting off Sarayburnu.

=== Italo-Turkish War ===
Prior to the Italo-Turkish War, Yarhisar was on a flag display and training cruise in the Mediterranean with a significant part of the fleet. The squadron, which had been maneuvering and training since July, had embarked on its annual mission to visit Beirut despite increasing political tensions. Under the command of Colonel Tahir (Burak), the fleet—consisting of two battleships, two cruisers, eight destroyers and one repair ship—left Istanbul on 6 July 1911. It sailed as far as Beirut, calling at important ports such as Midilli, Ayvalık, İzmir, Antalya, İskenderun and Latakia. When the fleet arrived at Chios Island on October 2 during its return, it met the yacht İzzettin, sent from Istanbul with news that the war had started. The commander of the fleet, who had never been informed of this, was taken by surprise and ordered his fleet back to Istanbul while placing the destroyer Basra on watch duty in the mouth of the Dardanelles. On 5 October, Yarhisar and other ships arrived in Istanbul and completed their repairs, maintenance and preparations. On 16 October 1911, Yarhisar anchored at Nara Burnu with the rest of the Ottoman fleet. She did not engage in direct combat with any Italian ships throughout the war.

=== Balkan Wars ===
On 29 October 1912, Yarhisar sailed for Varna with Mecidiye, but during the voyage she was assigned to protect the troop shipment to Midye. Yarhisar handed over her duty to Numune-i Hamiyet the next day and sailed to Varna with Mecidiye.

In early November, the Navy was tasked with supporting the Ottoman Army, which was retreating after the Battle of Lule Burgas. On 3 November, Yarhisar sailed to Silivri with Barbaros Hayreddin and Nümune-i Hamiyet. The next day she sailed alone to Tekirdağ to provide fire support for the retreating army and returned to Silivri on 7 November. The withdrawal of the army ended on 8 November.

On 21 November 1912, Yarhisar took part in the Battle of Kaliakra. An Ottoman force consisting of Hamidiye, Basra and Yarhisar was sent to Varna with the mission of preventing Bulgarian attacks on Ottoman merchant ships loaded with ammunition and, if possible, destroying Bulgarian torpedo boats; Basra broke down and was replaced by the torpedo boat Berkefşan. The ships sailed into the Black Sea at 09:00 on the morning of November 20. Berkefşan experienced some engine trouble shortly after but was repaired and joined Yarhisar and Hamidiye at 13:00. At a meeting held at 16:50 on board Hamidiye, Yarhisar was ordered to take positions 8 miles (13 km) south of Varna and Berkefşan 8 miles north of Varna, to observe the Bulgarian torpedo boats entering and leaving the harbor and to attack them if possible. After the meeting, the ships departed for Varna at 17:50 and dispersed at 20:00, heading for their duty areas. Yarhisar was in position at 21:30, followed by Berkefşan at 00:00 as Hamidiye was sailing towards Varna.

Meanwhile, four Bulgarian torpedo boats had been patrolling en masse outside Varna harbor since 22:20. At 00:40, a battle started between the Bulgarian torpedo boats and Hamidiye; she was damaged. Yarhisar, seeing the battle to the north of her, remained in her duty area until 05:30, then went to the aid of Hamidiye. Despite the damage Hamidiye received, she did not sink thanks to the successful work of her crew, but she was unable to continue her surveillance of Varna and decided to return to Istanbul. Thinking that Yarhisar and Berkefşan would be insufficient for the mission, Hamidiye called in the torpedo cruiser Berk-i Satvet to the area. Upon this message, Berk-i Satvet abandoned its mission in Constanta and immediately set off. Berkefşan and Berk-i Satvet patrolled in front of the cape until morning. At 08:00 on 21 November, when Yarhisar arrived at the rendezvous point and could not find Hamidiye and Berkefşan, the ship's commander decided to scout Varna. She made four passes within 4 miles (6.4 km) of the city and was not subjected to fire from the shore or Bulgarian torpedo boats. Due to a storm, she sailed for Istanbul at 17:00. Meanwhile, the commander of Berk-i Satvet, thinking that his mission to watch Varna was over, sailed for Constanta and sent Berkefşan to Istanbul.

Yarhisar took part in the Battle of Elli on 16 December, attached to the 2nd Destroyer Division under the command of Lieutenant Colonel Hakkı Eşref. Departing at 07:05, the division did not follow the main fleet and remained at the entrance of the Dardanelles and thus did not engage in direct combat.

On the morning of 18 January, the Ottoman fleet resumed operations. Three battleships, two cruisers and six destroyers, including Yarhisar, and support ships from the Ottoman fleet started sailing at 07:15 in the morning before this battle, which would be known as the Battle of Lemnos. The Greek force also sailed from Lemnos at 09:10. At 11:35 the battle between the forces began. Due to the hits taken by the Ottoman battleships, the fleet turned back towards Çanakkale at 12:15. The battle lasted until 14:30, with the destroyers acting as support. At 14:55 the Ottoman fleet returned to the strait and anchored at Nara at 17:40. As a result of the battle, 4 officers and 37 sailors on Barbaros Hayreddin and Turgut Reis were killed while 7 officers and 97 sailors were wounded. Yarhisar was not damaged in the battle.

On February 8, prior to the Battle of Şarköy, Yarhisar took Lieutenant Hamdi Bey to the frontline there. The next day, she was assigned to dispatch the incoming caravans to the port of Karabiga.

=== First World War ===
Yarhisar continued its active service in World War I. On 29 October 1914, during the Black Sea Raid, which led to the Ottoman Empire's entry into the war, she patrolled the Bosphorus Strait with Basra.

As of mid-February 1915, Yarhisar was placed with the Çanakkale Fortified Area Command, which was commanded by of Lieutenant Colonel Arif Bey. On 27 April 1915, the Australian submarine HMAS AE2 under the command of Lieutenant Colonel H.G. Stoker attacked the Yarhisar at Gallipoli, but when she failed to score a hit, the submarine fled to the Marmara Archipelago. On 28 May, the British submarine HMS E11 detected Draç and Yarhisar with its periscope at around 02:00, but it did not attack because of the risk of detection due to the cloudless night and bright moonlight. On 17 June, Samsun and Yarhisar spotted and chased the submarine HMS E14 near the Bosphorus, but the submarine managed to escape. On 7 August, Yarhisar, Gayret-i Vataniye and Musul departed from Istanbul. They guarded the salvage of the Peyk-i Şevket, which had been torpedoed and sunk in shallow water in Güvercinlik between Selimpaşa and Celaliye the day before by the submarines E11 and E14. Peyk-i Şevket was refloated two days later and taken to Istanbul for repairs. On the morning of 22 August, Yarhisar, escorted by the tug Dofen and four sailing barges, encountered E11 near Marmara Island. After exchanging fire with the submarine, Yarhisar turned and sailed away while the submarine sank the Dofen and a barge, taking 20 crew members prisoner. The prisoners were later transferred to an Ottoman sailing vessel. On 5 October, Yarhisar attacked the submarine HMS H1 at Mudanya, which sank three small sailboats and crippled the ship Edremit; H1 managed to escape under fire from the destroyer and nearby coastal batteries.

On 3 December 1915, E11, which had started its third and last sortie in the Sea of Marmara on 6 November, torpedoed Yarhisar while she was sailing between Tuzla and Yalova at 12:30. The torpedo hit the destroyer's aft boiler room and it subsequently exploded, splitting the ship in two and sinking it. Seven officers and 33 enlisted men from the crew of Yarhisar were killed. E11 surfaced and took the surviving Ottoman crew aboard it. The submarine rescued 3 officers, 42 enlisted men and 3 German privates, after which the crew was transferred to a passing sailboat and taken to Heybeliada.
