= Ottoman destroyer Taşoz =

Ottoman destroyer

History

Ottoman Empire
- Name: Taşoz
- Namesake: Thassos
- Ordered: 22 January 1906
- Builder: Schneider et Cie, Nantes
- Laid down: June 1906
- Launched: 1907
- Commissioned: 1907
- Decommissioned: 1932
- Fate: Scrapped, 1949

General characteristics
- Class & type: Samsun-class destroyer
- Displacement: 311 t (306 long tons)
- Length: 56.3 m (184 ft 9 in) (p/p)
- Beam: 6.3 m (20 ft 8 in)
- Draft: 3.17 m (10 ft 5 in)
- Depth: 4.1 m (13 ft 5 in)
- Installed power: 2 × Normand boilers; 5,200 PS (3,800 kW)
- Propulsion: 2 × Shafts; 2 × Triple-expansion steam engines
- Speed: 28 knots (52 km/h; 32 mph)
- Range: 2,300 nmi (4,300 km; 2,600 mi) at 10 knots (19 km/h; 12 mph)
- Complement: 64 officers and enlisted men
- Armament: 1 × 65 mm (2.6 in) gun; 6 × 47 mm (1.9 in) guns; 2 × 381 mm (15 in) torpedo tubes

Taşoz was one of the four Durandal-class destroyers purchased by the Ottoman Empire from France in 1907. The ship served in the Ottoman Navy during the Italo-Turkish War, the Balkan Wars and World War I.

== Design ==
Built at Nantes by Schneider et Cie, Taşoz was 56.3 meters (184 ft 9 in) long between the perpendiculars and 58.2 meters (190 ft 11 in) in full length, with a beam of 58.2 meters (190 ft 11 in) and a draft of 3.17 m (10 ft 5 in). The displacement of the ship was 284 t (280 long tons). Her crew consisted of 7 officers and 60 sailors when she was built in 1907.

The ship was powered by two vertical triple-expansion steam engines, fed by steam from two water-tube boilers built by SA Chantiers et Ateliers de la Gironde. The engines had 5,950 indicated horsepower (4,440 kW) and could accelerate the ship to 28 knots (52 km/h; 32 mph) in 1907. Due to maintenance problems which were widespread throughout the Navy, the ship's speed dropped to 20 knots (37 km/h; 23 mph) in 1912 and 17 knots (31 km/h; 20 mph) in 1915. The ship could carry 60 tons of coal.

As built, the ship carried one Canon de 65 mm Modèle 1891 naval gun, six QF 3-pounder Hotchkiss guns and two 450 mm torpedo tubes.

== Construction and purchase ==
At the turn of the 20th century, during a program to strengthen the Ottoman Navy, large quantities of cannons, ammunition and supplies were ordered from Krupp in 1904. In order to maintain diplomatic and financial balance, the Ottoman government decided to place subsequent orders with France. For this purpose, four Sultanhisar-class torpedo boats were ordered from Schneider-Creusot to meet the needs of the navy. As this small order was not sufficient for the French, the 200-ton Refahiye-class gunboats and the 420-ton Marmaris were also ordered. During negotiations in 1906, the French convinced the Ottoman government to purchase four more destroyers, which were ordered on 22 January 1906. Based on the French Durandal-class destroyers, Samsun, Yarhisar and Basra were built by Forges et Chantiers de la Gironde, while Taşoz was built by Schneider et Cie.

== Operational history ==
Taşoz was commissioned into the Ottoman Navy in 1907 in Istanbul. On 1 October 1911, after the outbreak of the Italo-Turkish War, Basra, together with her sister ships Samsun, Yarhisar and Basra, became part of an Ottoman fleet directed to defend the Dardanelles (consisting, in addition to them, of the battleships Barbaros Hayreddin, Turgut Reis, the ironclad Mesudiye and the torpedo boat Demirhisar), but the following day all ships returned to Istanbul to make necessary repairs and retrieve supplies. The Ottoman fleet returned to defensive positions on 12 October, with little activity until the end of the conflict.

During the First Balkan War, on 12 December 1912 Taşoz and Basra went on patrol in the waters of the Dardanelles, intending to ambush Greek destroyers, but had to return due to trouble with their boilers. Between 7 and 11 February 1913, Taşoz and Basra, together with the ironclad Asar-i Tevfik took part in the unsuccessful descent at Podima on the Black Sea coast, losing Asar-i Tevfik in this action. In April and May, the Taşoz, together with the torpedo boat Berkefşan, escorted the transport ship Kizilirmak, sailing from Constanța to Istanbul.

At the outbreak of World War I, the destroyer was already obsolete and of low combat value. On 14–16 August 1914, Taşoz together with the cruiser Berk-i Satvet patrolled the Turkish Straits. On 21 September, Taşoz and Basra escorted the battlecruiser Yavuz Sultan Selim during a patrol cruise in the Black Sea. On the morning of 29 October, the Taşoz, together with her sister Samsun and the line cruiser Yavuz Sultan Selim, took part in an attack on the Russian harbour of Sevastopol, which was carried out without a formal declaration of war. After the attack, both destroyers participated in the rescue of sailors from the scuttled Russian minesweeper Prut, taking on board a total of 75 survivors.

In 1915, her depleted engine room reduced her top speed to 17 knots, and the crew size increased to 91 men (17 Germans and 74 Turks). On 1 April 1915, a group of Ottoman ships, consisting of the cruisers Mecidiye and Hamidiye, and the destroyers Taşoz, Samsun, Muâvenet-i Milliye and Yâdigâr-ı Millet left the Bosporus, with the task of attacking Odessa. The long-range cover team for this operation consisted of the cruisers Yavuz Sultan Selim and Midilli, patrolling the waters west of the Crimean Peninsula. On the night of 2/3 April, the team arrived at Odessa and the destroyers started trawling. On 3 April, at 4 a.m. Taşoz and Samsun were damaged, and at 6:40, 16 nautical miles from the Vorontsov Lighthouse, the cruiser Mecidiye struck a mine, suffering such heavy damage, that after taking out its crew and destroying its armament and radio station, it was scuttled by a torpedo fired by Yâdigâr-ı Millet. The operation was aborted and the ships returned to base on 4 April.

Prior to the attack by Entente forces on Gallipoli Taşoz, together with her sister ships, escorted transports of Ottoman troops organised to reinforce the forces defending the Dardanelles. On 3 August 1915, the cruiser Hamidiye and the destroyers Taşoz, Muâvenet-i Milliye and Numûne-i Hamiyet escorted a convoy consisting of the ships Zonguldak, Eresos, Illiria and Seyhun to the port of Zonguldak.

On 28 October 1916, Taşoz transported a group of German officers to Constanta to supervise the establishment of a naval base for Central Power ships there.

On 22 January 1918, Taşoz and Numûne-i Hamiyet and the torpedo boat Akhisar were based in Çanakkale, tasked with protecting the damaged battlecruiser Yavuz Sultan Selim from attack by enemy submarines. On 30 March, Taşoz, Samsun and Basra escorted the German transport ship Patmos, carrying soldiers from Constanta to Odessa. In October, the ship was put in reserve in Istanbul.

After the end of the war, on 29 October 1923, Taşoz was incorporated into the newly formed Turkish Navy Between 1924 and 1925, the vessel underwent an overhaul at Deniz Fabrikaları in Istanbul and after its completion, entered active service. The ship was withdrawn from the fleet in 1932, following the purchase of newer Italian destroyers. The destroyer was scrapped only in 1949 at Gölcük.
