= Turquoise (disambiguation) =

Turquoise is a gemstone.

Turquoise may also refer to:

== Arts ==
- Turquoise (Devon Allman album), 2013
- Turquoise (Electric Six album), 2023
- Turquoise (Dr. Stone), a character in the manga series Dr. Stone
- Turquoise (film), 2009
- The Turquoise (novel), a 1946 novel by Anya Seton
- "Turquoise" (song), a 1965 song by Donovan

== Other uses ==
- Turquoise (color)
- Turquoise (horse), a British Thoroughbred racehorse
- Turquoise (trading platform), a European equities trading platform
- Turquoise ribbon
- French ship Turquoise, several ships
- Turquoise Trail, a National Scenic Byway in the United States

== See also ==
- Turquoise Coast (disambiguation)
