= Ottoman destroyer Samsun =

Ottoman destroyer

History

Ottoman Empire
- Name: Samsun
- Namesake: Samsun
- Ordered: 22 January 1906
- Builder: SA Chantiers et Ateliers de la Gironde, Lormont
- Laid down: 1906
- Launched: 1907
- Commissioned: 3 September 1907
- Decommissioned: 1932
- Fate: Scrapped, 1949

General characteristics
- Class & type: Samsun-class destroyer
- Displacement: 311 t (306 long tons)
- Length: 56.3 m (184 ft 9 in) (p/p)
- Beam: 6.3 m (20 ft 8 in)
- Draft: 3.17 m (10 ft 5 in)
- Depth: 4.1 m (13 ft 5 in)
- Installed power: 2 × Normand boilers; 5,950 ihp (4,440 kW)
- Propulsion: 2 × Shafts; 2 × Triple-expansion steam engines
- Speed: 28 knots (52 km/h; 32 mph)
- Range: 2,300 nmi (4,300 km; 2,600 mi) at 10 knots (19 km/h; 12 mph)
- Complement: 64 officers and enlisted men
- Armament: 1 × 65 mm (2.6 in) gun; 6 × 47 mm (1.9 in) guns; 2 × 381 mm (15 in) torpedo tubes

Samsun was one of the four Durandal-class destroyers purchased by the Ottoman Empire from France in 1907. The ship served in the Ottoman Navy during the Italo-Turkish War, the Balkan Wars and World War I.

During the Italo-Turkish war, she did not take part in any active engagement with the Italians like the rest of the Ottoman Navy. In October 1914, she participated in the Black Sea Raid that led to the Ottoman Empire's entry into World War I. Throughout the war, she took part in many missions including patrols, escorting convoys against Allied submarines in the Sea of Marmara, escorting the fleet's battleships, and minesweeping at the entrance of the Bosphorus. In 1918, she inspected the interned Imperial Russian Navy. The destroyer, which served in the navy during the Republican period, was decommissioned in 1932 and scrapped in 1949.

== Design ==
Built at Lormont by SA Chantiers et Ateliers de la Gironde, Samsun was 56.3 meters (184 ft 9 in) long between the perpendiculars and 58.2 meters (190 ft 11 in) in long overall, with a beam of 58.2 meters (190 ft 11 in) and a draft of 3.17 m (10 ft 5 in). The displacement of the ship was 284 t (280 long tons). Her crew consisted of 7 officers and 60 sailors when she was built in 1907.

The ship was powered by two vertical triple-expansion steam engines, fed by steam from two Normand boilers built by SA Chantiers et Ateliers de la Gironde. The engines produced 5,950 indicated horsepower (4,440 kW) and could accelerate the ship to 28 knots (52 km/h; 32 mph) in 1907. Due to maintenance problems which were widespread throughout the Navy, the ship's speed dropped to 20 knots (37 km/h; 23 mph) in 1912 and 17 knots (31 km/h; 20 mph) in 1915. The ship could carry 60 tons of coal.

As built, the ship carried a single Canon de 65 mm Modèle 1891 naval gun in front of the bridge, six QF 3-pounder Hotchkiss guns (three on each side of the ship) and two single 450 mm torpedo tubes located amidships and astern.

== Construction and purchase ==
During a program to strengthen the Ottoman Navy, large quantities of cannons, ammunition and supplies were ordered from Krupp in 1904. In order to maintain diplomatic and financial balance, the Ottoman government decided to place subsequent orders with France. For this purpose, four Sultanhisar-class torpedo boats were ordered from Schneider-Creusot to meet the needs of the navy. As this small order was not sufficient for the French, the 200-ton Refahiye-class gunboats and the 420-ton gunboat Marmaris were also ordered. During negotiations in 1906, the French convinced the Ottoman government to purchase four more destroyers, which were ordered on 22 January 1906. Based on the French Durandal-class destroyers, Samsun, Yarhisar and Basra were built by Ateliers de la Gironde, while Taşoz was built by Schneider et Cie.

== Operational history ==
Having joined the Ottoman Navy in 1907, Samsun took part in a training mission as part of the reforming program of Admiral Douglas Gamble, commander of the British naval mission in Istanbul in May 1909. During this training, the ironclads Mesudiye and Asar-ı Tevfik alongside the cruiser Mecidiye were positioned between Büyükada and Maltepe, while the torpedo cruisers Peyk-i Şevket and Berk-i Satvet, Samsun and her sister Yarhisar guarded the passages between the Princes' Islands. The torpedo boats Draç, Mosul, Kütahya, Alpagot, Hamidiye, Demirhisar and Sivrihisar sailed from Sivriada and joined the fleet, practicing torpedo attacks against larger ships. Representatives of the United Kingdom observed the exercise from the destroyer tender Tirimüjgan. Although the exercise was not in realistic combat conditions, it was the first naval exercise of the Ottoman Navy in twenty years. At the end of the exercise, all ships passed in front of the royal yacht Ertuğrul, which was waiting off Sarayburnu.

=== Italo-Turkish War and Balkan Wars ===
At the beginning of the Italo-Turkish War, on 1 October 1911, Samsun was anchored at Cape Nara with the rest of the Ottoman fleet. The fleet, which had been maneuvering and training since July, had completed its annual visit to Beirut despite increasing political tensions. On 2 October, the fleet returned to Istanbul for repairs and maintenance. It did not engage in direct combat with any Italian ships throughout the war.

Samsun took part in the Battle of Elli on 16 December 1912. As part of the 2nd Destroyer Division, she, along with the torpedo boat Akhisar, served as a screen, scout and reconnaissance in front of the battleships, but due to the lack of radio equipment, she communicated with the main fleet through the Tirimüjgan using a semaphore. Another task of the two ships was to keep the Greek submarine Delfin away from the battleships. Samsun did not engage in the main battle. Later, the ship was assigned to protect the landing ships with the 2nd Destroyer Division in the Bozcaada landing planned for January 1913, but this operation was later canceled. On 10 January, the 2nd Destroyer Division, along with the main fleet, observed the Greek ships on patrol and pursued them; after shelling from the battleships, the fleet returned to Çanakkale.

=== World War I ===
The routes of the ships involved in the Black Sea raid

Samsun served in various missions during World War I. She also took part in the Black Sea raid, which caused the Ottoman Empire to enter the war. Samsun, her sister Taşoz and the battlecruiser Yavuz Sultan Selim were to go to Sevastopol. Yavuz Sultan Selim, Samsun and Taşoz first went to Amasra, where the destroyers took coal from Yavuz Sultan Selim. At 05:00 on 29 October, seven miles from Sevastopol, the destroyers began minesweeping, while Yavuz sailed behind the destroyers. Just before 06:30, Yavuz bombarded the harbor of Sevastopol for 15 minutes. However, the Russians were prepared because of a radio message from Odessa at 04:00 hours, announcing the raid by Turkish ships. During this time, Yavuz was exchanging fire with the pre-dreadnought Georgii Pobedonosets and shore batteries. Yavuz came within eight kilometers of the shore batteries and shelled them during her evasive maneuvers. Fifteen minutes after the start of the battle, at 06:45, she ceased firing and sailed away. When Yavuz Sultan Selim turned towards the area upon seeing smoke in the southeast direction, she encountered three Russian destroyers and opened fire from a distance of 12 km; the destroyers continued to pursue the Turkish ships, but the Russian attack ended after the lead destroyer was heavily damaged by Yavuz Sultan Selim's secondary batteries. Meanwhile, the Russian minelayer Prut, loaded with 700 mines and sailing to Sevastopol, was encountered by Yavuz, which sank the ship with her 15 cm guns. 75 men (72 enlisted and three officers) of the crew of the Prut were rescued by Samsun and Taşoz. Since the arrival of the Prut was expected, the defensive minefield around the harbor was deactivated. When it was activated 20 minutes later, the Ottoman ships had already left. According to one of the captured Russian officers from the Prut, the task of the Russian ships was to lay mines in front of the mouth of the Bosphorus at night in order to destroy the Ottoman fleet leaving the Bosphorus. After the battle, the ships returned to Istanbul.

On 28 March 1915, six seaplanes from the Russian fleet, which had come within 25 miles of the Bosphorus, bombed Anadolufeneri and Rumelifeneri and the coastal fortifications and batteries in the area. The following day, another Russian force struck transport ships in Zonguldak and Ereğli. In response, the Ottoman ships put to sea on 1 April. At 06.30 on 3 April 15 miles off Odessa, Mecidiye struck a mine and sank. After this loss, the fleet turned back; Samsun and Taşoz were on course for an intercepting mission in case the Russians came to the area, but for technical reasons they could not maintain their speed and turned back to Istanbul.

Samsun also performed convoy escort and anti-submarine duties throughout the war. On 2 June 1915, while escorting two steamers, Tecilli and Başlangıç, the convoy was attacked by the submarine HMS E11 off the coast of Tekirdağ. Waiting for Samsun to move about 10 miles away from the transports, the submarine launched a torpedo which hit Tecilli; the ship sank with 18 crew members. E11 also attacked Başlangıç but its torpedo missed. Despite this, the crew of the Başlangıç abandoned it. After artillery fire from the shore, E11 moved away from the area. On 17 June, Samsun and Yarhisar spotted and attacked the submarine HMS E14 near the Bosphorus, but she managed to escape by diving. On 4 August, E14 once again encountered Samsun near Tekirdağ, escorting the ships Tenedos and Bandirma. (Note: Langensiepen & Guleryuz have the Bandirma built in 1879 and weighing 474 gt (p.39); the Bandırma in which Atatürk traveled in was built in 1878 and weighed 279 tons (p.57), thus they are seemingly different ships.) The torpedo launched by the submarine passed under the Tenedos and missed.

The French submarine Turquoise had entered the Marmara Sea by secretly passing through the Dardanelles on 20 October. Due to malfunctions, the submarine was detected trying to exit on 30 October and was damaged by shore batteries; it was abandoned by its crew, running aground in water 4 m (13 ft) deep. On 2 November, the submarine was easily refloated and on 3 November, it was decided to be towed to Istanbul by the minelayer Nusret. Aydın Reis from Çanakkale, Nusret and the submarine met Samsun off Marmara Island at 18:00. Under the leadership of Samsun, the ships, which were on blackout against Allied submarines, collided en route. Samsun, whose bow was damaged, was towed by the tug Paris in the last part of its voyage and returned to Marmara Island. Nusret, which was slightly damaged, reached the island with its own engine while the French submarine, which survived the tow rope, was taken to the island by starting its engines. The submarine was then towed to Istanbul by the destroyer Gayret-i Vataniye and on 11 November, it was incorporated into the Ottoman Navy and renamed Müstecip Onbaşı, after the naval artilleryman who had damaged the submarine. In July 1916, she was tasked with clearing the Russian mines laid at the entrance to the Bosphorus. Mounted with minesweeping equipment brought from Germany, the ship, together with the Antalya and Demirhisar-class ships, managed to clear a channel to enter the Bosphorus after weeks of effort. Samsun, together with her sister Basra, took part in the Battle of Imbros, which took place on 20 January 1918. The ships that participated in the battle were the battlecruiser Yavuz Sultan Selim, the cruiser Midilli, the destroyers Muâvenet-i Milliye, Numûne-i Hamiyet, Samsun and her sister Basra. The destroyers sailed to Çanakkale in secrecy after replenishing coal in Zonguldak. The Çanakkale Fortified Position Command gathered intelligence through reconnaissance flights over Imbros and Limni, and the fighter planes requested from the German station in Xanthi were assigned the task of protecting Yavuz Sultan Selim and Midilli, and surveilling the Bulgarian coast. On 19 January 1918, the operational order was issued for Yavuz Sultan Selim to target large enemy ships, Midilli to target light ships and the airbase at Imbros, and destroyers, including Samsun, to provide security against submarines in front of the Bosphorus. Midilli and Yavuz Sultan Selim struck mines during the operation; Midilli sank while the damaged Yavuz Sultan Selim ran aground at Cape Nara. During the week-long rescue operations, Samsun, together with some gunboats, provided security against submarines.

Russia withdrew from the war in December 1917 and an armistice was declared. Samsun performed escort duties in the Black Sea in 1918. On 1 March, the ships Samsun and Hamidiye, Numune-i Hamiyet and Muavenet-i Milliye escorted the Akdeniz carrying 300 infantry to Trabzon, which the Russians had returned. On 30 March, Samsun, Basra and Taşoz and the ship Patmos went to Odessa to observe the armistice with the Russian Navy. On 28 June, Yavuz Sultan Selim, Samsun, Numune-i Hamiyet and Muavenet-i Milliye, which went to check the Russian Navy intercepted in Novorossiysk, arrived at the port and saw that the Russians had scuttled their own ships. While Samsun and other destroyers remained in the area, Yavuz Sultan Selim returned to Istanbul. After the Armistice of Mudros signed on 30 October 1918, she was interned.

=== Republican period ===
Samsun was out of service during the proclamation of the republic. She was recommissioned into the Turkish Navy in 1924 and was removed from the navy inventory in 1932. In 1949 she was scrapped at Gölcük.
