= Ottoman destroyer Gayret-i Vataniye =

Ottoman destroyer

History

Ottoman Empire
- Name: Gayret-i Vatâniye
- Builder: Schichau-Werke, Germany
- Laid down: 1908
- Launched: 30 September 1909
- Acquired: March 1910
- Commissioned: 17 August 1910
- Fate: Ran aground, 30 October 1916

General characteristics
- Class & type: Muâvenet-i Millîye-class destroyer
- Displacement: Design: 665 t (654 long tons; 733 short tons); Full load: 765 t (753 long tons; 843 short tons)
- Length: 74.2 m (243 ft 5 in) loa
- Beam: 7.9 m (25 ft 11 in)
- Draft: 3.04 m (10 ft)
- Installed power: 4 × water-tube boilers; 17,500 metric horsepower (17,300 shp)
- Propulsion: 2 × steam turbines; 2 × screw propellers
- Speed: 32 knots (59 km/h; 37 mph)
- Range: 975 nmi (1,806 km; 1,122 mi) at 17 knots (31 km/h; 20 mph)
- Crew: 3 officers; 81 enlisted men
- Armament: 2 × 75 mm (3 in) guns; 2 × 57 mm (2.2 in) guns; 3 × 45 cm (17.7 in) torpedo tubes

Gayret-i Vataniye originally built as SMS S168, was one of the four S138-class torpedo boats built for the German Imperial Navy, but was purchased for the Ottoman Navy during construction. (Note: The German Navy classified ships of this type as torpedo boats, but the Ottoman Navy used the classification "muhrip" (destroyer).)

== Design ==
Gayret-i Vataniye was 74 meters (242 ft 9 in) long at the waterline and 74.2 m (243 ft 5 in) long overall. She had beam (nautical) of 7.9 m (25 ft 11 in) and a draft of 3.04 m (10 ft) forward. The ship had a displacement of 665 t (654 long tons; 733 short tons) as designed and 765 t (753 long tons; 843 short tons) at full load. She had a crew of three officers and eighty-one enlisted men. The ship received two sets of steam turbines, each driving a screw propeller. Steam was provided by four water-tube boilers, three of which burned coal, and the fourth which burned fuel oil. Her propulsion system was rated to produce 17,500 metric horsepower (17,300 shp) for a top speed of 32 knots (59 km/h; 37 mph). She had a cruising radius of 975 nautical miles (1,806 km; 1,122 mi) at a more economical speed of 17 knots (31 km/h; 20 mph).

Gayret-i Vataniye initially carried a gun armament of two 8.8 cm (3.5 in) SK L/30 guns, along with three 5.2 cm (2 in) SK L/55 guns, all of which were placed in single pivot mounts. The ship's primary offensive armament consisted of three 45 cm (17.7 in) torpedo tubes mounted on the deck individually.

=== Modifications ===
After arriving in the Ottoman Empire, the ship received a new gun armament that consisted of a pair of 75 mm (3 in) guns and two 57 mm (2.2 in) guns. Poor maintenance by her crew reduced the efficiency of her propulsion system, and by 1912, the ship was capable of steaming no more than 26 knots (48 km/h; 30 mph). During World War I, the ship's complement increased to a total of 112, of whom 23 were Germans.

== Service history ==
The keel for the new vessel was laid down in 1908, originally under the name S168, at the Schichau-Werke in Elbing, Germany. The ship was launched on 30 September 1909, and during fitting out, she was sold to the Ottoman Navy and renamed Gayret-i Vataniye, which means "national endeavor". The purchase of the vessel, along with three of her sister ships—Muavenet-i Milliye, Yadigar-i Millet, and Nümune-i Hamiyet—occurred in March 1910, at the same time that the Ottoman government acquired a pair of pre-dreadnought battleships. These were Kurfürst Friedrich Wilhelm and Weissenburg, which were renamed Barbaros Hayreddin and Turgut Reis, respectively when they were transferred on 1 September 1910. The destroyers had already been commissioned into the Ottoman fleet on 17 August. The six ships sailed together from Germany to the Ottoman Empire.

At the start of the Italo-Turkish War in September 1911, she was assigned to the main destroyer flotilla, along with her three sisters and the four Samsun-class destroyers. At the start of the war, the Ottoman training fleet, which consisted of the battleship division, the cruiser division, and the destroyer flotilla, was at sea, unaware of the onset of hostilities. On 1 October, an Ottoman steamer informed the fleet that war had begun two days earlier, so the fleet steamed at high speed to the Dardanelles, where it sought refuge behind the coastal fortifications guarding the straits. The fleet briefly went to sea on 4 October but returned to port without engaging any Italian vessels. The fleet saw little activity for the rest of the war, and made no attempt to attack the significantly larger Italian fleet. The naval command expected a war between the Ottoman Empire and the Balkan League and viewed that conflict as a greater threat to the country. They decided to preserve the fleet and prepare it for war, though no repairs were actually carried out.

=== First Balkan War ===
Map depicting the maneuvers of the Ottoman (red) and Greek (blue) fleets during the Battle of Elli

By the time of the First Balkan War in late 1912 and early 1913, the Ottoman fleet had been reorganized geographically, and Gayret-i Vataniye was placed in the Bosporus Fleet, along with most of the other modern units of the Ottoman Navy. In the first two months of the war, the Ottoman fleet concentrated its efforts against Bulgarian forces along the Black Sea coast, but Gayret-i Vataniye was not actively involved in the fighting.

By December, the fleet had been reorganized; Gayret-i Vataniye was assigned to II Division, along with Mecidiye, Nümune-i Hamiyet, and Yarhisar. By that time, the fleet's attention had turned to the Greek fleet operating against the Ottoman coast in the Aegean Sea. The ships of II Division took part in the Battle of Elli on 16 December; they were given the task of screening the Battleship Division on their port flank. In the ensuing action, Georgios Averof crossed in front of the Ottoman fleet and engaged from one side while the three Hydra-class ironclads attacked from the other. This prompted the Ottomans to withdraw to the Dardanelles. Gayret-i Vataniye and the rest of II Division were relieved by the ironclads Mesudiye and Asar-i Tevfik as they approached the straits. Six days later, Mecidiye sortied with I and II Divisions in an attempt to trap and sink a group of Greek destroyers patrolling off the coast of Anatolia; Mecidiye and I Division were to outflank them and drive the destroyers toward Gayret-i Vataniye and the rest of II Division, but the Greeks quickly fled after a brief engagement with Mecidiye. The Ottoman destroyers were then sent to patrol off the coast of Tenedos, but they met no Greek vessels there.

The Ottoman Army had become convinced that it could occupy Tenedos and that the fleet could support an amphibious assault on the island, over repeated objections from the naval command. The Ottoman government nevertheless ordered the operation, and on 4 January 1913, the navy decided to make a major sweep toward the island, despite the fact that the regiment assigned to the landing had not yet arrived. Gayret-i Vataniye and the other II Division ships were among the first vessels to leave the Dardanelles, and they took up a defensive position by around 07:15 near the straits while the other elements of the fleet assembled themselves. During this process, a Greek squadron appeared near Imbros, which prompted the Ottoman destroyers to seek the protection of Mecidiye at about 07:30. Both sides engaged in a brief exchange of gunfire, but neither attempted to close the range. By 10:00, the Ottoman battleships had joined the fleet outside the Dardanelles, and II Division took up a screening position to starboard. An hour and a half later, the fleet had sailed far enough that the Greeks were in a position to block their route to the Dardanelles, so the Ottomans cancelled the operation. At 11:50, they briefly engaged the Greek fleet, which was also retreating, and after forty minutes of firing, neither side had scored a hit. The Ottomans thereafter returned to the Dardanelles.

After a series of inconclusive engagements between Ottoman cruisers and Greek destroyers in early January, the Ottoman naval command decided to make a major attack on Imbros in an attempt to lure out Greek warships. The bulk of the fleet sortied on the morning of 10 January; II Division, less Nümune-i Hamiyet, once again screened the fleet during its approach. The cruisers Mecidiye and Hamidiye attempted to chase a pair of Greek destroyers, which turned and fled; II Division was sent forward to support the cruisers but no further action took place. Reports of the Greek fleet in the area prompted the Ottoman commander to order the cruisers and destroyers to rejoin the battleships and then return to the Dardanelles. After the fleet resumed its cruising formation around mid-day, the battleships briefly engaged three Greek destroyers at long range, which quickly retreated. The Ottomans thereafter entered the Dardanelles.

In mid-February, the Ottomans learned that Bulgaria was assembling a convoy of merchant vessels in Italy to bring supplies to the country. The cruiser Hamidiye, which had been at sea on a commerce raiding operation, was ordered to intercept the ships before they reached Bulgaria. To support the cruiser, a task force of destroyers, including Gayret-i Vataniye, and the cruiser Mecidiye was sent into the Aegean to attack any Greek vessels that might try to interfere with Hamidiye's operations. The ships sortied on 22 February and sailed toward Imbros, and they encountered a pair of Greek destroyers in a light fog, but neither side decided to press the attack and the Ottomans turned back to the Dardanelles. On 3 March, Gayret-i Vataniye, Muavenet-i Milliye, and Yarhisar sortied to support a sweep by the destroyers Sultanhisar and Demirhisar; the latter pair hoped to catch the Greek submarine Delfin, which was believed to be in the area. The approach of a Greek squadron from Imbros prompted the Ottomans to break off the operation.

In early April, reports of a Greek cruiser and four destroyers blockading the Gulf of İzmir prompted the Ottoman Navy to dispatch Mecidiye, Gayret-i Vataniye, Nümune-i Hamiyet, and Muavenet-i Milliye to investigate on 8 April. Gayret-i Vataniye was detached to scout the Gulf of Saros and she spotted three Greek destroyers in the distance, but the range was too great to engage them and she rejoined the rest of the flotilla instead. The Ottomans then returned to port. Three days later, Gayret-i Vataniye and Yadigar-i Millet sortied and encountered a pair of Greek destroyers off Tenedos. The Ottoman naval command ordered them to shadow the Greeks while the rest of the fleet got underway. By that time, another pair of destroyers had reinforced the Greek ships, and after the Ottoman fleet arrived, they attacked the Ottoman ships at long range. Neither side closed the range before the Ottomans turned back to the Dardanelles and the Greeks made for Imbros.

=== World War I ===
After the start of World War I in July 1914, the Ottoman Empire officially remained neutral, but the government signed a secret treaty with Germany to eventually enter the war against the Triple Entente. In mid-August, Gayret-i Vataniye and Nümune-i Hamiyet were sent to İzmit to join the flotilla stationed there, as the Ottomans set about strengthening the defenses of the Bosporus and the Dardanelles. When the Ottoman Empire entered World War I in late October 1914, Gayret-i Vataniye was assigned to I Destroyer Squadron with her three sisters.

Gayret-i Vataniye took part in the Black Sea raid by the ex-German battlecruiser Yavuz Sultan Selim. Gayret-i Vataniye and Muavenet-i Millet were detached to Odessa on 29 October, where they encountered a Russian convoy escorted by the gunboats Donets and Kuranets. Gayret-i Vataniye torpedoed and sank Donets while Muavenet-i Millet opened fire on Kuranets, rammed and sank a motorboat, and then shelled a merchant ship in harbor and the oil tank terminal. Russian coastal artillery prompted the Ottomans to withdraw, after which they rejoined Yavuz Sultan Selim and the rest of the Ottoman squadron. Two weeks later, on 14 November, Yavuz Sultan Selim was sent to attack the Russian fleet off the Crimea, and Gayret-i Vataniye, Muavenet-i Millet, the destroyer Samsun, the torpedo cruiser Peyk-i Şevket, and Hamidiye sortie the next day to support the battlecruiser. None of the cruisers or destroyers take part in the inconclusive Battle of Cape Sarych on 18 November, and the Ottomans return to port.

By July 1915, the Ottoman naval command had resumed convoy operations for colliers transporting coal from Zonguldak. On 3 July, Gayret-i Vataniye and Nümune-i Hamiyet escorted a pair of ships, SS Seyhun and SS Eresos, carrying coal from Constantinople. The next morning, a group of Russian destroyers attacked, but the Ottomans drove them off and successfully brought the ships to Zonguldak. Later convoys experience significant losses, and several Russian successes against the collier convoys largely eliminate large-scale coal transportation by the end of 1915, which severely curtails operations by the Ottoman Navy due to lack of fuel. On 1 April 1916, Gayret-i Vataniye met the collier SS Dubrovnik off Şile, and shortly thereafter the Russian submarine Tyulen torpedoed Dubrovnik, badly damaging her. Gayret-i Vataniye picked up her crew, and the ship drifted ashore, where she was later destroyed by the Russian submarine Morzh.

On 6 August, Peyk-i Şevket was torpedoed and sunk by the British submarine HMS E11. Since the cruiser sank in shallow water, the Ottomans decided to refloat the vessel, and Gayret-i Vataniye and the destroyers Yarhisar and Musul were sent to guard the wreck while salvage operations took place. On 8 August, Peyk-i Şevket was raised and taken to Constantinople for repairs. The French submarine Turquoise, which had concluded a patrol in the Sea of Marmara, was captured by Ottoman forces as she attempted to pass through the Dardanelles on 30 October. After a collision between the vessel towing Turquoise and another ship, Gayret-i Vataniye was sent to take over the tow back to Constantinople, which they reached the following day.

On 30 October 1916, Admiral Wilhelm Souchon sailed aboard Muavenet-i Millet in company with Nümune-i Hamiyet to Varna, to meet with Field Marshal August von Mackensen, who was leading German Army operations in Romania. Gayret-i Vataniye was also sent to act as a dispatch boat to relay messages between Varna, Bulgaria, and Constanța, Romania. While en route from Constantinople that day, Gayret-i Vataniye ran aground on an uncharted reef off Varna, and could not be freed. Her crew removed useful equipment and then blew up the wreck.
