= Turquoise Coast =

Turquoise Coast may refer to:

- Turkish Riviera, Turkiye
- Turquoise Coast (Western Australia), Australia
  - Turquoise Coast Trail, Jurien Bay, Western Australia, Australia

== See also ==
- Coral reef
- Turquoise (disambiguation)
- Coast (disambiguation)
