= Russian minelayer Prut =

Russian minelayer that served in World War I

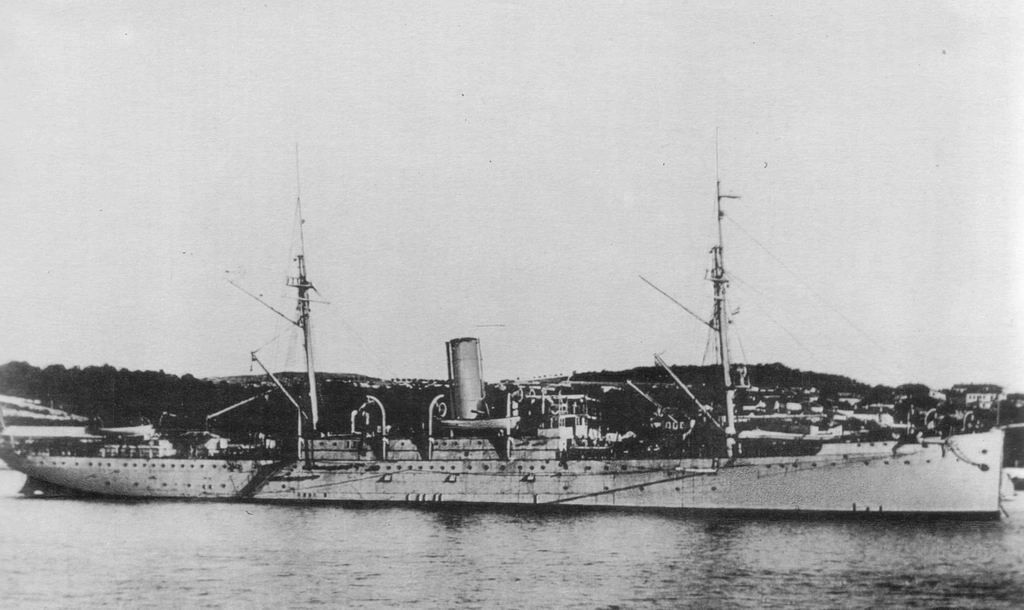
- Prut

Russian Empire
- Name: Prut
- Namesake: Prut
- Launched: 3 November 1879
- Commissioned: 24 June 1895
- Fate: Scuttled, 29 October 1914

General characteristics
- Type: Minelayer
- Displacement: 5,459 tons
- Length: 109.7 m (359 ft 11 in)
- Beam: 13.1 m (43 ft 0 in)
- Draft: 7.9 m (25 ft 11 in)
- Propulsion: 1 steam engine, 2 boilers, 2,628 hp (1,960 kW)
- Speed: 13.5 knots (25 km/h; 16 mph)
- Range: 4,370 nmi (8,090 km; 5,030 mi)
- Complement: 68 (6 officers)
- Armament: 8 x 47 mm guns; 2 x 37 mm guns; 3 machine guns; 900 mines

Prut, formerly Kinfauns Castle, was a minelayer acquired by the Imperial Russian Navy, a former postal and passenger steamer of the Dobroflot and a training vessel.

== Construction ==
The steamer Kinfauns Castle was built in 1879 by John Elder & Co. on behalf of shipowner D. Currie. On 21 February 1884 she was acquired by the Dobroflot and entered service as the Moskva. On 19 June 1895, she had been recognized as not complying with commercial requirements of the Dobroflot and sold to the Naval Ministry of the Russian Empire for the sum of 380,000 rubles.

On 24 June 1895, she was enlisted into the Black Sea Fleet under the name of Prut as a training vessel. In 1909 she was converted to a minelayer and transferred to a new class on 19 November 1909.

== Service history ==
During the 1905 Russian Revolution, a mutiny broke out on the Prut led by the Bolshevik sailor A. I. Petrov. She went to Odessa to join the battleship Potemkin, which had also mutinied, but she was not found there. Under a red flag the ship headed for Sevastopol to try to raise a rebellion on the other ships of the squadron. The ship was met by two destroyers and escorted to base, where 42 crew members were arrested. After the suppression of the uprising the Prut was used for some time as a prison ship in Sevastopol.

=== First World War ===
On 28 October 1914, Prut was sent from Sevastopol to Yalta to transfer an infantry battalion there to Sevastopol, but around midnight, before reaching Yalta, it was ordered to return and to prepare to lay mines around the area.

On the next day, 29 October, the Prut and three destroyers under the command of Captain 1st Rank Prince Vladimir Trubetskoy (which had the task of supporting the Prut in case of an enemy encounter) met the Ottoman (ex-German) battlecruiser Goeben near Sevastopol.

The destroyers tried to cover Prut and make a torpedo attack, but were repulsed by the fire of Goeben's secondary batteries; the lead destroyer Leitenant Pushchin (the former Zadorniy) was heavily damaged by three direct hits of 150 mm shells, but managed to reach Sevastopol (with the loss of only 5 dead, 2 missing and 12 wounded). Goeben then shelled the Prut and set it on fire. Unable to flee from the superior enemy, her commander, Captain 2nd Rank Georgy Bykov ordered to prepare the ship for scuttling; the crew opened her watertight compartments and began to board her lifeboats. Goeben and one of her escort destroyers fired at the sinking minelayer for some time.

When the ship began to sink, the ship's priest Hieromonk Anthony (Smirnov) gave up his place on the lifeboat and from the sinking ship blessed the sailors sailing away; he died with the ship, and was posthumously awarded the Order of Saint George 4th Class for this action.

At 08:40, the Prut disappeared under the water. Of her crew, 30 men perished, the majority (about 145 men) escaped on lifeboats; the Ottoman destroyers Samsun and Taşoz rescued and took 75 men prisoner, including the ship's commander, and handed them over to the Goeben.

== Bibliography ==
- Sevengül, Hüsamettin (1976). Birinci Dünya Harbinde Türk Harbi - Deniz Harekatı (PDF). Genelkurmay Harp Tarihi Başkanlığı.
- Kozlov, D.Y. (2009). «Strannaya voyna» v Chernom more (avgust — oktyabr' 1914 goda). Moscow: Kvadriga Publishing. ISBN 978-5-904162-07-8.
