= Ottoman destroyer Nümune-i Hamiyet =

Ottoman destroyer

History

Ottoman Empire
- Name: Nümune-i Hamiyet
- Builder: Schichau-Werke, Germany
- Laid down: 1908
- Launched: 3 July 1909
- Acquired: March 1910
- Commissioned: 17 August 1910
- Decommissioned: October 1918
- Fate: Broken up, 1953

General characteristics
- Class & type: Muâvenet-i Millîye-class destroyer
- Displacement: Design: 665 t (654 long tons; 733 short tons); Full load: 765 t (753 long tons; 843 short tons)
- Length: 74.2 m (243 ft 5 in) loa
- Beam: 7.9 m (25 ft 11 in)
- Draft: 3.04 m (10 ft)
- Installed power: 4 × water-tube boilers; 17,500 metric horsepower (17,300 shp)
- Propulsion: 2 × steam turbines; 2 × screw propellers
- Speed: 32 knots (59 km/h; 37 mph)
- Range: 975 nmi (1,806 km; 1,122 mi) at 17 knots (31 km/h; 20 mph)
- Crew: 3 officers; 81 enlisted men
- Armament: 2 × 75 mm (3 in) guns; 2 × 57 mm (2.2 in) guns; 3 × 45 cm (17.7 in) torpedo tubes

Nümune-i Hamiyet, originally built as SMS S167, was one of the four S138-class torpedo boats built for the German Imperial Navy, but was purchased for the Ottoman Navy during construction. (Note: The German Navy classified ships of this type as torpedo boats, but the Ottoman Navy used the classification "muhrip" (destroyer).)

== Design ==
Nümune-i Hamiyet was 74 meters (242 ft 9 in) long at the waterline and 74.2 m (243 ft 5 in) long overall. She had beam (nautical) of 7.9 m (25 ft 11 in) and a draft of 3.04 m (10 ft) forward. The ship had a displacement of 665 t (654 long tons; 733 short tons) as designed and 765 t (753 long tons; 843 short tons) at full load. She had a crew of three officers and eighty-one enlisted men. The ship received two sets of steam turbines, each driving a screw propeller. Steam was provided by four water-tube boilers, three of which burned coal, and the fourth which burned fuel oil. Her propulsion system was rated to produce 17,500 metric horsepower (17,300 shp) for a top speed of 32 knots (59 km/h; 37 mph). She had a cruising radius of 975 nautical miles (1,806 km; 1,122 mi) at a more economical speed of 17 knots (31 km/h; 20 mph).

Nümune-i Hamiyet initially carried a gun armament of two 8.8 cm (3.5 in) SK L/30 guns, along with three 5.2 cm (2 in) SK L/55 guns, all of which were placed in single pivot mounts. The ship's primary offensive armament consisted of three 45 cm (17.7 in) torpedo tubes mounted on the deck individually.

=== Modifications ===
After arriving in the Ottoman Empire, the ship received a new gun armament that consisted of a pair of 75 mm (3 in) guns and two 57 mm (2.2 in) guns. Poor maintenance by her crew reduced the efficiency of her propulsion system, and by 1912, the ship was capable of steaming no more than 26 knots (48 km/h; 30 mph). During World War I, the ship's complement increased to a total of 112, of whom 23 were Germans.

== Service history ==
The keel for the new vessel was laid down in 1908, originally under the name S167, at the Schichau-Werke in Elbing, Germany. The ship was launched on 3 July 1909, and during fitting out, she was sold to the Ottoman Navy and renamed Nümune-i Hamiyet, which means "symbol of patriotism". The purchase of the vessel, along with three of her sister ships—Muavenet-i Milliye, Yadigar-i Millet, and Gayret-i Vataniye—occurred in March 1910, at the same time that the Ottoman government acquired a pair of pre-dreadnought battleships. These were Kurfürst Friedrich Wilhelm and Weissenburg, which were renamed Barbaros Hayreddin and Turgut Reis, respectively when they were transferred on 1 September 1910. The destroyers had already been commissioned into the Ottoman fleet on 17 August. The six ships sailed together from Germany to the Ottoman Empire.

=== Italo-Turkish War ===
At the start of the Italo-Turkish War in September 1911, she was assigned to the main destroyer flotilla, along with her three sisters and the four Samsun-class destroyers. At the start of the war, the Ottoman training fleet, which consisted of the battleship division, the cruiser division, and the destroyer flotilla, was at sea, unaware of the onset of hostilities. On 1 October, an Ottoman steamer informed the fleet that war had begun two days earlier, so the fleet steamed at high speed to the Dardanelles, where it sought refuge behind the coastal fortifications guarding the straits. The fleet briefly went to sea on 4 October but returned to port without engaging any Italian vessels. The fleet saw little activity for the rest of the war, and made no attempt to attack the significantly larger Italian fleet. The naval command expected a war between the Ottoman Empire and the Balkan League and viewed that conflict as a greater threat to the country. They decided to preserve the fleet and prepare it for war, though no repairs were actually carried out.

Late in the conflict, in mid-1912, restive elements of the Ottoman navy and army formed the Military League, aimed at pressuring the Young Turk government for reforms and to protest its mishandling of the war with Italy. On 4 August, Nümune-i Hamiyet carried a delegation of naval officers to Constantinople, where they threatened to bring the rest of the fleet if the government refused to name a naval officer to be the Minister of the Navy, rather than a political crony. They succeeded in securing the appointment of a naval officer to the post, who in turn ordered the fleet to stand down and abstain from further political involvement.

=== First Balkan War ===
By the time of the First Balkan War in late 1912 and early 1913, the Ottoman fleet had been reorganized geographically, and Nümune-i Hamiyet was placed in the Bosporus Fleet, along with most of the other modern units of the Ottoman Navy. Over the course of 21 to 31 October 1913, the ship joined Yadigar-i Millet and the protected cruisers Hamidiye and Mecidiye to carry out a series of raids along the Bulgarian Black Sea coast, including attacks on Bulgarian artillery batteries near Varna. On 30 October, Nümune-i Hamiyet and Barbaros Hayreddin relieved Mecidiye and the destroyer Yarhisar off Midye, where they were guarding troopships landing reinforcements for the Ottoman Army fighting Bulgarian troops. Three days later, Bulgarian forces occupied the city, but neither Ottoman warship opened fire out of fear of hitting their own forces.

By December, the fleet had been reorganized; Nümune-i Hamiyet was assigned to II Division, along with Mecidiye, Gayret-i Vataniye, and Yarhisar. On 14 December, Nümune-i Hamiyet was involved against operations against the Greek fleet in the Aegean Sea; the Ottomans had received faulty reports that the Greek armored cruiser Georgios Averof had run aground off Imbros, so Mecidiye and several destroyers, including Nümune-i Hamiyet, were sent to try to attack Greek vessels in the area. A running battle between Mecidiye and five Greek destroyers ensued, though Nümune-i Hamiyet did not take part in the engagement. Neither side inflicted serious damage on the other, and after the ships disengaged, Nümune-i Hamiyet sent a report of the action to the a naval station at Nara, since Mecidiye's radio had been disabled. The Ottoman ships then regrouped and returned to the safety of the Dardanelles.

Map depicting the maneuvers of the Ottoman (red) and Greek (blue) fleets during the Battle of Elli

The ships of II Division took part in the Battle of Elli on 16 December; they were given the task of screening the Battleship Division on their port flank. In the ensuing action, Georgios Averof crossed in front of the Ottoman fleet and engaged from one side while the three Hydra-class ironclads attacked from the other. This prompted the Ottomans to withdraw to the Dardanelles. Nümune-i Hamiyet and the rest of II Division were relieved by the ironclads Mesudiye and Asar-i Tevfik as they approached the straits. Six days later, Mecidiye sortied with I and II Divisions in an attempt to trap and sink a group of Greek destroyers patrolling off the coast of Anatolia; Mecidiye and I Division were to outflank them and drive the destroyers toward Nümune-i Hamiyet and the rest of II Division, but the Greeks quickly fled after a brief engagement with Mecidiye. The Ottoman destroyers were then sent to patrol off the coast of Tenedos, but they met no Greek vessels there.

The Ottoman Army had become convinced that it could occupy Tenedos and that the fleet could support an amphibious assault on the island, over repeated objections from the naval command. The Ottoman government nevertheless ordered the operation, and on 4 January 1913, the navy decided to make a major sweep toward the island, despite the fact that the regiment assigned to the landing had not yet arrived. Nümune-i Hamiyet and the other II Division ships were among the first vessels to leave the Dardanelles, and they took up a defensive position by around 07:15 near the straits while the other elements of the fleet assembled themselves. During this process, a Greek squadron appeared near Imbros, which prompted the Ottoman destroyers to seek the protection of Mecidiye at about 07:30. Both sides engaged in a brief exchange of gunfire, but neither attempted to close the range. By 10:00, the Ottoman battleships had joined the fleet outside the Dardanelles, and II Division took up a screening position to starboard. An hour and a half later, the fleet had sailed far enough that the Greeks were in a position to block their route to the Dardanelles, so the Ottomans cancelled the operation. At 11:50, they briefly engaged the Greek fleet, which was also retreating, and after forty minutes of firing, neither side had scored a hit. The Ottomans thereafter returned to the Dardanelles.

Shortly thereafter, Nümune-i Hamiyet began to experience problems with her turbines, and she was laid up for repairs. The work was done by April, allowing her to resume operations with the division. Early that month, reports of a Greek cruiser and four destroyers blockading the Gulf of İzmir prompted the Ottoman Navy to dispatch Mecidiye, Nümune-i Hamiyet, Gayret-i Vataniye, and Muavenet-i Milliye to investigate on 8 April. Gayret-i Vataniye was detached to scout the Gulf of Saros and she spotted three Greek destroyers in the distance, but the range was too great to engage them and she rejoined the rest of the flotilla instead. The Ottomans then returned to port. Three days later, Nümune-i Hamiyet sortied with the fleet to support a pair of Ottoman destroyers that had encountered four Greek destroyers off Tenedos. The opposing forces opened fire at long range, but neither side pressed their attack before the Ottomans turned back to the Dardanelles and the Greeks made for Imbros.

=== World War I ===
After the start of World War I in July 1914, the Ottoman Empire officially remained neutral, but the government signed a secret treaty with Germany to eventually enter the war against the Triple Entente. In mid-August, Nümune-i Hamiyet and Gayret-i Vataniye were sent to İzmit to join the flotilla stationed there, as the Ottomans set about strengthening the defenses of the Bosporus and the Dardanelles. When the Ottoman Empire entered World War I in late October 1914, Nümune-i Hamiyet was assigned to I Destroyer Squadron with her three sisters. Nümune-i Hamiyet was in dry dock for repairs at that time, however.

On 9 May 1915, the ex-German battlecruiser Yavuz Sultan Selim sortied from the Bosporus in response to an attack by Russian destroyers. Early the next morning, Nümune-i Hamiyet joined Yavuz Sultan Selim in the search for the Russian ships. After spotting smoke in the distance, Nümune-i Hamiyet was sent to investigate; she initially encountered Russian minesweepers, which she engaged until the Russian pre-dreadnought battleships Tri Sviatitelia and Panteleimon opened fire. Yavuz Sultan Selim then engaged, allowing Nümune-i Hamiyet to withdraw out of range of the Russian guns. In the ensuing action of 10 May 1915, Yavuz Sultan Selim was hit twice but not seriously damaged before also withdrawing.

By July, the Ottoman naval command had resumed convoy operations for colliers transporting coal from Zonguldak. On 3 July, Nümune-i Hamiyet and Gayret-i Vataniye escorted a pair of ships, SS Seyhun and SS Eresos, carrying coal from Constantinople. The next morning, a group of Russian destroyers attacked, but the Ottomans drove them off and successfully brought the ships to Zonguldak. A larger convoy leaves Constantinople on 3 August; the ships include Seyhun, Eresos, SS Zonguldak, and SS Illiria. Nümune-i Hamiyet is assigned to the escort, along with Muavenet-i Millet, the destroyer Taşoz, and Hamidye. Russian destroyers attacked the ships while in Zonguldak on 8 August but neither side scores any hits. The convoy departed to return to Constantinople in the early hours of 10 August, and Yavuz Sultan Selim met them en route. While on the voyage back, lookouts aboard the convoy spotted the Russian submarine Tyulen, which torpedoed and sank Zonguldak. The convoy briefly returned to Zonguldak before getting underway again, arriving in İstinye later that day.

Nümune-i Hamiyet escorted another convoy consisting of Eresos, Illiria, and Seyhun on 4 September. While at sea, they were reinforced by Mecidiye and Muavenet-i Millet early on 5 September, but shortly thereafter, a pair of Russian destroyers attacked. The transports headed closer to shore while Mecidiye briefly attacked the destroyers. The arrival of the Russian submarine Nerpa prompts all three Ottoman warships to fleet, leaving the colliers unprotected. The Russians set all three ships ablaze and drove them ashore, destroying some 10,000 t (9,800 long tons; 11,000 short tons) of coal in the process. Further Russian successes against the collier convoys largely eliminate large-scale coal transportation by the end of 1915, which severely curtails operations by the Ottoman Navy due to lack of fuel.

On 30 October 1916, Admiral Wilhelm Souchon sailed aboard Muavenet-i Millet in company with Nümune-i Hamiyet to Varna, to meet with Field Marshal August von Mackensen, who was leading German Army operations in Romania. On 16 December 1917, the Russian government signed an armistice with the Central Powers, ending the naval war in the Black Sea. By that time, the Ottoman fleet was badly worn out and was no longer able to maintain offensive operations.

On 20 January 1918, Yavuz Sultan Selim and Midilli sortied to attack the British squadron at Imbros, and Nümune-i Hamiyet, Muavenet-i Millet, Samsun and Basra escorted the two ships as far as Sedd el Bahr. Shortly thereafter, Midilli and then Yavuz Sultan Selim struck a series of naval mines, and the four destroyers were ordered to come to Midilli's assistance. A pair of British destroyers, HMS Lizard and Tigress had arrived, and after a brief clash, the Ottoman destroyers withdrew. Shortly thereafter, Yavuz Sultan Selim ran aground off Nara. Over the coming days, Nümune-i Hamiyet and the destroyers Akhisar and Taşoz were stationed at Çanakkale with orders to attack any reported submarines that might try to attack the stranded battlecruiser.

Ottoman troops began re-occupying parts of the country that had been invaded by Russia, and on 1 March, Nümune-i Hamiyet, Muavenet-i Millet, Samsun, and Hamidiye escorted the transport SS Akdeniz with 300 soldiers to Trabzon. On 20 March, she joined Muavenet-i Millet and Hamidiye to cover the German transport SS Patmos bringing occupation troops from Constanța, Romania, to Odessa, Russia. Nümune-i Hamiyet, Muanvent-i Millet, Samsun, and Yavuz Sultan Selim sailed to Novorossiysk, Russia, to supervise the internment of the Russian Black Sea Fleet, but when the Ottomans arrived, they found the Russian fleet had been scuttled. Yavuz Sultan Selim returned to Constantinople, Nümune-i Hamiyet and the other destroyers remained in the port.

Nümune-i Hamiyet was decommissioned in October 1918, and was thereafter used as a storage hulk in Constantinople. On 1 November, the Ottoman Empire surrendered and two days later, the naval command instructed all warships to lower the Ottoman ensign, marking the end of the Ottoman Navy. Nümune-i Hamiyet took no part in the postwar Turkish War of Independence or the concurrent Greco-Turkish War, though she was maintained on the naval register, out of service. The ship was ultimately broken up in 1953.
