= Ottoman destroyer Yadigar-i Millet =

Ottoman destroyer

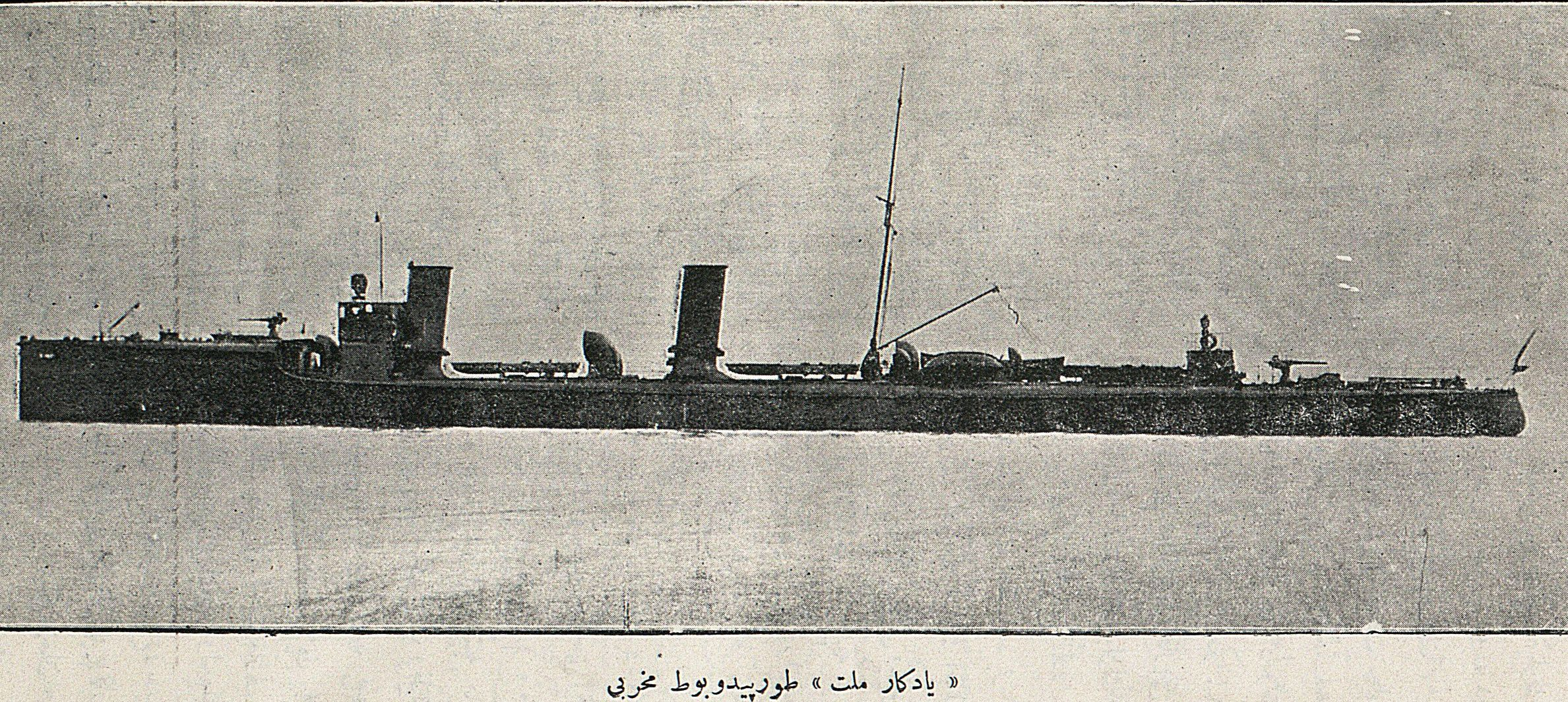
- Torpedo boat Yadigar-i Millet

History

Ottoman Empire
- Name: Yadigar-i Millet
- Builder: Schichau-Werke, Germany
- Laid down: 1908
- Launched: 24 April 1909
- Acquired: March 1910
- Commissioned: 17 August 1910
- Fate: Sunk by British aircraft, 10 July 1917

General characteristics
- Class & type: Muâvenet-i Millîye-class destroyer
- Displacement: Design: 665 t (654 long tons; 733 short tons); Full load: 765 t (753 long tons; 843 short tons)
- Length: 74.2 m (243 ft 5 in) loa
- Beam: 7.9 m (25 ft 11 in)
- Draft: 3.04 m (10 ft)
- Installed power: 4 × water-tube boilers; 17,500 metric horsepower (17,300 shp)
- Propulsion: 2 × steam turbines; 2 × screw propellers
- Speed: 32 knots (59 km/h; 37 mph)
- Range: 975 nmi (1,806 km; 1,122 mi) at 17 knots (31 km/h; 20 mph)
- Crew: 3 officers; 81 enlisted men
- Armament: 2 × 75 mm (3 in) guns; 2 × 57 mm (2.2 in) guns; 3 × 45 cm (17.7 in) torpedo tubes

Yadigar-i Millet, originally built as SMS S166, was one of the four S138-class torpedo boats built for the German Imperial Navy, but was purchased by the Ottoman Navy National Support Association for the Ottoman Navy. (Note: The German Navy classified ships of this type as torpedo boats, but the Ottoman Navy used the classification "muhrip" (destroyer).)

== Design ==
Yadigar-i Millet was 74 meters (242 ft 9 in) long at the waterline and 74.2 m (243 ft 5 in) long overall. She had beam (nautical) of 7.9 m (25 ft 11 in) and a draft of 3.04 m (10 ft) forward. The ship had a displacement of 665 t (654 long tons; 733 short tons) as designed and 765 t (753 long tons; 843 short tons) at full load. She had a crew of three officers and eighty-one enlisted men. The ship received two sets of steam turbines, each driving a screw propeller. Steam was provided by four water-tube boilers, three of which burned coal, and the fourth which burned fuel oil. Her propulsion system was rated to produce 17,500 metric horsepower (17,300 shp) for a top speed of 32 knots (59 km/h; 37 mph). She had a cruising radius of 975 nautical miles (1,806 km; 1,122 mi) at a more economical speed of 17 knots (31 km/h; 20 mph).

Yadigar-i Millet initially carried a gun armament of two 8.8 cm (3.5 in) SK L/30 guns, along with three 5.2 cm (2 in) SK L/55 guns, all of which were placed in single pivot mounts. The ship's primary offensive armament consisted of three 45 cm (17.7 in) torpedo tubes mounted on the deck individually.

=== Modifications ===
After arriving in the Ottoman Empire, the ship received a new gun armament that consisted of a pair of 75 mm (3 in) guns and two 57 mm (2.2 in) guns. Poor maintenance by her crew reduced the efficiency of her propulsion system, and by 1912, the ship was capable of steaming no more than 26 knots (48 km/h; 30 mph). During World War I, the ship's complement increased to a total of 112, of whom 23 were Germans.

== Service history ==
The ship was laid down in 1908, originally named S166, at the Schichau-Werke in Elbing, Germany. She was launched on 24 April 1909, and during fitting out, she was sold to the Ottoman Navy and renamed Yadigar-i Millet, which means "gift of the nation". The purchase of the vessel, along with three of her sister ships—Muavenet-i Milliye, Nümune-i Hamiyet, and Gayret-i Vataniye—occurred in March 1910, at the same time that the Ottoman government acquired a pair of pre-dreadnought battleships. These were Kurfürst Friedrich Wilhelm and Weissenburg, which were renamed Barbaros Hayreddin and Turgut Reis, respectively when they were transferred on 1 September 1910. The destroyers had already been commissioned into the Ottoman fleet on 17 August. The six ships sailed together from Germany to the Ottoman Empire.

At the start of the Italo-Turkish War in September 1911, she was assigned to the main destroyer flotilla, along with her three sisters and the four Samsun-class destroyers. At the start of the war, the Ottoman training fleet, which consisted of the battleship division, the cruiser division, and the destroyer flotilla, was at sea, unaware of the onset of hostilities. On 1 October, an Ottoman steamer informed the fleet that war had begun two days earlier, so the fleet steamed at high speed to the Dardanelles, where it sought refuge behind the coastal fortifications guarding the straits. The fleet briefly went to sea on 4 October but returned to port without engaging any Italian vessels. The fleet saw little activity for the rest of the war, and made no attempt to attack the significantly larger Italian fleet. The naval command expected a war between the Ottoman Empire and the Balkan League and viewed that conflict as a greater threat to the country. They decided to preserve the fleet and prepare it for war, though no repairs were actually carried out.

=== First Balkan War ===
Yadigar-i Millet saw action during the First Balkan War in late 1912 and early 1913. By that time, the Ottoman fleet had been reorganized geographically, and Yadigar-i Millet was placed in the Bosporus Fleet, along with most of the other modern units of the Ottoman Navy. Over the course of 21 to 31 October 1913, the ship joined Nümune-i Hamiyet and the protected cruisers Hamidiye and Mecidiye to carry out a series of raids along the Bulgarian Black Sea coast, including attacks on Bulgarian artillery batteries near Varna. By December, the fleet had been reorganized; Yadigar-i Millet was assigned to I Division, along with the torpedo cruiser Berk-i Satvet and the destroyers Basra, Taşoz, and Muavenet-i Milliye. By that time, the fleet's attention had turned to the Greek fleet operating against the Ottoman coast in the Aegean Sea. The Ottoman command planned a minor operation for 12 December, which envisioned using Basra and Taşoz to lure nearby Greek destroyers into an ambush that was to be launched by Yadigar-i Millet and her sister Muavenet-i Milliye. The first pair of destroyers developed boiler problems, however, and the operation was cancelled.

Map depicting the maneuvers of the Ottoman (red) and Greek (blue) fleets during the Battle of Elli

The ships of I Division took part in the Battle of Elli on 16 December; they were given the task of screening the Battleship Division on their starboard flank. In the ensuing action, Georgios Averof crossed in front of the Ottoman fleet, which exposed her to an attack from I Division, but the Ottomans failed to exploit it. Georgios Averof then engaged the Ottoman battleships from one side while the three Hydra-class ironclads attacked from the other. This prompted the Ottomans to withdraw to the Dardanelles. After arriving of the straits, I Division sailed on toward Tenedos, where they met a group of Greek destroyers. They engaged in a brief and inconclusive artillery duel before both sides disengaged. On 22 December, the ships of I Division sortied with Mecidiye in an attempt to sink Greek destroyers that were patrolling off the Anatolian coast. Mecidiye and Berk-i Satvet briefly engaged a group of six destroyers, but Yadigar-i Millet and the rest of the division don't close before the Greek ships turn and flee. After another brief action between the Ottoman cruisers and a single Greek destroyer, the Ottoman naval command ordered the cruisers to return to port, but Yadigar-i Millet and the other destroyers were sent to patrol off Tenedos for two hours, before they too were recalled.

The Ottoman Army had become convinced that it could occupy Tenedos and that the fleet could support an amphibious assault on the island, over repeated objections from the naval command. The Ottoman government nevertheless ordered the operation, and on 4 January 1913, the navy decided to make a major sweep toward the island, despite the fact that the regiment assigned to the landing had not yet arrived. Yadigar-i Millet and the other I Division ships were among the first vessels to leave the Dardanelles, and they took up a defensive position by around 07:15 near the straits while the other elements of the fleet assembled themselves. During this process, a Greek squadron appeared near Imbros, which prompted the Ottoman destroyers to seek the protection of Mecidiye at about 07:30. Both sides engaged in a brief exchange of gunfire, but neither attempted to close the range. By 10:00, the Ottoman battleships had joined the fleet outside the Dardanelles, and I Division took up a screening position to port. An hour and a half later, the fleet had sailed far enough that the Greeks were in a position to block their route to the Dardanelles, so the Ottomans cancelled the operation. At 11:50, they briefly engaged the Greek fleet, which was also retreating, and after forty minutes of firing, neither side had scored a hit. The Ottomans thereafter returned to the Dardanelles.

After a series of inconclusive engagements between Ottoman cruisers and Greek destroyers in early January, the Ottoman naval command decided to make a major attack on Imbros in an attempt to lure out Greek warships. The bulk of the fleet sortied on the morning of 10 January; Yadigar-i Millet and the rest of I Division took up a screening position to the north of the fleet. Reports of the Greek fleet in the area prompted the Ottoman commander to order the screening cruisers and destroyers to rejoin the battleships and then return to the Dardanelles. After the fleet resumed its cruising formation around mid-day, the battleships briefly engaged three Greek destroyers at long range, which quickly retreated. The Ottomans thereafter entered the Dardanelles.

On 11 April, Yadigar-i Millet and Gayret-i Vataniye sortied and encountered a pair of Greek destroyers off Tenedos. The Ottoman naval command ordered them to shadow the Greeks while the rest of the fleet got underway. By that time, another pair of destroyers had reinforced the Greek ships, and after the Ottoman fleet arrived, they attacked the Ottoman ships at long range. Neither side closed the range before the Ottomans turned back to the Dardanelles and the Greeks made for Imbros.

=== World War I ===
When the Ottoman Empire entered World War I in late October 1914, Yadigar-i Millet was assigned to I Destroyer Squadron with her three sisters. In early April 1915, the ship was part of an operation against Russian forces in the Black Sea. The Ottoman force consisted of the battlecruiser Yavuz Sultan Selim, the light cruiser Midilli, Hamidiye, Mecidiye, and an escort of destroyers that included Yadigar-i Millet. During the attack on Odessa, Russia, on 3 April, Mecidiye struck a naval mine and sank in shallow water. Yadigar-i Millet was sent to torpedo the vessel to prevent her from being captured by the Russians. The torpedo did not inflict sufficiently severe damage to prevent the Russians from refloating, repairing, and eventually commissioning the vessel into the Russian fleet. In May, she carried a contingent of Germans across the Bosporus during their trek back to Germany, after their ship, the protected cruiser Emden, had been sunk at the Battle of Cocos the year before. Yadigar-i Millet disembarked the men at Constantinople on 23 May.

On 1 July, the British submarine HMS E14 launched a torpedo at Yadigar-i Millet while the latter was cruising in the Sea of Marmara, but it failed to hit. Two weeks later, Yadigar-i Millet carried a load of fuel oil to Zonguldak for a group of German U-boats that was operating out of the port. Early on 10 July 1917, a British Royal Naval Air Service Handley Page Type O bomber, flying from Moudros, Greece, attempted to bomb Yavuz Sultan Selim with eight 112 lb (51 kg) bombs from an altitude of 800 ft (240 m). The bombs missed their target, but hit and sank Yadigar-i Millet instead, which had been moored alongside Yavuz Sultan Selim. Yadigar-i Millet was the largest ship sunk by air during the First World War. Twenty-nine men were killed in the sinking. On 24 October, the Ottomans refloated the ship and towed her to the Imperial Arsenal on the Golden Horn, where she was moored in December. She sank there at some point afterward, before being raised a second time in 1924, at which time she was broken up.
