= French ship Turquoise =

At least four ships of the French Navy have been named Turquoise:

- French schooner Turquoise (1824), a Iris-class schooner in service 1824–1831
- French aviso Turquoise (1840), a Biche-class aviso in service 1840–1864.
- French submarine Turquoise (1908), an Émeraude-class submarine launched in 1908 and captured by the Ottoman Empire in 1915.
- French submarine Turquoise (1929), a Saphir-class submarine launched in 1929 and scuttled in 1943.
