= Black Sea raid =

Ottoman naval sortie against Russian ports in WW1

- Part of World War I
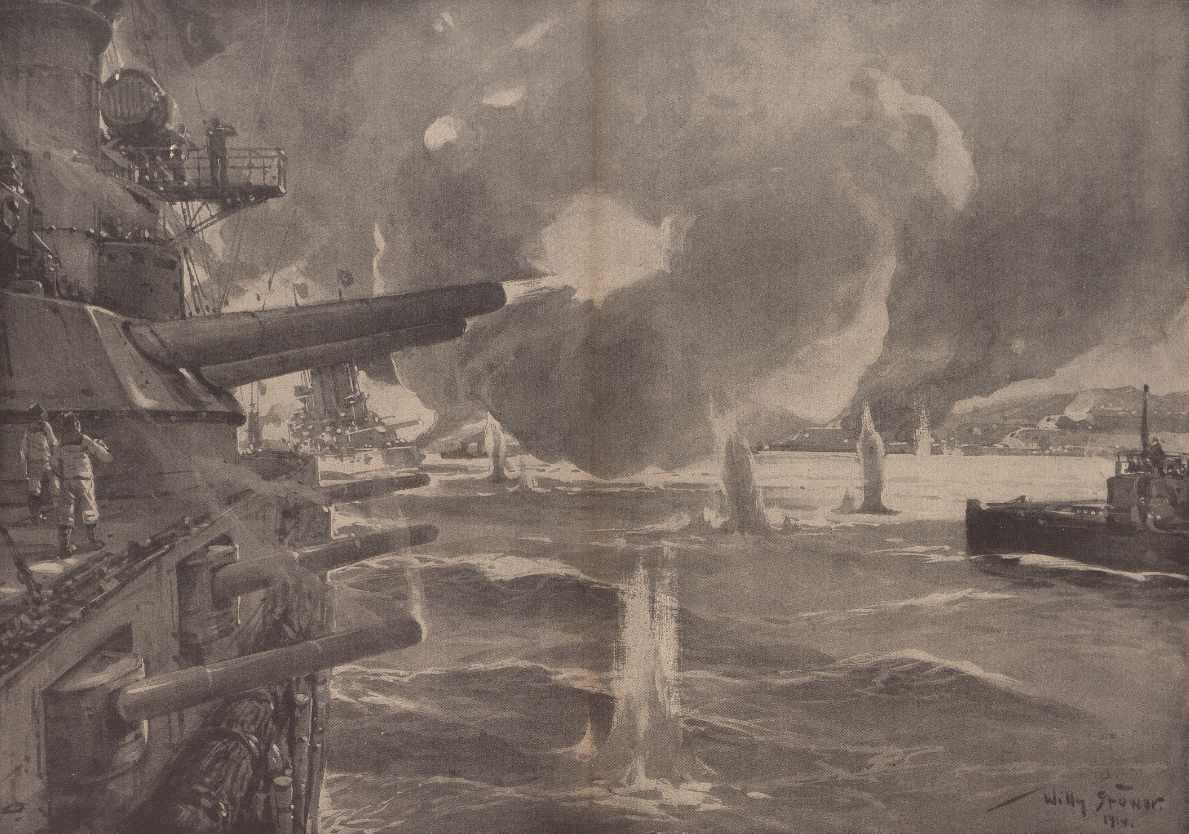
- Shelling of Sevastopol by the Turkish Fleet on 30. October 1914 (illustration by W. Stöwer)
Date	29 October 1914 (Note: Because of the different calendars used at the time, contemporary Russian sources date the raid to 16 October 1914 O.S. using the Julian calendar; Turkish sources to 16 Teşrin-i Evvel 1330 using the Rumi calendar.)
Location	Black Sea 44°N 35°E
Result	Ottoman victory: Ottoman entry into World War I

Belligerents
Ottoman Empire	Russian Empire

Commanders and leaders
(Ottoman Empire) (German Empire) Wilhelm Souchon	(Russian Empire) Andrei Eberhardt

Strength
1 battlecruiser 1 light cruiser 1 protected cruiser 1 torpedo cruiser 4 destroyers 1 gunboat	Shore defences 1 pre-dreadnought 1 minelayer 1 gunboat 3 destroyers

Casualties and losses
1 battlecruiser damaged	1 minelayer scuttled 1 gunboat sunk 1 destroyer damaged Numerous merchant vessels damaged or destroyed (Note: The number of merchantmen damaged and destroyed is disputed. Erickson and Sondhaus claim that only 6 vessels were lost. Dowling and Tucker state that the total casualties from the entire raid amount to 6 vessels sunk and around 12 damaged. McMeekin and Miller state that 14 vessels alone were sunk at Novorossiysk but McMeekin later lowered that estimate to 12 vessels sunk.); Unknown human losses (Note: Most sources do not list any statistics on Russia's human losses. Kieser states that the Ottomans "took dozens of crew prisoners-of-war." The Ottoman press claimed that 75 sailors were captured.)

The Black Sea raid was an Ottoman naval sortie against Russian ports in the Black Sea on 29 October 1914, supported by Germany, that led to the Ottoman entry into World War I. The attack was conceived by Ottoman War Minister Enver Pasha, German Admiral Wilhelm Souchon, and the German foreign ministry.

The German government had been hoping that the Ottomans would enter the war to support them but the government in Istanbul was undecided. The Germanophile Ottoman War Minister, Enver Pasha, began conspiring with the German ambassador to bring the empire into the war. Attempts to secure widespread support in the government failed, so Enver decided to instigate conflict. With the help of the Ottoman naval minister and German Admiral Wilhelm Souchon, Enver arranged for the Ottoman fleet to go out to sea on 29 October supposedly to perform maneuvers. They were to provoke Russian vessels into opening fire and then accuse them of inciting war. Instead, Souchon raided the Russian coast in a flagrant display of hostility, causing little lasting damage but enraging the Russians.

Enver impeded attempts by anti-war officials in Istanbul to apologise for the incident. The Russians declared war on the Ottoman Empire on 2 November, followed by the British and the French three days later; the British quickly initiated naval attacks in the Dardanelles. The Ottomans did not officially declare war until 11 November.

== Background ==
In the months before the outbreak of World War I, officials of the Ottoman Empire vainly tried to secure an alliance with a great power. The Germanophile Ottoman War Minister Enver Pasha directly proposed an alliance on 22 July 1914 to the German ambassador in Istanbul, Hans Freiherr von Wangenheim, but he was rebuffed. Kaiser Wilhelm II overruled Wangenheim two days later, and an Ottoman draft for an alliance was delivered in Berlin on 28 July—the day World War I began. The July Crisis had climaxed and it appeared Germany would be fighting a two-front war with France and Russia. With the Germans hesitant to make any more significant military obligations, Wangenheim was authorised by German Chancellor Theobald von Bethmann Hollweg to sign the agreement only if the Ottoman Empire would "undertake action against Russia worthy of its name." On 1 August, Enver offered Wangenheim the new battleship Sultân Osmân-ı Evvel in exchange for German protection. This was likely a clever ploy; United Kingdom officials, in order to bolster the Royal Navy to wage war against Germany, had already seized Sultan Osman-ı Evvel and the battleship Reşadiye, which were under construction in their shipyards. Wagenheim and the majority of the Ottoman government were unaware of this. Enver probably already knew of the seizure, since actually releasing the battleship to a foreign nation would have caused an uproar from the public and the government. Ambassador Wagenheim signed the treaty the next day, creating the secret Ottoman–German alliance.

However, the alliance did not automatically bring the Ottomans into the war as Germany had hoped. The literal wording of the treaty obligated Germany to oppose any foreign infringements on Ottoman territory—particularly by Russia—but only required that the Ottoman Empire assist Germany as per the latter's own terms with Austria-Hungary. Since Germany had proactively declared war on Russia several days before Austria-Hungary, the Ottoman Empire was not compelled to join the conflict. Grand Vizier Said Halim Pasha and Finance Minister Djavid Bey were opposed to Ottoman involvement in the war and viewed the alliance as a passive agreement. Other Ottoman officials were hesitant to rush into an armed conflict following the disastrous First Balkan War, especially considering the possibility that the Balkan states might attack the Empire should it become belligerent.

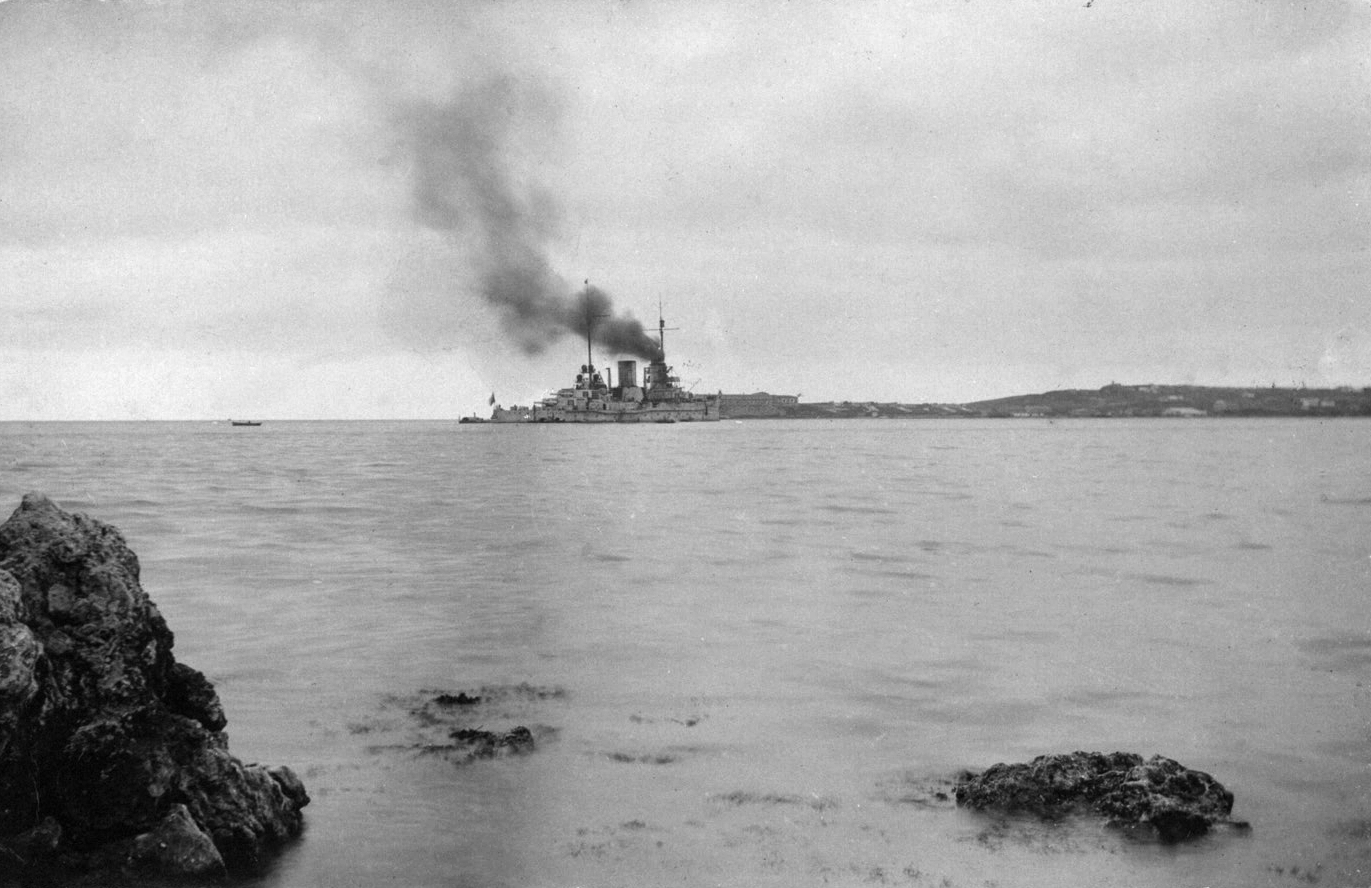
Ottoman battlecruiser Yavuz Sultan Selim (formerly SMS Goeben) in Sevastopol, 1918, after Russia withdrew from World War I with the Treaty of Brest-Litovsk

Meanwhile, in the Mediterranean, the German battlecruiser SMS Goeben and the light cruiser SMS Breslau were cruising off of French Algeria. Admiral Wilhelm Souchon, the squadron's commander, had been holding his position in order to interfere with Triple Entente troop convoys. He had received orders on 3 August that his ships should retreat to Ottoman waters, but chose to linger for one day and shell two ports. It had already been arranged on 1 August between the Germans and Enver that Souchon's squadron would be allowed safe passage. While coaling in Messina, Souchon received a telegram rescinding these orders, as other Ottoman officials now learning of Enver's deal objected to the plan. Despite the development, Souchon resolved to continue towards the Ottoman Empire, having concluded that an attempt to return to Germany would result in his ships' destruction at the hands of the British and the French and a withdrawal to the Austro-Hungarian coast would leave them trapped in the Adriatic Sea for the remainder of the war. With the Royal Navy in close pursuit, Souchon continued east, feinting a retreat towards Austria-Hungary in an attempt to confuse the British. To make the ruse more convincing, Austrian Admiral Anton Haus sortied south with a large fleet in a maneuver meant to appear like a rendezvous with Souchon. Once the latter reached Greek waters, the former returned to port. The Germans insisted that Haus follow Souchon to Istanbul so that his ships could support an anticipated campaign against the Russians in the Black Sea, but the Austrian admiral thought that the Ottoman capital would make for a poor base of operations and did not want to leave Austria-Hungary's coast undefended. Meanwhile, Souchon approached the Ottoman Empire, which still had not authorised his ships' entry to its waters. On 8 August, he decided to force the issue and dispatched a support vessel to Istanbul with a message for the German naval attaché to give to the Ottomans: he needed immediate passage through Dardanelles on the grounds of "military necessity" and was prepared to enter them "without formal approval." On the morning of 10 August, Souchon was given permission to enter the straits.

The day before, the Ottoman government had proposed to Wangenheim that a fictitious purchase of the German ships be arranged, so their presence would not compromise Ottoman neutrality. The next day the German Chancellor cabled Wangenheim, rejecting the idea and demanding that the Ottomans immediately join the war. The Grand Vizier accosted Wangenheim for the premature arrival of the ships and repeated the demand for a fictitious sale. The Ottoman government subsequently declared that it had purchased both ships for 80 million German marks. On 14 August, Wangenheim advised the German government that it would be best to go along with the sale, lest they risk angering the Ottomans.

On 16 August, the ships were formally integrated into the Ottoman Navy while their crews were given new uniforms and formally reenlisted. The British had thought this action was meant to counterbalance their seizure of the Ottoman battleships, but this was not strictly the case. The Ottomans feared the Entente, particularly Russia, would attempt to partition the empire if they won the war, whereas Germany and Austria-Hungary would not. Once the British became aware of this, they feared that the Ottomans were more likely to enter the conflict in Germany's favour. Following Russia's failures in its operations against Germany in late August, Russian incursion in Ottoman territory seemed unlikely. Meanwhile, the Ottoman officials reached neutrality agreements with the governments of Greece and Romania while Bulgaria displayed pro-German tenancies, alleviating their fears of a Balkan threat. Enver then began to move his defensive policy towards an aggressive one.

== Prelude ==
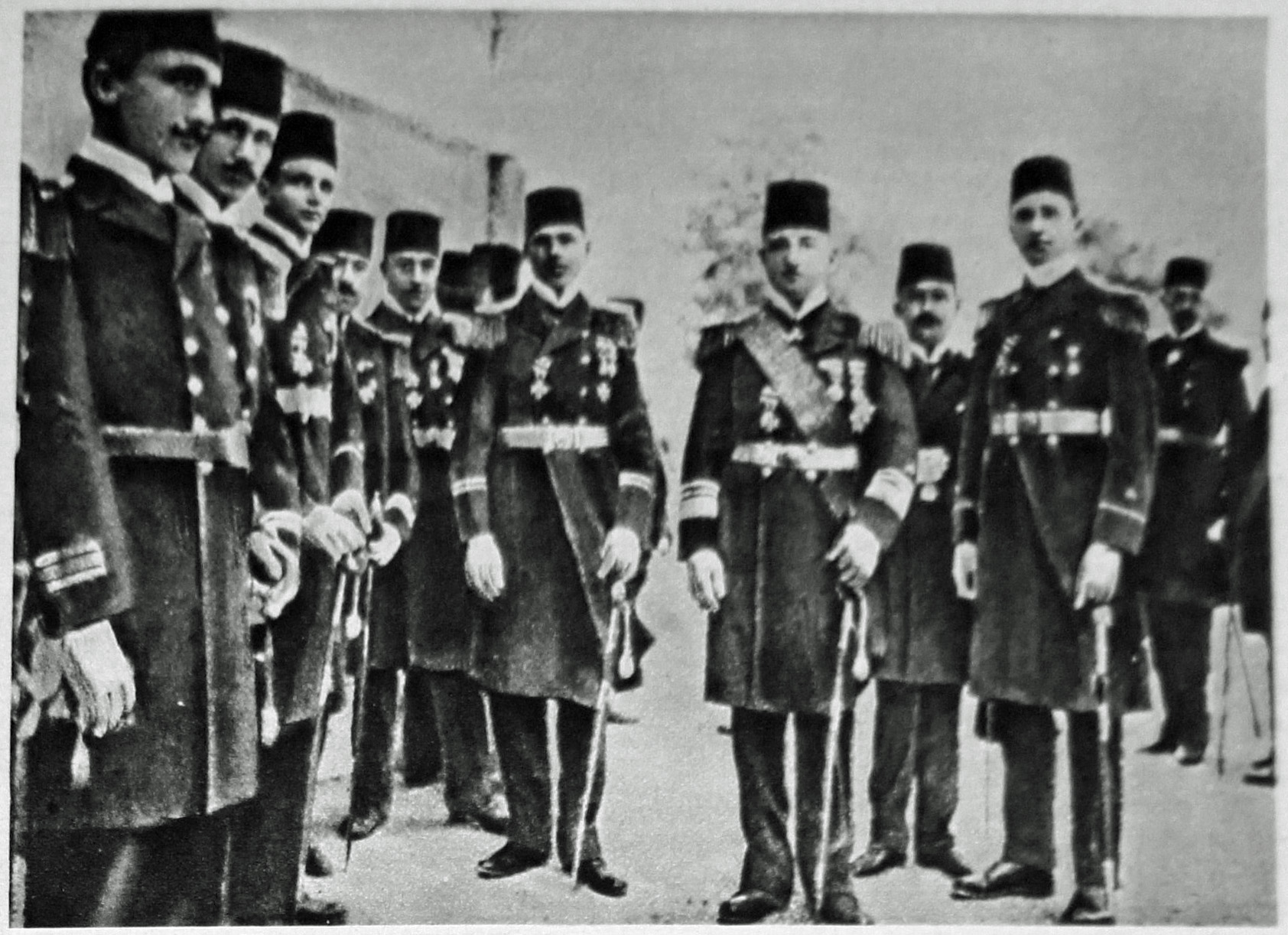
Admiral Wilhelm Souchon and his officers in Ottoman naval uniforms

In a discussion over the weekend of 12–13 September, Enver gave Souchon permission to take his ships into the Black Sea to perform maneuvers. The Ottoman naval minister, Ahmed Djemal, discovered Souchon's plans and strictly forbade him from moving out of the Bosphorus. The Ottoman cabinet debated the matter over the next few days, and on 17 September Enver told Souchon that his authorisation to operate in the Black Sea was "withdrawn until further notice". Furious, Souchon went ashore the next day and berated Grand Vizier Halim for his government's "faithless and indecisive behavior", while threatening to take matters into his own hands and to "behave as dictated by the conscience of a military officer". Souchon subsequently demanded that Enver, at the very least, allow the German light cruiser to stage exercises near the mouth of the Bosphorus with several Ottoman destroyers. Here Souchon hoped the ships could engage the Russian Black Sea Fleet and bring the Ottoman Empire into the war. Enver promised to do what he could.

On 24 September Souchon became an Ottoman vice admiral and commander-in-chief of the Ottoman Navy. Two days later, without consulting his colleagues, Enver ordered the closing of the Dardanelles to foreign shipping. This had an immediate effect on the Russian economy, as nearly half of the country's exports traveled through the straits.

On 9 October Enver told Ambassador Wangenheim that he had won the sympathy of Minister of the Interior Mehmed Talaat and of the President of the Chamber of Deputies Halil Menteşe, and that he planned on securing the support of Djemal. If that failed, he would provoke a cabinet crisis and create a pro-war government. After gaining Djemal's sympathies, the conspiring Ottomans informed the Germans that they would go to war as soon as they received the equivalent of two million lira in gold, money which the Germans knew the Ottoman Empire would need to fund a war. Berlin shipped the gold through neutral Romania, and the last of it arrived on 21 October. Informants working for the Russian ambassador in Istanbul, Mikhail Nikolayevich von Giers, forwarded information about the payments to Russian Foreign Minister Sergey Sazonov. Sazonov had suspected the Ottomans' and Germans' intentions, and warned the Russian naval commanders in Sebastopol to be prepared for an attack. On 21 October, Admiral Kazimir Ketlinski assured Sazonov that the Black Sea Fleet was "completely ready" for action.

On 22 October 1914, Enver covertly presented a series of plans to Wangenheim on how to bring the Ottomans into the war. The Germans approved of an attack on Russian naval forces. At the last minute Talaat and Menteşe changed their minds and resolved that the Ottomans should keep the gold and remain neutral, though Talaat soon reverted to his former position. Enver gave up on trying to unify the government to pass a declaration of war; he concluded that the Russians would need to be provoked into declaring war. He told the Germans this on 23 October, and assured them that he would only need Minister Djemal's support to achieve his goals. The next day Enver told Admiral Souchon he should take the fleet into the Black Sea and attack Russian ships if a "suitable opportunity presented itself". Djemal then secretly ordered all Ottoman naval officers to strictly follow Souchon's directives.

On 25 October, the Russian ambassador in Istanbul, Giers, forwarded to Sazonov the predictions of one of his informants: the attack would take place on 29 October.

== Raid ==
=== Sortie ===
The routes of the ships involved in the Black Sea raid

On 27 October, the Ottoman fleet put to sea under the guise of performing maneuvers. Enver had originally envisioned an encounter at sea in which the Ottomans would claim self-defence, but Admiral Souchon conceived a direct assault on Russian ports. He would later say his intention was "to force the Turks, even against their will, to spread the war." The German battlecruiser, now known as Yavuz Sultan Selim, was to sail with two destroyers and a gunboat to attack Sebastopol. The light cruiser Breslau, now known as Midilli, protected cruiser Hamidieh, and the torpedo cruiser Berk-i Satvet were to attack Novorossiysk and Feodosia. Three destroyers were detailed for Odessa. On the way, one of these destroyers experienced engine trouble and was forced to turn back. Russian naval officers were under specific instruction not to fire first on the Ottomans in the event of a confrontation. The Russian government wanted to make it clear to any third party that the Ottomans would be the ones to instigate hostilities.

=== Attacks ===
==== Odessa ====
Shortly after 03:00 on 29 October, the destroyers Muavenet and Gairet entered the harbour of Odessa. From a distance about 70 yards (64 m), a torpedo was launched into the Russian gunboat Donetz, quickly sinking it. The two destroyers proceeded to damage merchant vessels, shore installations, five oil tanks, and a sugar refinery. The destroyers had conducted their raid earlier than Souchon had intended, and the Russians managed to radio a warning to the forces in Sebastopol. By the time Yavuz arrived, the coastal artillery was manned.

==== Sebastopol ====
Just before 06:30, Yavuz sighted Sebastopol and proceeded to bombard the port for 15 minutes. During this time she exchanged fire with the pre-dreadnought Georgii Pobedonosets and with shore batteries. Three heavy-caliber shells from the batteries managed to damage Yavuz before she withdrew. The loaded Russian minelayer Prut happened upon the attack and was scuttled by her crew to avoid being detonated. Since The Russian Black Sea Fleet had expected Prut's arrival, the defensive minefield around the port was inoperative. By the time it was re-activated 20 minutes later, the Ottomans had cleared the area. Three Russian destroyers attempted to pursue, but their attack dissolved after German guns shelled the lead ship, Leitenant Pushchin.

==== Feodosia and Yalta ====
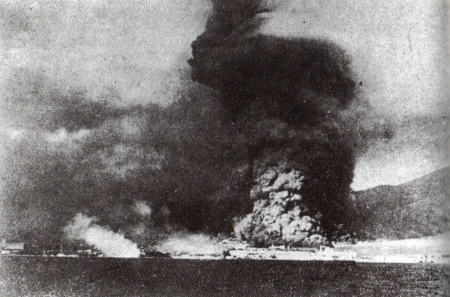
Novorossiysk harbour bombarded by the Ottoman cruiser Midilli (formerly SMS Breslau)

At around the same time Hamidieh arrived off of Feodosia. Seeing no signs of armed opposition, a German and a Turkish officer went ashore to warn the civilian population before bombarding the port two hours later. After attacking Feodosia, Hamidieh bombarded Yalta, setting several granaries on fire.

==== Novorossiysk ====
Shortly before 10:50, Berk-i Satvet sent a shore party to warn the defenceless population of Novorossiysk, before opening up with her guns. She was soon thereafter joined by Midilli, which had been busy laying mines in the Kerch Strait. Midilli fired a total of 308 shells, sinking several Russian grain cargo ships and destroying about 50 oil tanks. On their way back to Ottoman territory, Midilli's crew attempted to cut Sebastopol's undersea telegraph cable with Varna, Bulgaria, but failed.

== Aftermath ==
On the afternoon following the raid, Souchon radioed Istanbul that Russian ships had "shadowed all movements of the Turkish fleet and systematically disrupted all exercises," and as such had "opened hostilities." The Russians attempted to but were unable to pursue the Ottoman fleet. The raiding force returned to Ottoman waters on 1 November.

The Ottoman press reported the action on 31 October, claiming that the Russians had planned on mining the Bosphorus and destroying their fleet without a formal declaration of war, compelling the Ottoman navy to retaliate after an engagement at sea by bombarding the Russian coast.

German military officers were disappointed by the limited extent of the attack, which ultimately achieved more political goals than strategic ones. Russia's Black Sea Fleet was not seriously damaged by the raid. The gunboat Donetz was later raised and returned to service.

=== Ramifications ===
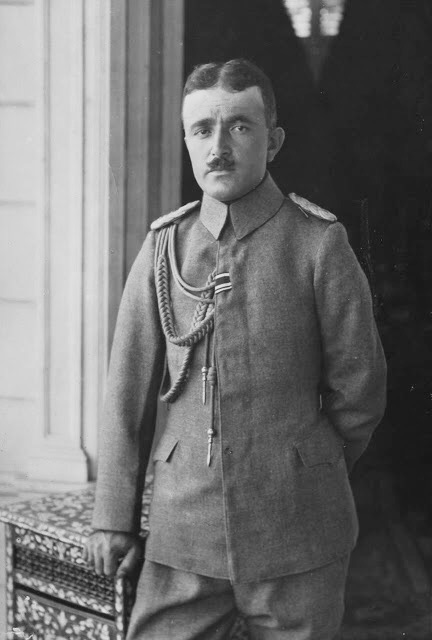
Ottoman War Minister Enver Pasha

A two-day political crisis followed the raid. It was obvious to the Ottoman government that Enver had allowed the attack to occur. As soon as the news of the event reached Istanbul, the Grand Vizier and the Cabinet forced Enver to wire a ceasefire order to Souchon. Several officials, including the Grand Vizier, threatened to resign in protest of the raid. Four later would, including Djavid Bey. Though many in the government thought it opportune to attack Russia, cabinet solidarity was regarded as vital and a letter of apology was soon drafted. On 31 October Enver informed the Germans of the planned apology and said there was nothing he could do.

The British, ill-informed of the situation in Istanbul, believed the entire Ottoman government was conspiring with the Germans. The British Cabinet sent an ultimatum to the Ottomans, demanding that they remove Admiral Souchon and his German subordinates from their posts and expel Germany's military mission, which consisted of approximately 2,000 men. The Ottomans did not comply. On 31 October, First Lord of the Admiralty Winston Churchill, acting on his own initiative, ordered British forces in the Mediterranean to commence hostilities against the Ottoman Empire. This was not carried out immediately, so the Ottomans were unaware of what had transpired. The Russian Foreign Ministry withdrew Ambassador Girs from Istanbul.

Meanwhile, Enver, still fearing that the Russians would accept the Ottoman apology, decided to interfere. Just before the message was sent, he inserted a passage that accused the Russians of instigating the conflict. On 1 November the message arrived in Petrograd. Foreign Minister Sazonov responded with an ultimatum, demanding that the Ottomans expel the German military mission. The Ottomans rejected this proposal.

That same day British forces in the Mediterranean carried out Churchill's orders by attacking Ottoman merchant vessels off of the port of İzmir. That night at an Ottoman Cabinet meeting, the Grand Vizier's anti-war faction was forced to accept that the Empire was at war, and that there was little they could do to avoid conflict. The Russians declared war on the Ottoman Empire on 2 November 1914. Admiral Andrei Eberhardt immediately ordered Russia's fleet to retaliate against the Ottomans for the raid. On 4 November, a Russian task force bombarded Zonguldak.

On 3 November British warships bombarded outer forts in the Dardanelles. Two days later the United Kingdom extended a declaration of war to the Ottoman Empire, as did France. Due to these attacks, there was a common impression in Britain that Churchill had brought the Ottomans into the war. Prime Minister Lloyd George held this belief for several years to come. In the meantime, Churchill tried to promote the advantages of the conflict, such as the possibility of territorial gains in the Middle East (the reason that would ultimately bring Italy and Balkans nations like Greece into the war). The Ottoman government finally declared war on the Triple Entente on 11 November. Three days later Ottoman Sultan Mehmed V called for a Jihad campaign by Sunni and Shia Muslims against the Entente powers.
