= Douglas Gamble =

Royal Navy Admiral (1856–1934)

Admiral Sir Douglas Gamble KCVO
- Born: 8 November 1856
- Died: 23 May 1934 (aged 77)
- Military career
- Allegiance: United Kingdom
- Branch: Royal Navy
- Service years: 1870-1917
- Rank: Admiral
- Commands: HMS Hyacinth; HMS Kent; HMS Canopus; HMS Vernon; 4th Battle Squadron
- Conflicts: World War I
- Awards: Knight Commander of the Royal Victorian Order

Admiral Sir Douglas Austin Gamble KCVO (8 November 1856 – 23 May 1934) was a Royal Navy officer who commanded the 4th Battle Squadron.

== Naval career ==
Gamble joined the Royal Navy in 1870. After serving in the Naval Intelligence Department at the Admiralty from 1893, he became commanding officer of the protected cruiser HMS Hyacinth in 1902, commanding officer of the armoured cruiser HMS Kent in 1903 and commanding officer of the battleship HMS Canopus in 1905 before becoming commanding officer of the torpedo school HMS Vernon in 1907.

Gamble became Naval Advisor to the Turkish Government in 1909 and Commander of the 6th Cruiser Squadron in 1910. The Census 1911 shows him on HMS Bacchante with his Flag Captain Reginald Tyrwhitt and Flag Lieutenant Bertram Ramsay. He then served in World War I as Commander of the 4th Battle Squadron with his flag in the battleship HMS Benbow from 1914 before joining the Naval War Staff at the Admiralty in 1915 and retiring in 1917.
