= Ottoman cruiser Mecidiye =

Protected cruiser of the Ottoman Navy

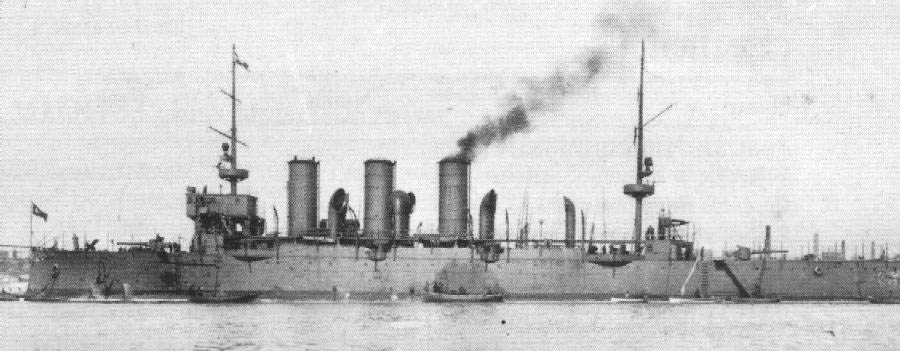
- Ottoman cruiser Mecidiye

History

Ottoman Empire
- Name: Mecidiye
- Ordered: 1900
- Builder: William Cramp & Sons, Philadelphia
- Yard number: 315
- Laid down: 7 November 1901
- Launched: 25 July 1903
- Commissioned: 19 December 1903
- Fate: Struck mine and sank near Odessa on 3 April 1915. Salvaged by the Russians on 8 June 1915 and joined the Russian Navy as Prut on 29 October 1915. Returned to the Ottoman Navy on 13 May 1918.

General characteristics
- Type: Protected cruiser
- Displacement: 3,485 t (normal draught); 3,967 t (full load)
- Length: 102.4 m (336 ft) (LOA); 100.5 m (330 ft) (LPP)
- Beam: 12.8 m (42 ft)
- Draught: 4.8 m (16 ft)
- Propulsion: Machinery: Steam, 2 shafts; Engines: 2 × VQE engines producing 12,500 ihp (9,321 kW), William Cramp & Sons; Boilers: 16 × Babcock & Wilcox water-tube boilers
- Speed: 22 knots (full speed in trials); 18 knots (normal cruising speed)
- Complement: 302 (1903); 355 (1915); 310 (1936)
- Armament: 2 × 152 mm QF L/45 guns; 8 × 120 mm QF L/45 guns; 6 × 47 mm QF guns; 6 × 37mm QF guns; 2 × 457 mm torpedo tubes

Russian Empire
- Name: Prut
- Yard number: Sevastopol Shipyard, ROPiT Yard, Odessa
- Acquired: Raised on 31 May 1915.; Salvaged on 8 June 1915.
- Commissioned: 29 October 1915
- Fate: Captured by German forces on 1 May 1918 and returned to the Ottoman Navy on May 13, 1918.

General characteristics Prut
- Type: Protected cruiser
- Displacement: 3,250 tons
- Length: 102.4 m (336 ft)
- Beam: 12.8 m (42 ft)
- Draught: 4.8 m (16 ft)
- Propulsion: 2 VQE; 12,500 hp
- Speed: 17.9 knots
- Armament: 6 × 130 mm guns; 4 × 130 mm guns; 4 × 75 mm AA guns

Ottoman Empire/Turkey
- Name: Mecidiye
- Acquired: 13 May 1918
- Decommissioned: 1 March 1947
- Fate: Used as a cadet training ship between 1940 and 1947, sold for scrap in 1952.

Mecidiye (in older publications also spelled as Medjidiye, or Médjidié) was a protected cruiser of the Ottoman Empire that saw action during the Balkan Wars and World War I. It was ordered by the Ottoman Navy in 1900 to the United States shipbuilding company William Cramp & Sons. It was laid down in Philadelphia on 7 November 1901; launched on 25 July 1903; its sea trials began in October 1903; and it was commissioned on 19 December 1903. It weighed 3,485 tons (3,967 tons full load); was 102.4 metres (336 ft) long with a beam of 12.8 metres (42 ft) and a draught of 4.8 metres (16 ft); and was named after the Ottoman Sultan Abdülmecid.

It had two 152mm L/45 quick firing guns, eight 120mm L/45 quick firing guns, six 47mm quick firing guns, six 37mm quick firing guns, and two 457mm torpedo tubes. Mecidiye was powered by two sets of VQE steam engines producing 12,500 ihp (9,321 kW) and providing a top speed of 22 knots (41 km/h; 25 mph), and carried a nominal complement of 302 (in 1903), 355 (in 1915), and 310 (in 1936.)

== History ==
Mecidiye, named after Sultan Abdülmecid I, was launched on 25 July 1903 and commissioned on 19 December 1903.

=== Balkan Wars ===
In October 1912, Mecidiye shelled Bulgarian forts near Varna and other military targets. On 9 December, she was attacked by the Greek submarine Delfin at 800 meters, but the torpedo missed. Mecidiye also participated in the two major naval battles of the war, against the Greek Navy, at Elli (16 December 1912) and Lemnos (18 January 1913), suffering slight damage in the first. On 18 February 1913, Mecidiye was part of the covering naval force for the Ottoman shore landing at Şarköy.

=== World War I ===
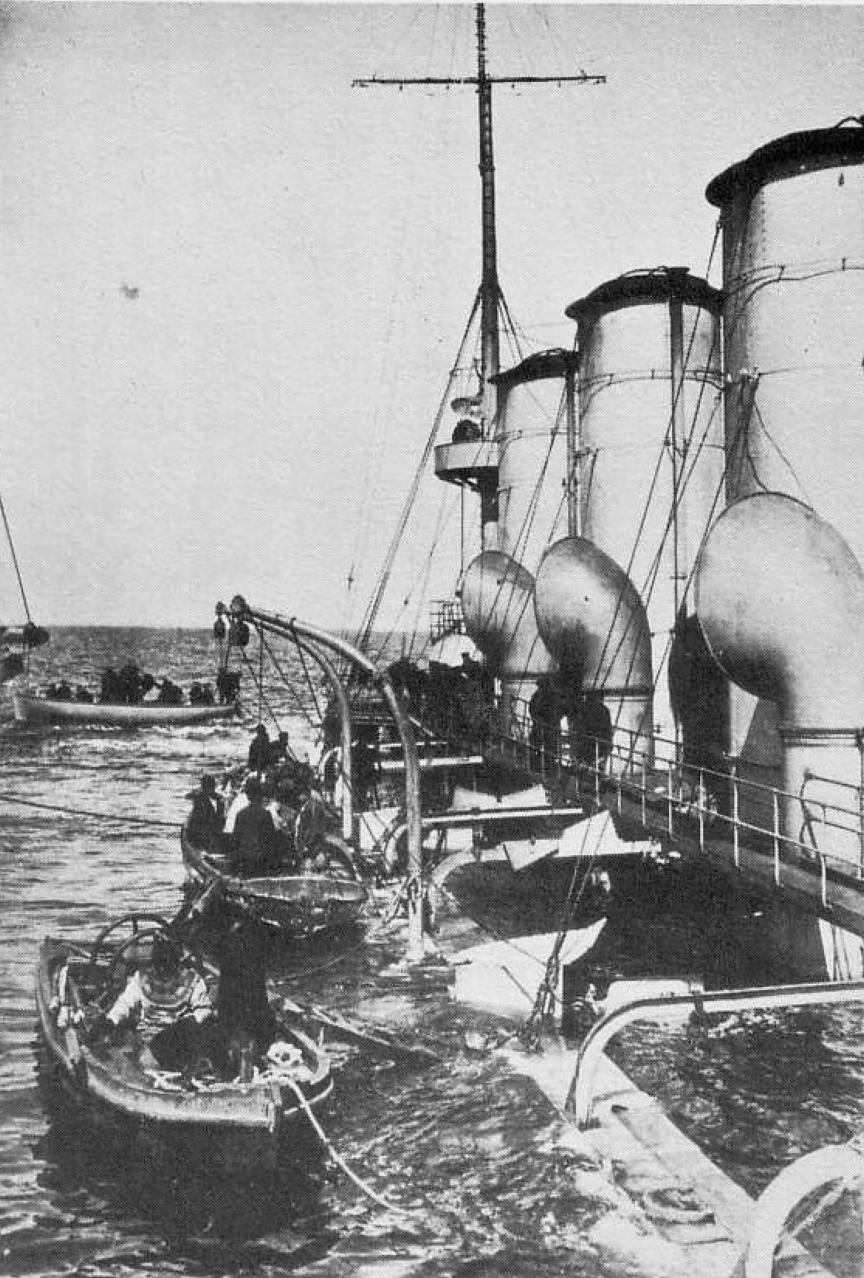
Mecidiye in Odessa, 1915.

During the First World War, Mecidiye operated in the Black Sea.

In December 1914, the ship transported Hafiz Hakki Bey to Trebizond to deliver messages to the 3rd Army's Chief of Staff.

On 3 April 1915, while shelling the port of Odessa, the ship was sunk by hitting a Russian mine 15 nautical miles (28 km; 17 mi) off the coast of Vorokoskiy-Mayak near Odessa in the Russian Empire. 26 crewmen lost their lives.

The ship was raised by the Russians on 31 May 1915, and salvaged on 8 June 1915. It was refitted at the Ropit Yard in Odessa before being commissioned by the Russian Navy with the name Prut (Pruth) on 29 October 1915.

On 1 May 1918 it was captured by the German forces at Sevastopol and was returned to the Ottoman Navy on 13 May 1918, which re-commissioned the ship as Mecidiye.

=== Turkish Navy service, 1927–1947 ===
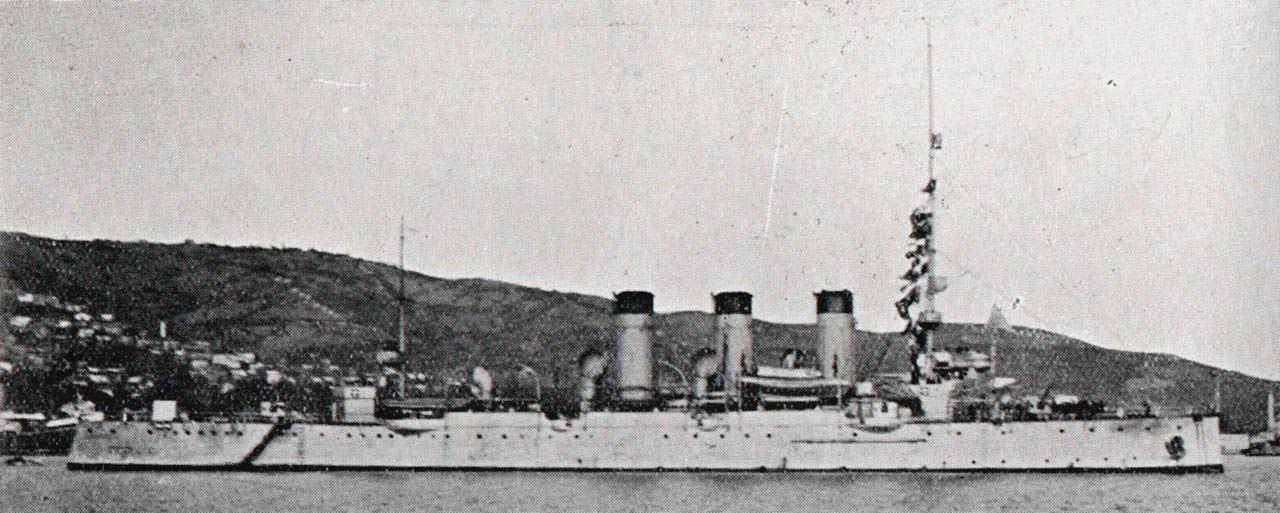
Mecidiye in Istanbul, 1932.

Under the terms of the Treaty of Sèvres in 1920, Ottoman warships were to be handed over to the Allies, in particular the United Kingdom, as war compensation. However, the ensuing Turkish War of Independence culminated in the abrogation of the Treaty of Sèvres; it was replaced by the Treaty of Lausanne in 1923, which permitted the new Turkish Republic to retain the former Ottoman fleet, including Mecidiye. All warships of the former Ottoman Navy which survived World War I (they were interned at the Golden Horn and the Sea of Marmara under Allied control) were transferred to the Turkish Navy in 1925.

After reparation works at the Gölcük Naval Shipyard between 1925 and 1927, Mecidiye was commissioned by the Turkish Navy in June 1927. It was among the large surface combatants of the Turkish Navy between 1927 and 1940, when it became a cadet training ship, being used for this purpose until being decommissioned on 1 March 1947. The ship was sold for scrap in 1952, and broken up between 1952 and 1956.

== Bibliography ==
- Erickson, Edward J., Defeat in detail: the Ottoman Army in the Balkans, 1912–1913, Greenwood Publishing, 2003.
- Erickson, Edward J., Ordered to die: a history of the Ottoman army in the First World War, Greenwood Press, 2001.
- Gardiner, Robert, Randal Gray and Przemyslaw Budzbon, Conway's All the World's Fighting Ships 1906–1921, Naval Institute Press, 1985.
- Sondhaus, Lawrence, Naval warfare, 1815–1914, Routledge, 2001.
