= World War I naval ships of the Ottoman Empire =

A naval race had developed in the Aegean after the end of the Balkan Wars, with the Ottoman government ordering several ships, including two dreadnoughts, in Britain. In the event, with the outbreak of World War I, one of these ships, including further two scout cruisers and four destroyers, were confiscated and pressed into service with the Royal Navy. This disappointed the Ottomans, contributing to their joining the Central Powers in the Great War.

Despite these drawbacks, during World War I the Ottoman Navy saw much action against the Russian, British, and French fleets in the Black Sea, Aegean Sea and the Sea of Marmara.

== The ships of the Ottoman Navy in World War I ==
=== Dreadnoughts ===
The two dreadnoughts, Reşadiye and Sultân Osmân-ı Evvel that had been ordered by the Ottoman government, were never handed over despite the fact that they had both been completed in Britain. Prior to this occurrence, Sultân Osmân-ı Evvel had been constructed by Armstrong Whitworth for the Brazilian Navy in 1911 under the name Rio de Janeiro due to naval rivalries with Argentina. These were eventually resolved in 1913. After the conflict Brazil turned down its order, but the Armstrong Whitworth company did not scrap the ship as it could be sold to other potential customers, among them the Ottoman Empire. In August 1914, the former was transferred to the Royal Navy. She was renamed in the British Fleet as HMS Erin and the latter remained in Ottoman hands until February of 1916 when she was taken in the nighttime as her crew was off the ship, and British ships nearby took her over and renamed her HMS Agincourt.

=== Battle cruisers ===
The German battlecruiser SMS Goeben was transferred to the Ottoman Navy in November 1914 and renamed to Yavûz Sultân Selîm. She was involved from 29 October 1914 till the end of the war in bombarding Russian ports on the Black Sea coast. During the Great War, she was still largely manned and commanded by the German Imperial Navy. She remained in the Turkish Navy after the war, was renamed Yavûz Selîm in 1930 and then Yavûz in 1936, refitted twice soon after this in 1938 and 1941 and scrapped in 1973.

=== Pre-dreadnought battleships ===
The two pre-dreadnought battleships, Barbaros Hayreddin and Turgut Reis, both played a major part in the defense of the Dardanelles during the Gallipoli Campaign. Barbaros Hayreddin was sunk by the British submarine HMS E11 whilst on patrol with two destroyers.

=== Coastal defense ships ===
Mesûdiye, the Ottoman Navy’s only coastal defense ship, was torpedoed and sunk by the British submarine HMS B11, commanded by Lt. Norman Holbrook, on 13 December 1914 off Chanak in the Dardanelles. When the submarine got back to base, Holbrook was awarded the Victoria Cross.

=== Protected cruisers ===
Two Ottoman protected cruisers, Hamidiye and Mecidiye, were both about 10 years old. Mecidiye was sunk in the Black Sea off Odessa while in company with Hamidiye and four torpedo boats from a single Russian mine. She was refloated by the Russians and renamed Prut in June 1915, later being returned to the Ottoman Navy in May 1918 after the Germans captured Ukraine.

=== Light cruisers ===
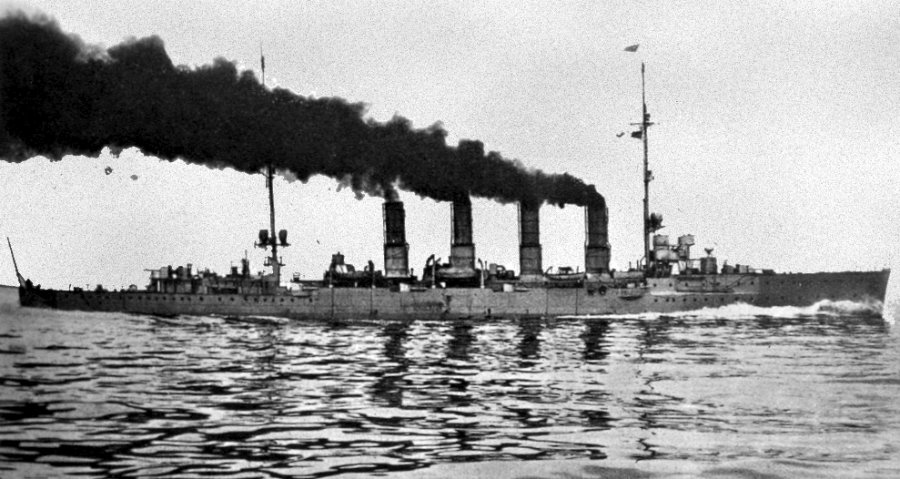
SMS Breslau

The Ottoman Navy acquired during the Great War the light cruiser Midilli (formerly the German SMS Breslau). She served with the SMS Goeben in many raids against Russian shipping and ports from late October 1914. Midilli was sunk in the Aegean Sea on 20 January 1918 whilst with the SMS Goeben by five Allied mines.

=== Destroyers ===
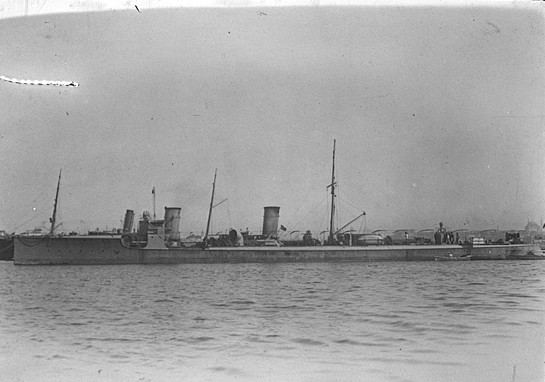
Muâvenet-i Millîye

The Ottoman Navy had eight destroyers - four Samsun class (Basra, Samsun, Taşoz, Yarhisar) and four Muavenet-i Milliye class (known as Schishau class, ex-German S 165 class: Gayret-i Vataniye, Yadigar-i Millet, Muavenet-i Milliye and Nümune-i Hamiyet) ships.

Yarhisar was sunk by the British submarine HMS E11 December 1915, Gayret-i Vataniye ran aground October 1916 and was abandoned, Yâdigâr-ı Millet was bombed by British aircraft July 1917, raised and scrapped.

=== Torpedo boats ===
The Ottoman Navy possessed the old torpedo boat Berk Efşân.

=== Submarines ===
In 1910, the first and thus far only (modern) submarine operated by the Ottoman Navy, Sultan Abdül Hamid (also Sultan Abdülhamid), was scrapped. The Ottoman Empire did not have any submarines going into World War I but obtained one operational submarine during the war. Müstecip Onbaşı, was the former French Turquoise, which ran aground in the Dardanelles on 30 October 1915 and was captured by the Turks. She was returned to France in 1918.

=== Minelayers ===
The Ottoman Navy also had several minelayers, Nusret being the most famous. Her mines laid on 8 March 1915 sank three Allied ships in a small minefield of 20 mines on 18 March 1915. The British pre-dreadnought battleships HMS Irresistible and HMS Ocean and the French battleship Bouvet were all sunk. The British battle cruiser HMS Inflexible was also badly damaged.

=== Armored Gunships ===
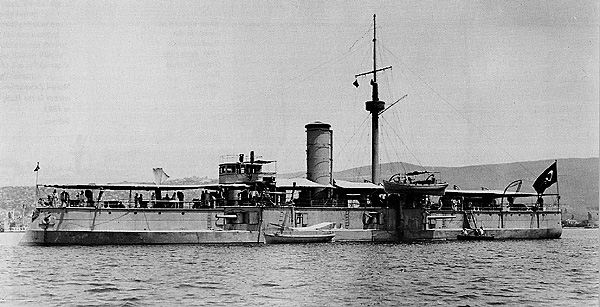
Muin-i Zafer at Salonica in 1911

The ironclad Muîn-i Zafer was built in 1867-71 at Blackwall, one of a group of 7 ships. Rebuilt in 1904-07 by the Italian Naval Shipyards Ansaldo of Genoa, she was of little military value by 1914. A sister unit, the Avnillâh was sunk in Beirut during the Italo-Turkish War.

== Order of Battle, 1914 ==
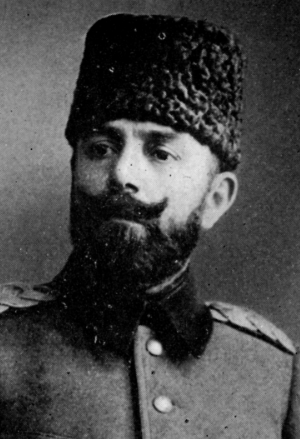
Ottoman Naval Minister (10 March 1914-14 October 1918) Ferik Djemal Pasha (P. 1309).

On October 27, 1914, the main naval ships of the Ottoman Navy was organized as follows:

- Naval Minister: Ferik Djemal Pasha
- Fleet Commander: Admiral Wilhelm Souchon
- Chief of Staff: Admiral Arif

1st Division	2nd Division	1st Destroyer Division	2nd Destroyer Division	1st Torpedo Boat Division	2nd Torpedo Boat Division	Mine Group (Korvet Kaptanı Kasımpaşalı Nazmi Emin)	
Yavûz Sultân Selîm (Kalyon Kaptanı (Note: Kapitän zur See, source: Illustrierte Geschichte des Weltkrieges 1914/15-[1914/19], Teil 7, Union Deutsche Verlagsgesellschaft, 1919, p. 60. (in German)) Richard Ackermann)	Midilli (Fırkateyn Kaptanı (Note: Fregattenkapitän, source: Illustrierte Geschichte des Weltkrieges 1914/15-[1914/19], Teil 7, Union Deutsche Verlagsgesellschaft, 1919, p. 60. (in German)) Paul Kettner)	Nümune-i Hamiyet (out of order)	Samsun (Yzb. Üsküdarlı Nezir Abdullah)	Draç (Yzb. Aziz Mahmud Ali)	Sultanhisar (Yzb. Beşiktaşlı Riza Mehmed)	Yûnus (Yzb. Kasimpaşalı Ahmed Mahmud)	
Barbaros Hayreddin (Kalyon Kaptanı Mustafapaşalı Muzaffer)	Hamidiye (Yzb. Kasımpaşalı Vasif Muhiddin)	Muâvenet-i Millîye (Kalyon Kaptanı Ayasofyalı Ahmed Saffed)	Taşoz (Yzb. Tevfik Halid)	Kütahya (Yzb. Kasimpaşalı Ibrahim Halil)	Demirhisar (Yzb. Istanbullu Ahmed Şefik Hasan)	Nusret (Yzb. Tophaneli Hakki)	
Turgut Reis (Yzb. Sultanselimli Namik Hasan)	TCG Peyk-i Şevket (Kalyon Kaptanı Üsküdarlı Ibrahim Cevat)	Gayret-i Vataniye (Yzb. Kasımpaşalı Cemil Ali)	Basra (out of order)	Mûsul (Yzb. Piyaleli Ahmed Naim Hüsnü)	Sivrihisar (Yzb. Kasımpaşalı Mehmed Sabri)	Intibah (Korvet Kaptanı Ahmed Halid Bekir)	
Mesûdiye (Korvet Kaptanı Beşiktaşlı Arif Nebi)	Berk-i Satvet (Korvet Kaptanı Küçükmustafapaşalı Hamdi)	Yadigar-i Millet (Yzb. Yeniçeşmeli Rauf Said)	Yarhisar (Yzb. Ahmed Hulusi Hasan)	Akhisar (out of order)	Hamidâbad (Yzb. Ibrahim Rıza Kerim)	Nilüfer (Yzb. Cibalili Hasan Murad)	— 1st Division Sultan Osman-ı Evvel
