= Demirhisar-class torpedo boat =

Ottoman torpedo boat class

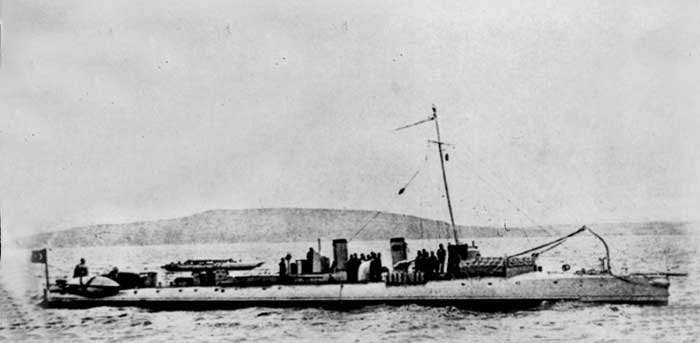
- Sultanhisar in 1915

Class overview
- Name: Demirhisar class
- Builders: Schneider & Cie, Chalon-sur-Saône
- Operators: Ottoman Navy; Turkish Navy
- Built: 1906–1907
- In service: 1907–1918; 1924–1928
- Completed: 4
- Lost: 2
- Scrapped: 2

General characteristics
- Type: Torpedo boat
- Displacement: 97.5 long tons (99.1 t)
- Length: WL: 131 ft 11 in (40.2 m); OA: 124 ft 8 in (38.0 m)
- Beam: 14 ft 5 in (4.4 m)
- Draft: 8 ft 6 in (2.6 m)
- Installed power: 2,000 ihp (1,500 kW)
- Propulsion: 1 × triple-expansion steam engine; 2 × boilers; 1 × propeller
- Speed: 26 knots (48 km/h; 30 mph)
- Complement: 20
- Armament: 2 × 37 mm (1.5 in) guns; 3 × 450 mm (18 in) torpedo tubes

The Demirhisar class was a quartet of torpedo boats built for the Ottoman Navy in 1906. Ordered as part of an effort to modernize the Ottoman fleet, the vessels were identical to French torpedo boats and were built in France. During World War I, two of the ships were lost and another sank an Australian submarine. The remaining two ships were interned following the war and transferred to the Turkish Navy in 1924 and decommissioned four years later.

== Development and design ==
In the early 20th century, Sultan Abdul Hamid II began a modest modernization of the neglected Ottoman Navy following a buildup of the rival Greek Navy. Rather than construct ships for their military capabilities, his government ordered warships from foreign governments as a diplomatic measure to serve as compensation for the destruction of foreign assets during domestic unrest in the 1890s. After a large purchase of artillery from Germany, the Ottomans ordered four torpedo boats from France in 1906 to prevent the impression that the government favored one European power over another. The torpedo boats were the last warships acquired as part of the sultan's efforts.

The four vessels—Hamidabad, Demirhisar, Sivrihisar, and Sultanhisar—were built by Schneider & Cie at Chalon-sur-Saône and were identical to the French Navy's type 38-meter torpedo boats (Torpilleur Type 38 M). In Ottoman service, they were known as the Demirhisar class. The torpedo boats had an overall length of 40.2 metres (131 ft 11 in), length between perpendiculars of 38.0 metres (124 ft 8 in), beam of 4.4 metres (14 ft 5 in), and a draught of 2.6 metres (8 ft 6 in). The boats displaced 97.5 long tons (99.1 t) and carried a complement of 20. Propulsion was provided by a single propeller powered by a triple-expansion steam engine supplied by two coal-powered water-tube boilers, which produced 2,000 indicated horsepower (1,500 kW) for a designed speed of 26 knots (48 km/h; 30 mph). Armament consisted of two 37 mm (1.5 in) Hotchkiss revolving cannons and three 450 mm (18 in) torpedo tubes; one tube was fixed on the bow and two were trainable. A total of 200 shells and five torpedoes were carried onboard.

== Service history ==
All four torpedo boats were ordered on 25 October 1906, laid down that year and commissioned in 1907 at Istanbul. During World War I, the vessels lacked the range to operate with a fleet. Instead, they patrolled for enemy submarines, and in 1916, were equipped with German minesweeping gear to clear a path through the Bosphorus. Due to chronic coal shortages, the ships spent most of the war laid up at İstinye along with other elements of the Ottoman fleet.

After a raid on a British troop transport on 15 April 1915, Demirhisar was pursued by several Royal Navy destroyers. The torpedo boat's engine broke down and she ran aground in Greek territorial waters. Her crew was captured and the ship was boarded, rigged with explosives, and demolished by the British. Fifteen days later in an unrelated engagement, Sultanhisar shelled HMAS AE2 and forced the Australian crew to surrender before their submarine sank. The action was the only time an Ottoman torpedo boat destroyed an enemy submarine during the war, and the only vessel sunk by a member of the class. Two years later on 31 October 1917, Hamidabad was off the coast of İğneada with three minesweepers in tow and gasoline canisters on the deck. She was intercepted by the Russian destroyers Pylkiy and Bystriy; the first shot from the destroyers ignited the gasoline and the torpedo boat was destroyed by the ensuing fire.

Sivrihisar and Sultanhisar were the only members of the class to survive World War I. The two were decommissioned in 1918 and interned in the Gulf of İzmit with other former Ottoman ships in accordance with the Armistice of Mudros. Following the Turkish War of Independence, Turkey was permitted to operate several of the former Ottoman ships in the Treaty of Sèvres, and the torpedo boats were recommissioned into the Turkish Navy in 1924. The Treaty limited the Navy to only six torpedo boats, each armed with only a single 77 mm (3.0 in) gun and no torpedoes. Both Sivrihisar and Sultanhisar were decommissioned again four years later and were broken up in 1935.

== Ships in class ==
Data
Name	Builder	Laid down	Commissioned	Fate
Hamidabad	Schneider & Cie, Chalon-sur-Saône	1906	1907	Sunk 31 October 1917
Demirhisar	Schneider & Cie, Chalon-sur-Saône	1906	1907	Ran aground on 16 April 1915 and demolished
Sivrihisar	Schneider & Cie, Chalon-sur-Saône	1906	1907	Decommissioned in 1928, broken up in 1935
Sultanhisar	Schneider & Cie, Chalon-sur-Saône	1906	1907	Decommissioned in 1928, broken up in 1935
