= Ottoman torpedo boat Hamidabad =

Ottoman torpedo boat

History

Ottoman Empire
- Name: Hamidabad
- Owner: Ottoman Navy
- Ordered: 25 October 1906
- Builder: Schneider & Cie in Chalon-sur-Saône, France
- Laid down: 1906
- Launched: 1907
- Commissioned: 1907
- Fate: Sunk, 1917

General characteristics
- Type: Torpedo boat
- Displacement: 97.5 long tons (99.1 t)
- Length: WL: 131 ft 11 in (40.2 m); OA: 124 ft 8 in (38.0 m)
- Beam: 14 ft 5 in (4.4 m)
- Draft: 8 ft 6 in (2.6 m)
- Installed power: 2,000 ihp (1,500 kW)
- Propulsion: 1 × triple-expansion steam engine; 2 × boilers; 1 × propeller
- Speed: 26 knots (48 km/h; 30 mph)
- Complement: 20
- Armament: 2 × 37 mm (1.5 in) guns; 3 × 450 mm (18 in) torpedo tubes

Hamidabad (also written as Hâmidabad) was a Demirhisar-class torpedo boat of the Ottoman Navy. Ordered in 1906 as the last part of a modernization effort, her design was identical to French torpedo boats. During the First Balkan War, she was primarily used to defend the Bosporus and saw little action. During World War I, she was used to clear naval mines and was unable to operate at sea with a fleet. While escorting three minesweepers in the Black Sea on 31 October 1917, she was intercepted by two Russian destroyers and sunk.

== Development and design ==
In the early 20th century, Sultan Abdul Hamid II began a modest modernization of the neglected Ottoman Navy following a buildup of the rival Greek Navy. Rather than construct ships for their military capabilities, his government ordered warships from foreign governments as a diplomatic measure to serve as compensation for the destruction of foreign assets during domestic unrest in the 1890s. After a large purchase of artillery from Germany, the Ottomans ordered four torpedo boats from France in 1906 to prevent the impression that the government favored one European power over another. The torpedo boats were the last warships acquired as part of the sultan's efforts.

The four vessels, known as the Demirhisar-class torpedo boats, were built by Schneider & Cie at Chalon-sur-Saône and were identical to the French Navy's type 38-meter torpedo boats (Torpilleur Type 38 M). In Ottoman service, they were known as the Demirhisar class. The torpedo boats had an overall length of 40.2 metres (131 ft 11 in), length between perpendiculars of 38.0 metres (124 ft 8 in), beam of 4.4 metres (14 ft 5 in), and a draught of 2.6 metres (8 ft 6 in). The boats displaced 97.5 long tons (99.1 t) and carried a complement of 20. Propulsion was provided by a single propeller powered by a triple-expansion steam engine supplied by two coal-powered water-tube boilers, which produced 2,000 indicated horsepower (1,500 kW) for a designed speed of 26 knots (48 km/h; 30 mph). Armament consisted of two 37 mm (1.5 in) Hotchkiss revolving cannons and three 450 mm (18 in) torpedo tubes; one tube was fixed on the bow and two were trainable. A total of 200 shells and five torpedoes were carried onboard.

== Service history ==
All four torpedo boats were ordered on 25 October 1906, laid down that year and commissioned in 1907 at Istanbul. By the First Balkan War, Hamidabad was in service but inferior to her European counterparts due to chronic maintenance issues throughout the fleet. While naval combat was expected, no work was done to repair the ships. Instead, the Navy made the ships look as if they were maintained and prepared and assigned them to defend the Bosporus. Hamidabad, along with the ironclad Mesudiye and torpedo boat Kütahya, anchored off Büyükdere near the Black Sea to serve as guardships in October 1912. Hamidabad was reassigned to a task force that set sail on 22 February 1913, intended to draw Greek ships away from Mesudiye as the ironclad intercepted a Bulgarian convoy. The sortie ended without an engagement, and the Ottoman escorts turned back. For the next two months, the torpedo boat patrolled the Bosporus and avoided engagements with any Greek ships.

By World War I, the Demirhisar class lacked the range to operate with the Ottoman fleet at sea. Instead, the ships–along with older gunboats, torpedo boats, and destroyers–were equipped with minesweeping gear and used to clear a passage through the Bosporus and allow for crucial coal shipments to get through by late September 1916. The Russian Navy aimed to use destroyers to disrupt Turkish coal supplies, and in late October 1917, the Ottomans believed the critical route between the Bosporus and Constanța was again mined. As a result, Hamidabad was dispatched with three German minesweepers in tow to clear a path. Gasoline for the minesweepers were stacked on the torpedo boat's deck. Due to Russian intelligence, the group was intercepted by Russian destroyers Pylkiy and Bystriy while anchored off İğneada in the early morning of 31 October 1917. The second Russian salvo ignites the gasoline on Hamidabad's deck, and she soon sink with eight crew members killed and a further six wounded. Shore artillery was unable to hit the destroyers as the minesweepers and two other steamships are driven ashore, which were all later recovered.
