= Ottoman ironclad Asar-i Tevfik =

Ironclad warship of the Ottoman Navy

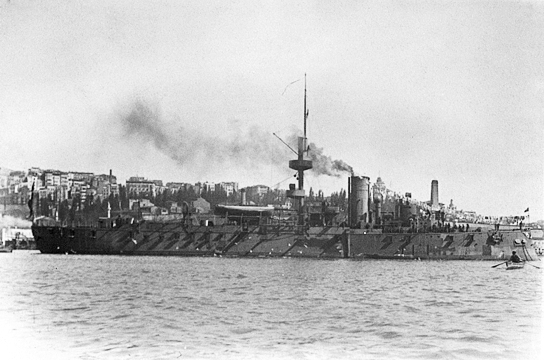
- Asar-i Tevfik after her reconstruction

Class overview
- Name: Asar-i Tevfik class
- Operators: Ottoman Navy
- Preceded by: Osmaniye class
- Succeeded by: Asar-i Şevket class

History
- Name: Asar-i Tevfik
- Ordered: 1865
- Builder: FCM, La Seyne
- Laid down: 1867
- Launched: 1868
- Acquired: 29 August 1868
- Commissioned: 1870
- Fate: Wrecked off Çernes, 11 February 1913

General characteristics
- Type: ironclad warship
- Displacement: 4,687 t (4,613 long tons; 5,167 short tons)
- Length: 83.01 m (272 ft 4 in)
- Beam: 16 m (52 ft 6 in)
- Draft: 6.5 m (21 ft 4 in)
- Installed power: 3,560 ihp (2,650 kW); 6 × box boilers
- Propulsion: 1 × compound steam engine; 1 × screw propeller
- Speed: 13 kn (24 km/h; 15 mph)
- Complement: 320
- Armament: As built: 8 × 220 mm (9 in) guns; 1906: 3 × 150 mm (5.9 in) guns; 7 × 120 mm (4.7 in) guns; 6 × 57 mm (2.2 in) guns; 2 × 37 mm (1.5 in) guns

Asar-i Tevfik (Ottoman Turkish: God's Favor) was an ironclad warship of the Ottoman Navy built in the 1860s, the only member of her class. She was built as part of a major expansion program for the Ottoman fleet in the 1860s following the Crimean War. Asar-i Tevfik was a 4,600-metric-ton (4,500-long-ton; 5,100-short-ton) barbette ship armed with a main battery of eight 220-millimeter (8.7 in) guns in a central battery. In 1903–1906, the ship was extensively rebuilt in Germany and a new battery of 150 mm (5.9 in) and 120 mm (4.7 in) quick-firing guns replaced the older weapons.

Asar-i Tevfik served in the Ottoman fleet for more than four decades. During this period, she saw action in two major wars, the Russo-Turkish War of 1877–1878 and the First Balkan War in 1913. During the first conflict, she was torpedoed by a Russian torpedo boat but was only slightly damaged. She took part in the abortive Battle of Elli against the Greek Navy in December 1912 during the First Balkan War. While operating against Bulgarian positions in February 1913, she ran aground; Bulgarian field artillery then shelled the ship. The damage they inflicted, coupled with heavy seas, destroyed the ship.

== Design ==
In the aftermath of the Crimean War, where an entire Ottoman squadron was destroyed by a Russian fleet at the Battle of Sinop, the Ottoman Empire began a small naval construction program, limited primarily by the chronically weak Ottoman economy. The design for Asar-i Tevfik was based on contemporary French warships like the Colbert-class ironclads, although significantly reduced in size. The designers adopted a two-story arrangement of the main battery, which allowed for a shorter hull and in turn provided for a more maneuverable vessel.

=== General characteristics ===
Asar-i Tevfik was 83.01 meters (272 ft 4 in) long between perpendiculars and she had a beam of 16 m (52 ft 6 in) and a draft of 6.5 m (21 ft 4 in). She displaced 4,687 metric tons (4,613 long tons; 5,167 short tons) normally. The ship had an iron hull with a partial double bottom and a ram bow, as was customary for ironclads of the period. She had a crew of 320 officers and enlisted men. In 1903–1906, the ship was substantially rebuilt. Both ends were cut down, a single military mast was installed amidships, and a new conning tower was built.

The ship was powered by a single horizontal compound steam engine that drove one screw propeller. Steam was provided by six box boilers, which were trunked into a single funnel amidships. The engines and boilers were both manufactured by her builder at the La Seyne shipyard. The engines were rated at 3,560 indicated horsepower (2,650 kW) for a top speed of 13 knots (24 km/h; 15 mph), though by 1895 poor maintenance over her career had reduced her top speed to 8 knots (15 km/h; 9.2 mph). The steam engine was supplemented by a barque sailing rig. During the reconstruction, the sailing rig was removed and the old boilers were replaced with newer Niclausse boilers. She also received a new engine, the performance of which is unknown.

=== Armament and armor ===
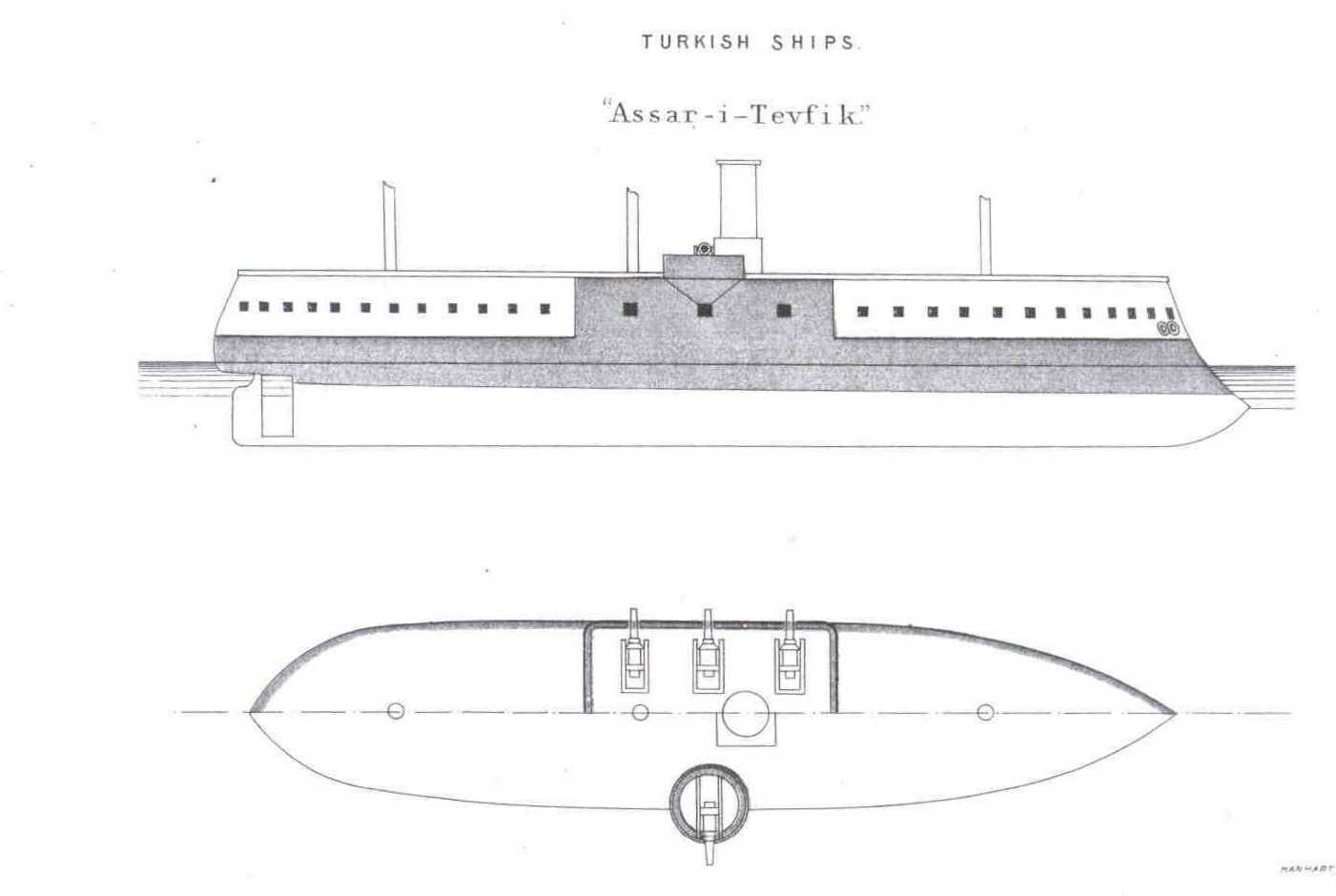
Line-drawing of Asar-i Tevfik's original configuration; the shaded area represents the portions protected by armor

Asar-i Tevfik was armed with a main battery of eight 220-millimeter (8.7 in) muzzle-loading guns manufactured by Armstrong Whitworth. Six of the guns were mounted in an armored battery amidships, with three on each broadside, and the other two were placed directly above in open barbettes. In 1891, the two barbette guns were replaced with 210 mm (8.3 in) breech-loading guns built by Krupp, and several smaller Krupp guns were installed. These included a pair of 87 mm (3.4 in) guns and a pair of 63.5 mm (2.5 in) guns. Two 25.4 mm (1 in) Nordenfelt guns were also added.

The ship's armament was radically revised during the 1903–1906 reconstruction. All of the old guns were removed and a battery of medium-caliber quick-firing (QF) guns manufactured by Krupp was installed. Three 150 mm (5.9 in) SK L/40 guns in single shielded mounts were placed forward, with one on the forecastle and the other two abreast of the conning tower. The central battery guns were replaced with six 120 mm (4.7 in) SK L/40 guns, with a seventh gun mounted on the stern. Six 57 mm (2.2 in) and two 37 mm (1.5 in) QF guns were also added.

As built, the ship was protected with an iron armored belt that was 200 mm (8 in) thick. The transverse bulkheads that connected both ends of the belt were 75 mm (3 in) thick. The central battery had thinner iron plating than the belt, at 150 mm (6 in), and the barbette guns were protected with 130 mm (5 in) of iron. The reconstruction added a 75 mm armored deck, and the new conning tower was protected with 150 mm thick armor plating.

== Service history ==
Asar-i Tevfik, meaning "God's Favor, was ordered in 1865 by the government of Egypt as Ibrahimiye and laid down two years later at the French Société Nouvelle des Forges et Chantiers de la Méditerranée shipyard in La Seyne. The ship was launched in 1868 and completed by 1869 for sea trials. In the meantime, Egypt had transitioned from a state directly ruled by the Ottoman government to the autonomous Khedivate of Egypt, and on 29 August 1868 the Khedivate transferred the ship to the Ottoman Navy. She was commissioned as Asar-i Tevfik in 1870. Upon completion, Asar-i Tevfik and the other ironclads then being built in Britain and France were sent to Crete to assist in stabilizing the island in the aftermath of the Cretan Revolt of 1866–1869. During this period, the Ottoman fleet, under Hobart Pasha, remained largely inactive, with training confined to reading translated British instruction manuals. Early in the ship's career, the Ottoman ironclad fleet was activated every summer for short cruises from the Golden Horn to the Bosporus to ensure their propulsion systems were in operable condition.

=== Russo-Turkish War ===
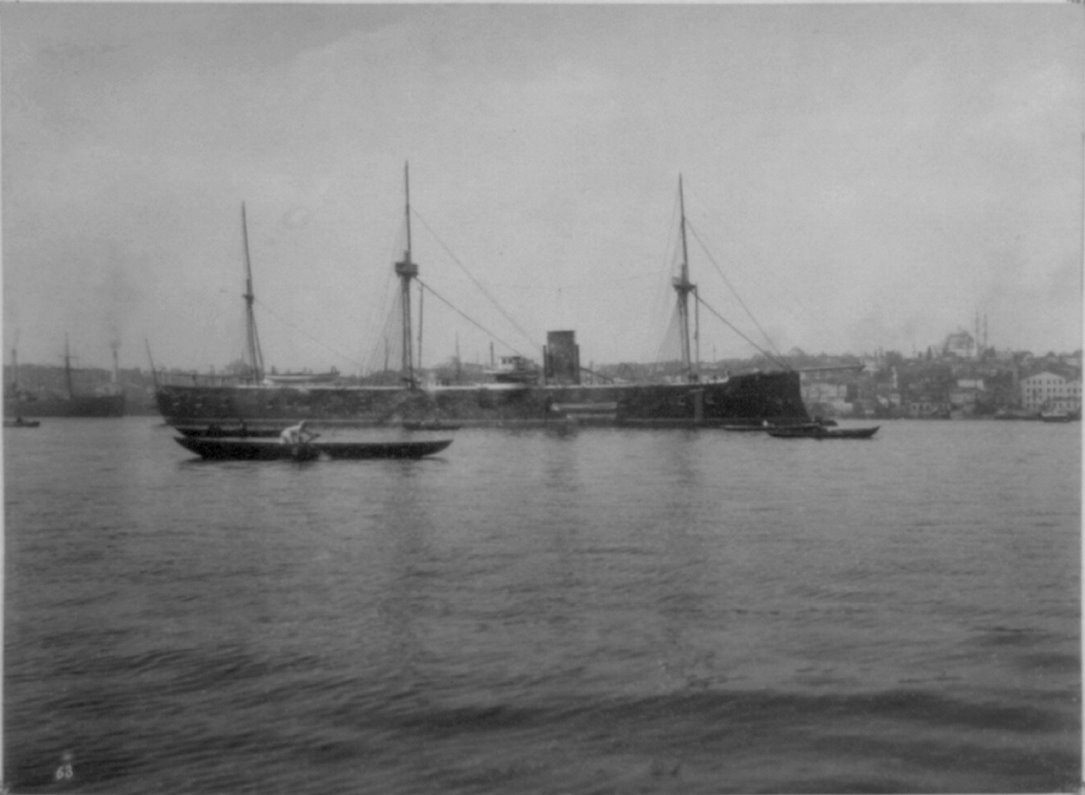
Asar-i Tevfik as originally built

The ship saw action during the Russo-Turkish War of 1877–1888. She spent the war in the Black Sea squadron. The Ottoman fleet, commanded by Hobart Pasha, was vastly superior to the Russian Black Sea Fleet; the only ironclads the Russians possessed there were Vitse-admiral Popov and Novgorod, circular vessels that had proved to be useless in service. The presence of the fleet did force the Russians to keep two corps in reserve for coastal defense, but the Ottoman high command failed to make use of its naval superiority in a more meaningful way, particularly to hinder the Russian advance into the Balkans. Hobart Pasha took the fleet to the western Black Sea, where he was able to make a more aggressive use of it to support the Ottoman forces battling the Russians in the Caucasus. The fleet bombarded Poti and assisted in the defense of Batumi.

In June, the Russian Baltic Fleet began a campaign to neutralize the Ottoman ironclads using torpedo boats equipped with towed and spar torpedoes. On the night of 23–24 August 1877, three Russian torpedo boats, Miner, Navarin, and Sinop, attempted to sink the ship with spar torpedoes while she was moored in Sukhumi. Gunfire from the Ottoman ships, along with troops on the shore, made the Russian attack difficult. Sinop detonated her torpedo against a boat that was protecting Asar-i Tevfik, causing only minor damage to the ironclad, though the Russians initially believed they had sunk her. The ship was able to steam to Batumi, where she was repaired. The attackers had been aided by a fire burning on the beach, which illuminated the Ottoman vessels in the harbor. The Ottoman fleet continued to support the Ottoman garrison at Batumi, when held out against constant Russian attacks to the end of the war.

After the end of the war, the ship was laid up in 1878 at Constantinople, the Ottoman capital. The annual summer cruises to the Bosporus ended. By the mid-1880s, the Ottoman ironclad fleet was in poor condition, and Asar-i Tevfik was the only ironclad still able to go to sea. Throughout this period, the ship's crew was limited to about one-third the normal figure. During a period of tension with Greece in 1886, the fleet was brought to full crews and the ships were prepared to go to sea, but none actually left the Golden Horn, and they were quickly laid up again. By that time, most of the ships were capable of little more than 4 to 6 knots (7.4 to 11.1 km/h; 4.6 to 6.9 mph).

=== Modernization ===
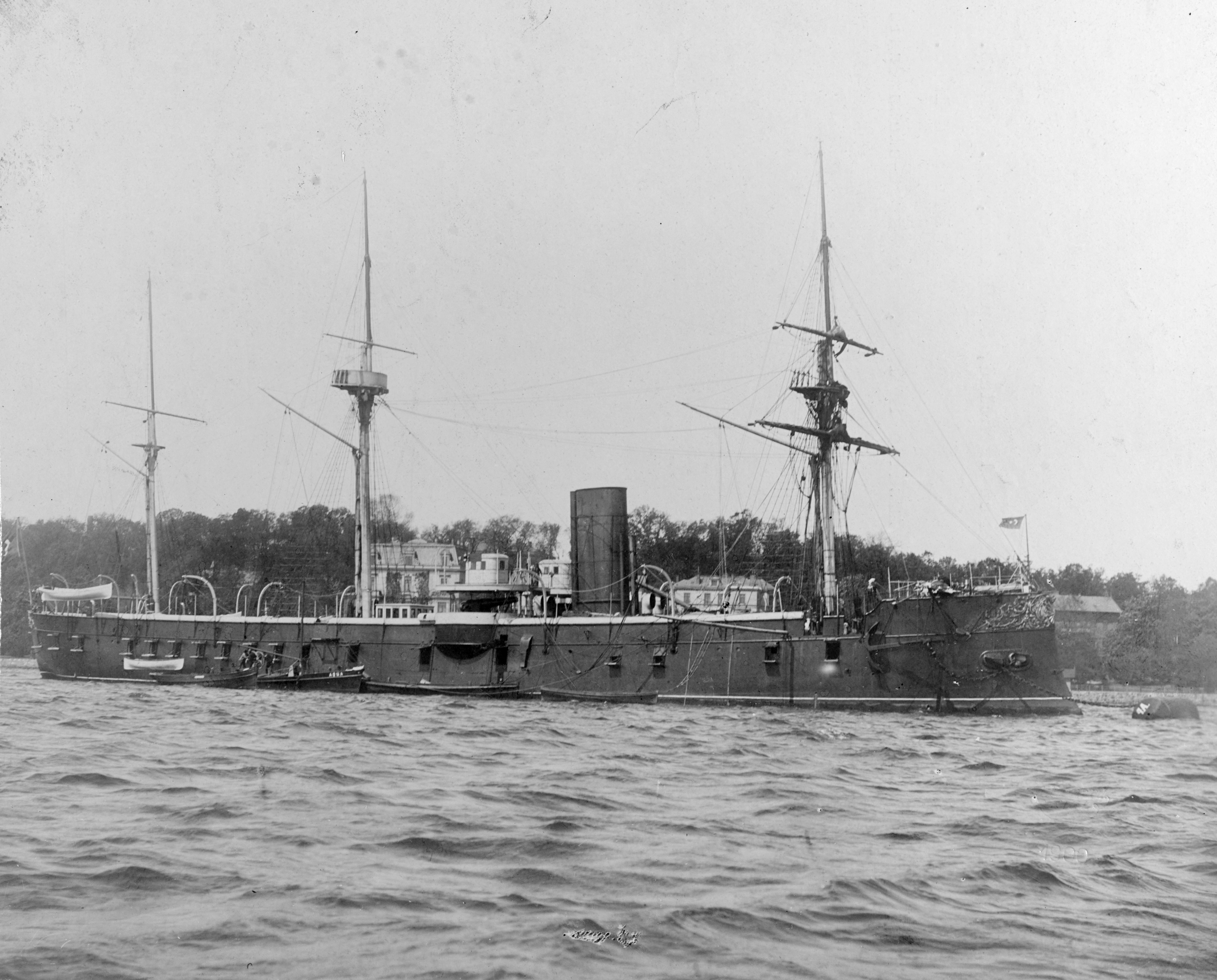
Asar-i Tevfik photographed in Kiel, in 1900

From 1890 to 1892, the ship was re-boilered at the Imperial Arsenal on the Golden Horn. In 1892, Asar-i Tevfik and the ironclad Feth-i Bülend were ordered to reinforce the Cretan Squadron during a period of unrest on the island, but neither vessel was capable of going to sea, owing to leaky boiler tubes. Following the Greco-Turkish War in 1897, which highlighted the seriously degraded state of the Ottoman fleet, the government decided to begin a naval reconstruction program. The first stage was to rebuild the older armored warships, including Asar-i Tevfik. Requests for proposals were sent to foreign shipyards, and in October 1898 the Gio. Ansaldo & C. shipyard in Genoa requested permission to survey the ship and the ironclad Mesudiye. Both vessels were accordingly sent to Genoa in January 1899, arriving on the 28th. There she was briefly laid up. Instead, Asar-i Tevfik was transferred to the Germaniawerft shipyard in Kiel, Germany for a major reconstruction, arriving on 29 May 1900, with the transport İzmir.

After docking in Kiel, the men from Asar-i Tevfik were transferred to İzmir, but with no funds to buy coal, the men were stranded in Germany. Germaniawerft stripped down Asar-i Tevfik, but then halted work to await the first Ottoman payment. By mid-1901, the men had accumulated significant debt and the Ottoman government had made no effort to return them or pay the installments for the modernization program. Even Kaiser Wilhelm II became involved in an attempt to press the Ottoman government to settle the debts incurred by the sailors. Instead, the Ottomans demanded that Krupp, the owner of the Germaniawerft shipyard, make an advance of 6,000 lira so that İzmir could be prepared for the voyage back to Constantinople. The Ottomans were at the time negotiating for a large armament contract with Krupp for the Army, and used this as leverage; by late 1901, Krupp conceded, rather than risk the lucrative contract. The debts in Kiel were paid and İzmir finally departed for home.

No work was done to the ship over the following two years. On 18 January 1904, Ottoman negotiators began a new round of talks with Krupp, demanding a reduction in the cost of the modernization from 282,000 lira to 65,000 lira; this amount did not cover the preparatory work that had been initially carried out, let alone the reconstruction. In return, the Ottoman government would order a pair of torpedo cruisers—the Peyk-i Şevket class—from Germaniawerft. With the armament contract still under negotiation, Krupp was forced to concede, despite the significant financial loss the reconstruction deal represented. By April, the armament contract was signed, and so work began slowly on Asar-i Tevfik. Work was completed by late 1906. The reconstructed ship departed Kiel on 19 November, and arrived in Constantinople on 4 January 1907

In 1909, she participated in the first fleet maneuver conducted by the Ottoman Navy in twenty years. During the Italo-Turkish War of 1911–1912, Asar-i Tevfik was assigned to the Reserve Division, along with Mesudiye and the torpedo cruiser Berk-i Satvet. She did not see action during the conflict, since the bulk of the Ottoman fleet spent the war in port. This was in part due to the rising tensions in the Balkans that presaged the Balkan Wars; the Ottomans kept their fleet in port so it could be prepared for the inevitable conflict.

=== First Balkan War ===
The ship saw significant service during the First Balkan War of 1912–1913. At the start of the war, Asar-i Tevfik was suffering from boiler trouble, which necessitated repairs that lasted until 9 November. She was then sent to support the Ottoman troops defending the Çatalca Line against Bulgarian troops. She took up a position off Tekirdağ to provide gunfire support. After the Bulgarians occupied the town, she bombarded their positions, but the attack had little effect. The ship was then moved to Büyükçekmece, where she joined the rest of the fleet. They had no contact with Bulgarian forces during this period.

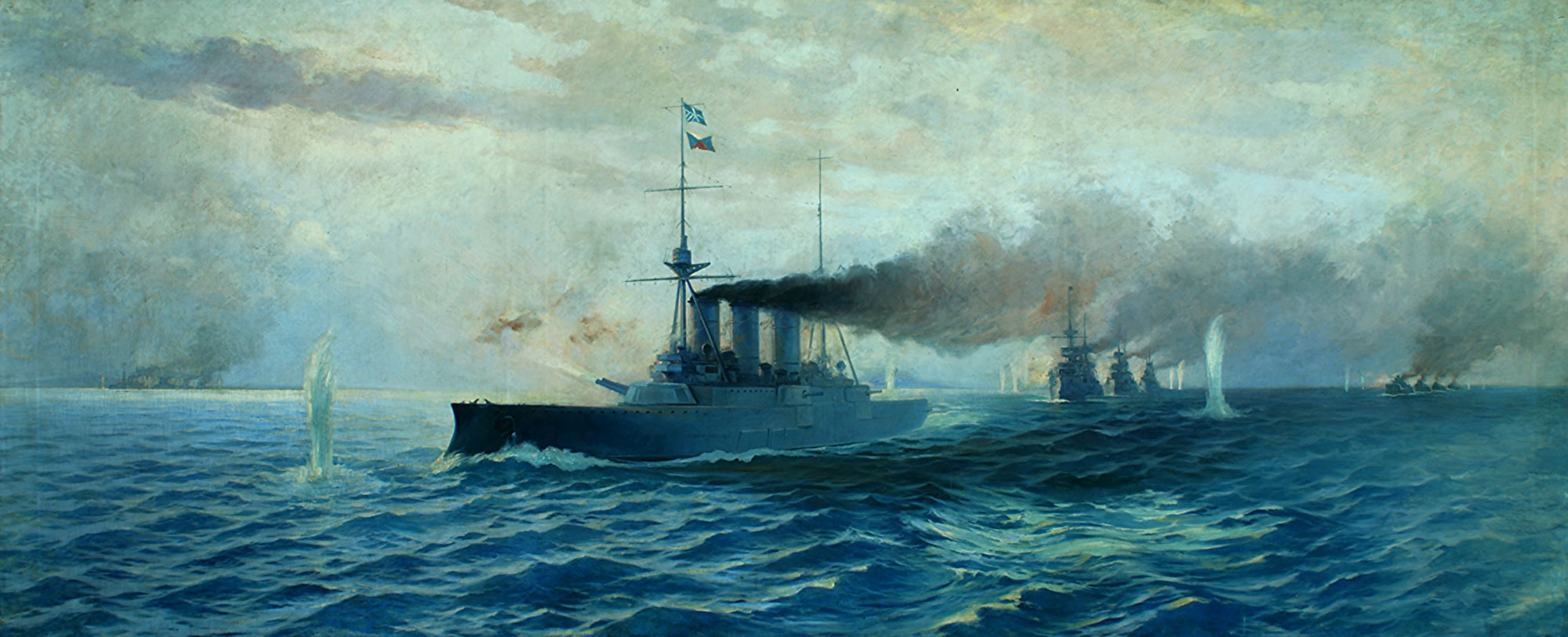
Painting depicting the Greek fleet during the Battle of Elli

She took part in the Battle of Elli, the first Ottoman surface action involving major warships since the Russo-Turkish War, on 16 December 1912. Asar-i Tevfik joined a fleet consisting of the pre-dreadnought battleships Barbaros Hayreddin and Turgut Reis, Mesudiye, and several smaller warships. The Ottoman fleet sortied from the Dardanelles at 9:30; the smaller craft remained at the mouth of the straits while the battleships sailed north, hugging the coast. The Greek flotilla, which included the armored cruiser Georgios Averof and three Hydra-class ironclads, sailing from the island of Lemnos, altered course to the northeast to block the advance of the Ottoman battleships.

The Ottoman ships opened fire on the Greeks at 9:40, from a range of about 15,000 yd (14,000 m). Five minutes later, Georgios Averof crossed over to the other side of the Ottoman fleet, placing the Ottomans in the unfavorable position of being under fire from both sides. At 9:50 and under heavy pressure from the Greek fleet, the Ottoman ships completed a 16-point turn, which reversed their course, and headed for the safety of the straits. The turn was poorly conducted, and the ships fell out of formation, blocking each other's fields of fire. By 10:17, both sides had ceased firing and the Ottoman fleet withdrew into the Dardanelles. When they approached the straits, Asar-i Tevfik and Mesudiye took up positions to cover the withdrawal of the damaged pre-dreadnoughts. The ships reached port by 13:00 and transferred their casualties to the hospital ship Resit Paşa. Asar-i Tevfik had not been hit in the engagement. The battle was considered a Greek victory, because the Ottoman fleet remained blockaded.

On 10 January 1913, Asar-i Tevfik supported another sortie by the fleet, this time patrolling off the Dardanelles while the rest of the fleet raided Imbros. While protecting the fleet's flank, she encountered Greek destroyers and forced them to withdraw after firing a few shots. Neither side scored any hits in the engagement. The ship was lost while operating in the Black Sea against Bulgarian forces. On 7 February, the ship was ordered to proceed to Yalıköy, Çatalca to support a raid by the Army. The following day, the raid was launched on the town, but was quickly forced to withdraw from heavy Bulgarian resistance; Asar-i Tevfik was ordered to move in and shell the town, but ran aground on an uncharted sandbank at 12:45. On 10 February, salvage work began, beginning with the removal of equipment. By the 12th, all armament and coal had been removed, but the ship could not be freed. Heavy seas and Bulgarian artillery damaged the wreck, which rendered her a total loss.
