= Peyk-i Şevket-class cruiser =

Torpedo cruiser class of the Ottoman Navy

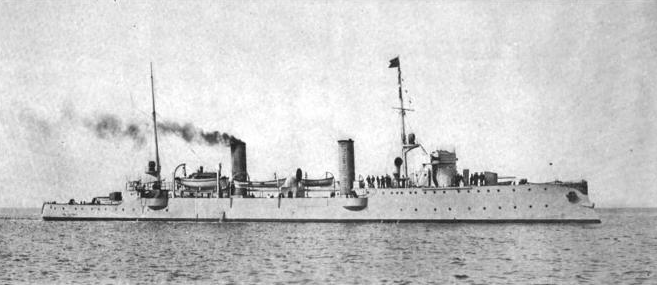
- One of the two Peyk-i Şevket-class cruisers in their original configuration

Class overview
- Built: 1906–1907
- In commission: 1907–1944
- Completed: 2
- Scrapped: 2

General characteristics
- Type: Torpedo cruiser
- Displacement: 775 long tons (787 t)
- Length: 80.1 m (262 ft 10 in)
- Beam: 8.4 m (27 ft 7 in)
- Draft: 4.6 m (15 ft 1 in)
- Installed power: 4 × water-tube boilers; 5,100 ihp (3,800 kW)
- Propulsion: 2 × triple-expansion steam engines; 2 × screw propellers
- Speed: 21 knots (39 km/h; 24 mph)
- Range: 3,240 nmi (6,000 km; 3,730 mi)
- Complement: 105
- Armament: 2 × 105 mm (4.1 in) guns; 6 × 57 mm (2.2 in) guns; 2 × 37 mm (1.5 in) guns; 3 × 450 mm (17.7 in) torpedo tubes

The Peyk-i Şevket class was a pair of torpedo cruisers built for the Ottoman Navy by the German shipyard Germaniawerft in 1906–1907. The class comprised two ships: Peyk-i Şevket and Berk-i Satvet. They were ordered as part of a program to modernize the Ottoman fleet at the turn of the century. The ships were small vessels, at only 775 metric tons (763 long tons; 854 short tons); they were nevertheless heavily armed for their size, with three torpedo tubes and a pair of 105 mm (4.1 in) guns along with several smaller weapons.

Neither ship saw action during the Italo-Turkish War of 1911–1912, as Peyk-i Şevket had been interned in Suez and Berk-i Satvet spent the war confined to the Sea of Marmara with the main Ottoman fleet. Both ships took a more active role in the Balkan Wars, frequently providing gunfire to support to Ottoman troops in East Thrace. During World War I, both ships served in the Black Sea, where they conducted patrols, escorted convoys, and attacked Russian ports. In January 1915, Berk-i Satvet was mined off the Bosporus, and seven months later, Peyk-i Şevket was torpedoed by the British submarine HMS E11 in the Sea of Marmara. Both ships were repaired and returned to service by 1918.

After the end of the war, both ships were kept in service with the new Turkish Navy, with lengthy overhauls in the mid-1920s. Both ships were extensively modernized in the late 1930s, and they remained in service to 1944, when they were finally decommissioned. Both vessels were ultimately broken up in the early 1950s.

== Design ==
The Peyk-i Şevket class was classified as a torpedo cruiser by the Ottoman Navy, but was also sometimes referred to as a torpedo gunboat. The two ships were authorized in 1903, and were ordered from the Krupp-owned Germaniawerft shipyard in Germany, as part of a deal to modernize the elderly ironclad Âsâr-ı Tevfik. The two cruisers were part of a naval reconstruction program that began in the late 1890s, following the Greco-Turkish War of 1897, in which the Ottoman fleet had been unable to play an active role.

=== Characteristics ===
The ships were 80.1 m (262 ft 10 in) long, with a beam of 8.4 m (27 ft 7 in) and a draft of 4.6 m (15 ft 1 in). They displaced 775 long tons (787 t) while on sea trials. By 1938, their displacement had increased to 850 long tons (860 t). The ships were fitted with two pole masts, the foremast just aft of the conning tower and the main mast further aft. The forecastle deck extended to the base of the forward funnel, and the quarterdeck was stepped down aft of the mainmast. They were steel-hulled ships and carried no armor protection. Their crew numbered 125 officers and enlisted men as completed, and it had risen to 145 by 1915.

The ships were powered by a pair of vertical triple-expansion engines each driving a screw propeller. Their four coal-fired Schulz water-tube boilers, manufactured by Germaniawerft, were trunked into two funnels. The engines were rated at 5,100 indicated horsepower (3,800 kW) for a top speed of 21 knots (39 km/h; 24 mph), though on trials they reached 22 kn (41 km/h; 25 mph). By 1915, poor maintenance and heavy use had reduced their speed to 18 kn (33 km/h; 21 mph). The Peyk-i Şevket-class ships had storage capacity for 244 t (240 long tons; 269 short tons) of coal, which provided a cruising radius of 3,240 nautical miles (6,000 km; 3,730 mi).

The two Peyk-i Şevket-class cruisers' primary offensive armament was their three 450 mm (17.7 in) torpedo tubes. One was mounted in the bow, above water, and the other two were in deck-mounted swivel launchers amidships. They were armed with a pair of 105 mm (4.1 in) quick-firing 40-caliber guns that were placed in shielded single mounts on the forecastle and quarterdeck. For close-range defense against torpedo boats, they also carried six 57 mm (2.2 in) 40-caliber guns, four of which were mounted in sponsons, a pair of 37 mm (1.5 in) guns, and two machine guns.

=== Modifications ===
Both ships were rebuilt in the late 1930s and incorporated substantial improvements. Both stem and stern were rebuilt, with a new raked bow. Their superstructure was also reconstructed. The old gun armament was replaced with a pair of 88 mm (3.5 in) 45-caliber guns and four 37 mm 40-caliber guns, and Berk-i Satvet received equipment to handle 25 naval mines.

== Ships ==
Name	Builder	Laid down	Launched	Commissioned	Decommissioned	Fate
Peyk-i Şevket	Germaniawerft	February 1906	15 November 1906	November 1907	1944	Broken up for scrap, 1953–1955
Berk-i Satvet	Germaniawerft	February 1906	1 December 1906	November 1907	1944	Broken up for scrap, 1953–1955

== Service history ==
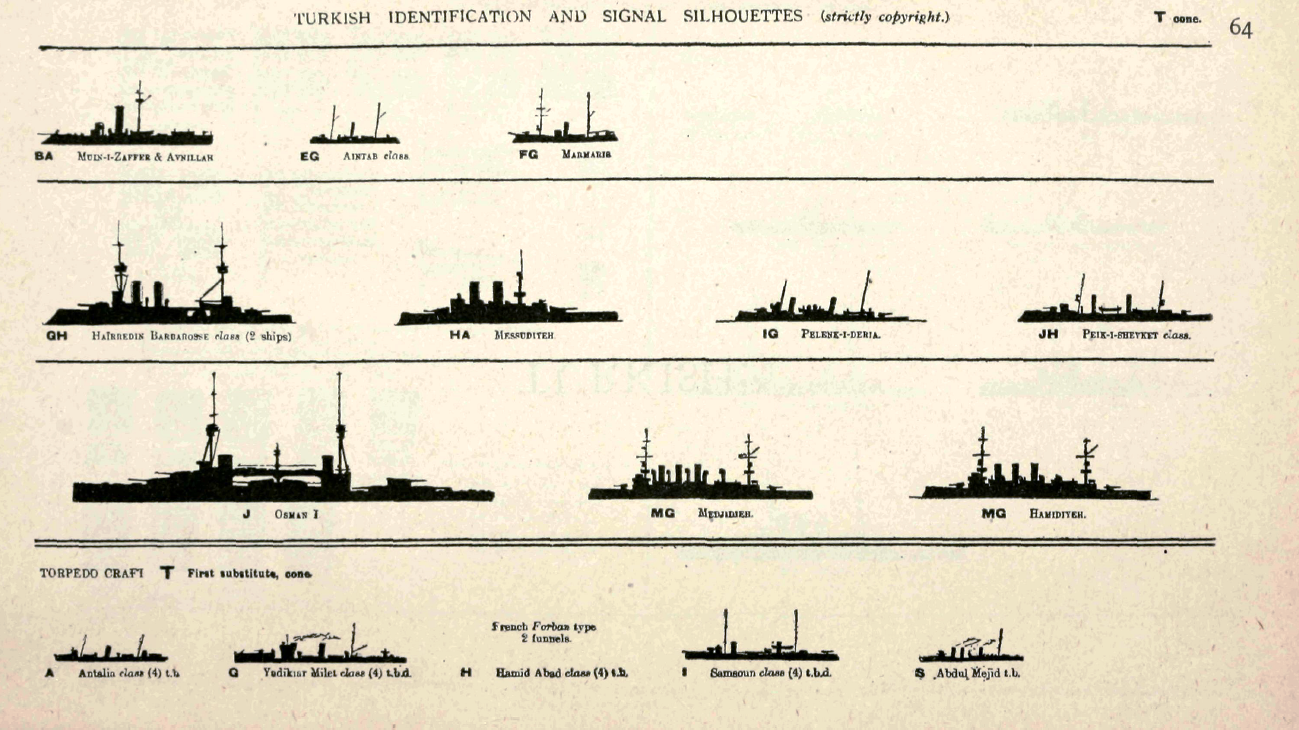
Silhouettes of the major warships of the Ottoman Navy in 1914; the Peyk-i Şevket-class is the fourth ship in the second row

Both ships saw extensive service with the Ottoman fleet over the course of the decade following their arrival in November 1907. They took part in the first fleet maneuver conducted by the fleet in over twenty years in 1909. Neither ship saw action during the Italo-Turkish War of 1911–1912, as Peyk-i Şevket had been interned at British-controlled Suez at the outbreak of war, and Berk-i Satvet was stationed with the reserve fleet in the Sea of Marmara, which did not risk confrontation with the significantly stronger Italian fleet. Both ships saw combat during the First Balkan War in 1913, primarily in supporting Ottoman forces ashore in East Thrace. The ships provided gunfire support to the Ottoman army holding the Çatalca line in defense of the capital at Constantinople. Berk-i Satvet also took part in two brief skirmishes with the Greek Navy.

The Ottoman Empire joined World War I in November 1914; Peyk-i Şevket and Berk-i Satvet primarily operated in the Black Sea against the Russian Black Sea Fleet. They frequently patrolled the Ottoman coast, particularly off the Bosporus, and escorted convoys to western Anatolia. On one of these convoy operations in January 1915, Berk-i Satvet struck a mine that wrecked her stern. She was towed back to Constantinople and repaired, returning to service in 1918. Peyk-i Şevket returned to the Sea of Marmara during the Dardanelles Campaign in 1915, where she carried munitions to the defending Ottoman forces. On 6 August, she was torpedoed by the British submarine HMS E11 and was badly damaged, with repairs lasting until 1917. Both ships were used as convoy escorts in the Black Sea in the final year of the war.

The Treaty of Sèvres that ended the war assigned one of the vessels to Portugal as war reparations, but the subsequent Turkish War of Independence nullified that agreement and ended with the Treaty of Lausanne in 1924, which allowed the new Turkish republic to retain its fleet. The two cruisers were retained by the new Turkish Navy and their names were shortened to Peyk and Berk. Lengthy overhauls followed, in 1924–1925 for Berk and 1927–1929 for Peyk. They were modernized a decade later, in 1936–1938 for Peyk and 1937–1939 for Berk. The ships remained in service until 1944, when they were stricken from the naval register and laid up at the Gölcük Naval Shipyard before being scrapped after 1953.
