= Ottoman destroyer Muavenet-i Milliye =

Ottoman destroyer

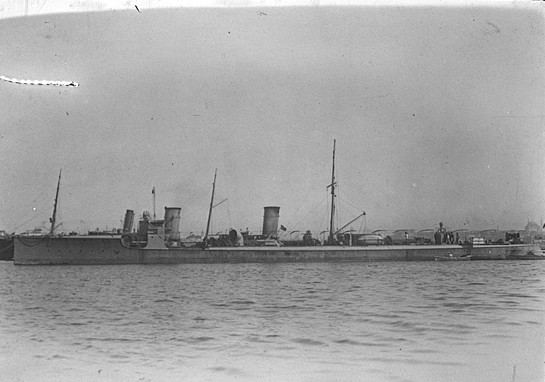
- Destroyer Muâvenet-i Millîye

History

Ottoman Empire
- Name: Muâvenet-i Millîye
- Builder: Schichau-Werke, Germany
- Laid down: 1908
- Launched: 20 March 1909
- Completed: 17 August 1910
- Decommissioned: October 1918
- Fate: Scrapped 1953

General characteristics
- Class & type: Muâvenet-i Millîye-class destroyer
- Displacement: 765 t (753 LT)
- Length: 74 m (243 ft)
- Beam: 7.9 m (26 ft)
- Draft: 3 m (9.8 ft)
- Propulsion: 17700 HP, 2 turbines, 2 boilers
- Speed: 26 kn (48 km/h; 30 mph)
- Range: 1,000 nmi (1,900 km; 1,200 mi) at 17 kn (31 km/h; 20 mph)
- Complement: 90 (peacetime)
- Armament: 2 × 75mm (-/50); 2 × 57mm (-/50); 3 × TT 450mm

Muavenet-i Milliye or Muâvenet-i Millîye was a destroyer built for the Ottoman Navy prior to World War I. The ship is most notable for sinking the British pre-dreadnought battleship Goliath during the Dardanelles Campaign in World War I.

== Naming ==
"Muâvenet" means support in Ottoman Turkish, and the full name of this first ship of that name, "Muâvenet-i Millîye", signifies national support. Her name was given in honor of the Ottoman Navy National Support Association (Donanma-i Osmânî Muâvenet-i Millîye Cemiyeti, in short Navy Association / Donanma Cemiyeti). This association was founded on the initiative of a merchant named Yağcızade Şefik Bey in July 1909, followed shortly afterwards by a wider participation including the more modest layers of the society. It collected funds through voluntary participation from among the Ottoman public to finance her purchase. Muâvenet-i Millîye was the first ship purchased, in Germany, through the financing made available thanks to the efforts of the association. (Note: The collection of funds for the Ottoman Navy took the proportions of a nation-wide affair, with ordinary households contributing their valuables, housewives, for example, donating their jewellery. For details, see "(full text) Naval Competition Between Turkey and Greece in the years 1909–1914 and its impact on the balance of power in the Eastern Mediterranean p.126-133" (PDF) (in Turkish). Trakya University, Edirne, Turkey. Archived from the original (PDF) on 3 February 2007., abstract also in English. Some sources consider the Navy Association to be the direct ancestor of Milli Piyango, the Turkish National Lottery, for the draws of lots it organized within the frame of its fund collection efforts.)

Three other Turkish Navy ships of different periods, the last being presently in service, were later named in memory of Muâvenet-i Millîye to recall her achievement. One of the first aircraft of the Ottoman air squadrons, contemporaneous to the ship, was given the same name.

== Operations ==
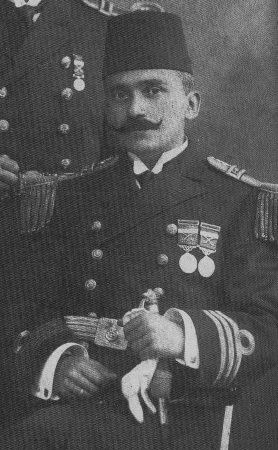
Commander of Muavenet-i Milliye, major Ahmed Saffet Bey

Muavenet-i Milliye and her sister ships, Yadigar-i Millet, Numune-i Hamiyet, and Gayret-i Vataniye, were originally laid down as the German torpedo boats S165-S168. Upon completion, they were sold to the Ottoman Navy in September 1910. (Schichau-Werft built a second group of torpedo boats named S165-S168 as replacements, completing them in 1911.)

As of 1912, the command of Muâvenet-i Millîye was assumed by the Kıdemli Yüzbaşı (senior lieutenant, see Naval officer ranks) Ayasofyali Ahmed Saffed (after the Surname Law of 1934: Ahmet Saffet Ohkay), member of a new generation of officers who were specially trained in view of the more modern ships the Ottoman Navy acquired. In the first months of the Ottoman entry into World War I, the ship was assigned to missions in the Black Sea, from where she was re-directed towards Çanakkale with the start of the Dardanelles Campaign.

=== Sinking of Goliath ===
HMS Goliath was part of the Allied fleet in the naval operations in the Dardanelles Campaign, supporting the landing at Cape Helles on 25 April 1915. On the night of 12–13 May 1915 Goliath was stationed, along with HMS Cornwallis and screened by five destroyers, in Morto Bay off Cape Helles, in an effort to relieve the pressure on the French flank of the landing.

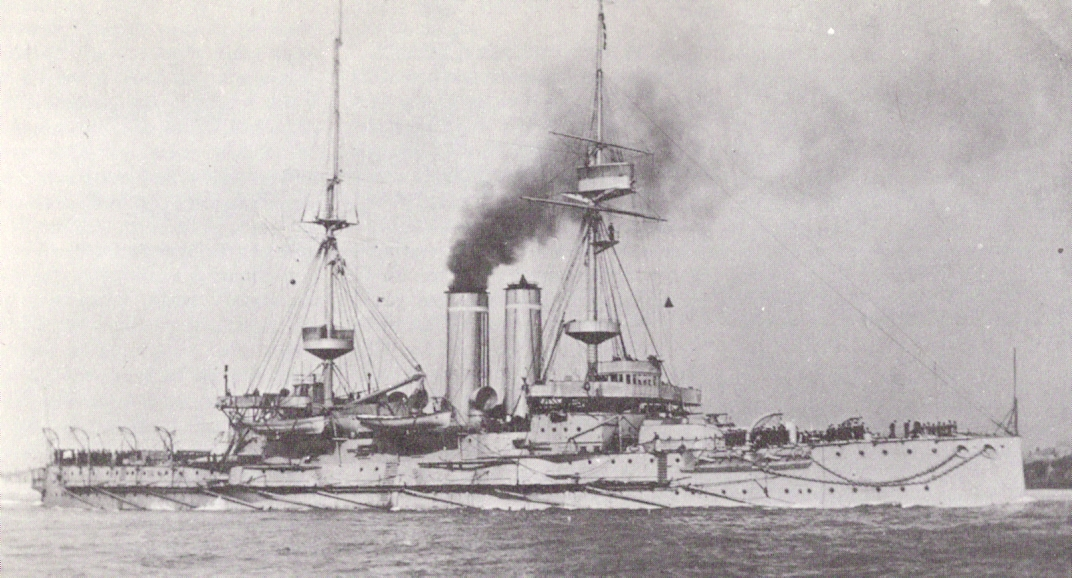
HMS Goliath

The French had asked the assistance of the battleships against the Ottoman counterattacks targeting to recapture Kerevizdere. Thus, every night two battleships began to bombard the Ottoman positions. The Ottoman side, to eliminate damages caused by these battleships, assigned Muâvenet-i-Millîye. During the day, the German captain lieutenant Rudolph Firle and two other officers, who had carried out a reconnaissance mission near Morto Bay earlier, had embarked on Muâvenet-i Millîye to manage the torpedo operations. And on 10 May, at 13:30, Muâvenet-i-Millîye arrived at the strait and the preparations for its new assignment had begun. It was on 12 May, at 18:40, Muâvenet-i-Millîye went into action. Between 19:00 and 19:30, she passed the mines and on 19:40 she anchored in Soğanlıdere and waited until midnight. The projectors of the Allied battleships were closed down at 23:30.

Muâvenet-i-Millîye weighed anchor at 00:30 and slipped through the European side of the strait. The Allied destroyers failed to notice her advance. At 01:00 on the line astern of Muâvenet-i-Millîye, two destroyers were seen, on the forehead was Goliath. Goliath asked the password and Muâvenet-i-Millîye, without losing time, responded with three torpedoes fired by torpedo officer Ali Haydar Öztalay. The first torpedo hit the bridge, the second hit the funnel and the third the stern. The battleship capsized almost immediately taking 570 of the over 700 crew to the bottom, including her captain.

The sinking of Goliath led to direct and drastic upheaval for the British Navy top command and strategy. Two days after the loss of their ship, on 15 May 1915, the First Sea Lord Admiral Fisher resigned amidst bitter arguments with the First Lord of the Admiralty, Winston Churchill, causing, on 17 May, Churchill's resignation too. General Hamilton noted in his diary that, "The Turks deserve a medal." The Allies had failed to achieve their expectations with the landings. Thus, the British began to make plans for the resumption of the naval attack. However, the torpedoing of Goliath had proven that it would be prohibitively expensive to open the straits by a pure naval attack. The valuable modern battleship HMS Queen Elizabeth was recalled from the Dardanelles. The subsequent loss of battleships Triumph at Anzac and Majestic at Cape Helles, both torpedoed by U-21, resulted in a further reduction in naval support for the Allied land troops.

The ship captain, Kıdemli Yüzbaşı Ayasofyali Ahmed Saffed, the German lieutenant Rudolph Firle and his two deputies and the over 90 Ottoman crew were greeted as heroes in Istanbul, all lights along the Bosphorus having been lit specially to their honor, and were rewarded with medals and decorations. (Note: Most importantly, this successful operation boosted the moral of the Ottoman soldiers. Ahmet Saffet Ohkay pursued a successful career in the Turkish Navy, the culmination of which was the top command for a brief period in 1924, during the 1924–1927 transitory phase between the Ottoman Navy and the Turkish Naval Forces. After 1927, he served as deputy in the Turkish Grand National Assembly for three terms. Rudolph Firle wrote a book on the Baltic Sea operations during the war, still a reference, and led a career in the German merchant fleet.)

=== Subsequent Operations ===
At the Battle of Imbros on 20 January 1918, Muavenet-i Milliye and three other Ottoman destroyers sortied from the Dardanelles and engaged the British destroyers Lizard and Tigress which were chasing the crippled Ottoman battlecruiser Yavûz Sultân Selîm. These were driven off, and Yavûz returned to Constantinople.

With the collapse of the Ottoman war effort, Muavenet-i Milliye was decommissioned in October 1918. Discarded by the postwar Turkish Navy in 1924, the ship was used as an accommodation hulk at the Taşkızak shipyard. She was finally scrapped in 1953.
