= Ottoman cruiser Peyk-i Şevket =

Torpedo cruiser of the Ottoman Navy

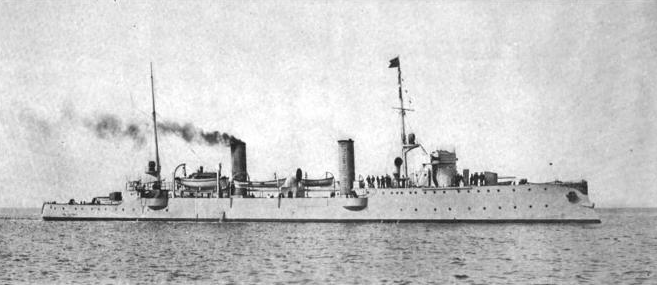
- One of the two Peyk-i Şevket-class cruisers in their original configuration

History

Ottoman Empire
- Name: Peyk-i Şevket
- Ordered: 18 January 1903
- Builder: Germaniawerft, Kiel
- Laid down: February 1906
- Launched: 15 November 1906
- Acquired: 13 November 1907
- Commissioned: November 1907
- Stricken: 1944
- Fate: Broken up for scrap, 1953–1954

General characteristics
- Class & type: Peyk-i Şevket-class cruiser
- Displacement: 775 long tons (787 t)
- Length: 80 m (262 ft 6 in)
- Beam: 8.4 m (27 ft 7 in)
- Draft: 2.5 m (8 ft 2 in)
- Installed power: 4 × water-tube boilers; 5,100 ihp (3,800 kW)
- Propulsion: 2 × triple-expansion steam engines; 2 × screw propellers
- Speed: 21 knots (39 km/h; 24 mph)
- Range: 3,240 nmi (6,000 km; 3,730 mi)
- Complement: 105
- Armament: 2 × 105 mm (4.1 in) guns; 6 × 57 mm (2.2 in) guns; 2 × 37 mm (1.5 in) guns; 3 × 450 mm (17.7 in) torpedo tubes

Peyk-i Şevket was a torpedo cruiser of the Ottoman Navy, built in 1906–1907, the lead ship of her class, which included one other vessel. She was built by the Germaniawerft shipyard in Germany, and was delivered to the Ottoman Navy in November 1907. The ship's primary armament consisted of three 450 mm (17.7 in) torpedo tubes and a pair of 105 mm (4.1 in) guns, and she was capable of a top speed of 21 knots (39 km/h; 24 mph). A major reconstruction in the late 1930s revised her armament and rebuilt her bow and superstructure.

The ship was interned at British-controlled Suez at the start of the Italo-Turkish War of 1911–1912, and as a result she saw no action during the conflict. During the First Balkan War in 1913, she bombarded Bulgarian troops threatening the Ottoman capital at Constantinople. Peyk-i Şevket was torpedoed by the British submarine HMS E11 in August 1915 during the Dardanelles Campaign of World War I. Repairs lasted until 1917, and in the final year of the war she served in the Black Sea, escorting troop ships to the Caucasus. Renamed Peyk in 1923, the ship continued in service with the Turkish Navy following the collapse of the Ottoman Empire until 1944, when she was decommissioned. She was broken up for scrap in 1953–1954.

== Design ==
Peyk-i Şevket, classified as a torpedo cruiser by the Ottoman Navy, was also sometimes referred to as a torpedo gunboat. She was 80 m (262 ft 6 in) long, with a beam of 8.4 m (27 ft 7 in) and a draft of 2.5 m (8 ft 2 in). She displaced 775 long tons (787 t) while on sea trials. The ship was powered by a pair of vertical triple-expansion steam engines each driving a screw propeller. Four coal-burning water-tube boilers provided steam for the engines, and they were vented through a pair of funnels. The engines were rated at 5,100 indicated horsepower (3,800 kW) for a top speed of 21 knots (39 km/h; 24 mph); Peyk-i Şevket had a cruising radius of 3,240 nautical miles (6,000 km; 3,730 mi). Her crew numbered 105 officers and enlisted men.

Peyk-i Şevket's primary offensive armament was her three 450 mm (17.7 in) torpedo tubes. One was mounted in the bow, above water, and the other two were in deck-mounted swivel launchers amidships. She was armed with a pair of 105 mm (4.1 in) guns that were placed in shielded single mounts on the forecastle and quarterdeck. For close-range defense against torpedo boats, she also carried six 57 mm (2.2 in) guns, four of which were mounted in sponsons, and a pair of 37 mm (1.5 in) guns. She had no armor protection.

== Service history ==
Peyk-i Şevket was ordered on 18 January 1903 and laid down in February 1906 at the Germaniawerft shipyard in Kiel, Germany. She was launched on 15 November of that year, and completed in 1907. After completing sea trials, she was transferred to the Ottoman Navy, arriving in Constantinople on 13 November, where she was formally commissioned into the Ottoman fleet. Rauf Orbay took command of the ship in 1908, and held the position until 1911. In 1909, she and her sister participated in the first fleet maneuver conducted by the Ottoman Navy in twenty years.

At the outbreak of the Italo-Turkish War in September 1911, Peyk-i Şevket was in the Red Sea; on 2 October, she encountered the Italian torpedo cruiser Aretusa and the gunboat Volturno off Al Hudaydah. The two Italian vessels forced Peyk-i Şevket to flee into the port, bombarded the dock facilities, and then withdrew. Peyk-i Şevket was later interned for the duration of the war in British-controlled Suez. In March 1913 during the First Balkan War, the ship was sent to the Black Sea to support the Çatalca garrison, which was under renewed attacks by the Bulgarian army during the Second Battle of Çatalca. After heavy bombardment from the Ottoman fleet, including Peyk-i Şevket, the Bulgarians were forced to retreat on 30 March.

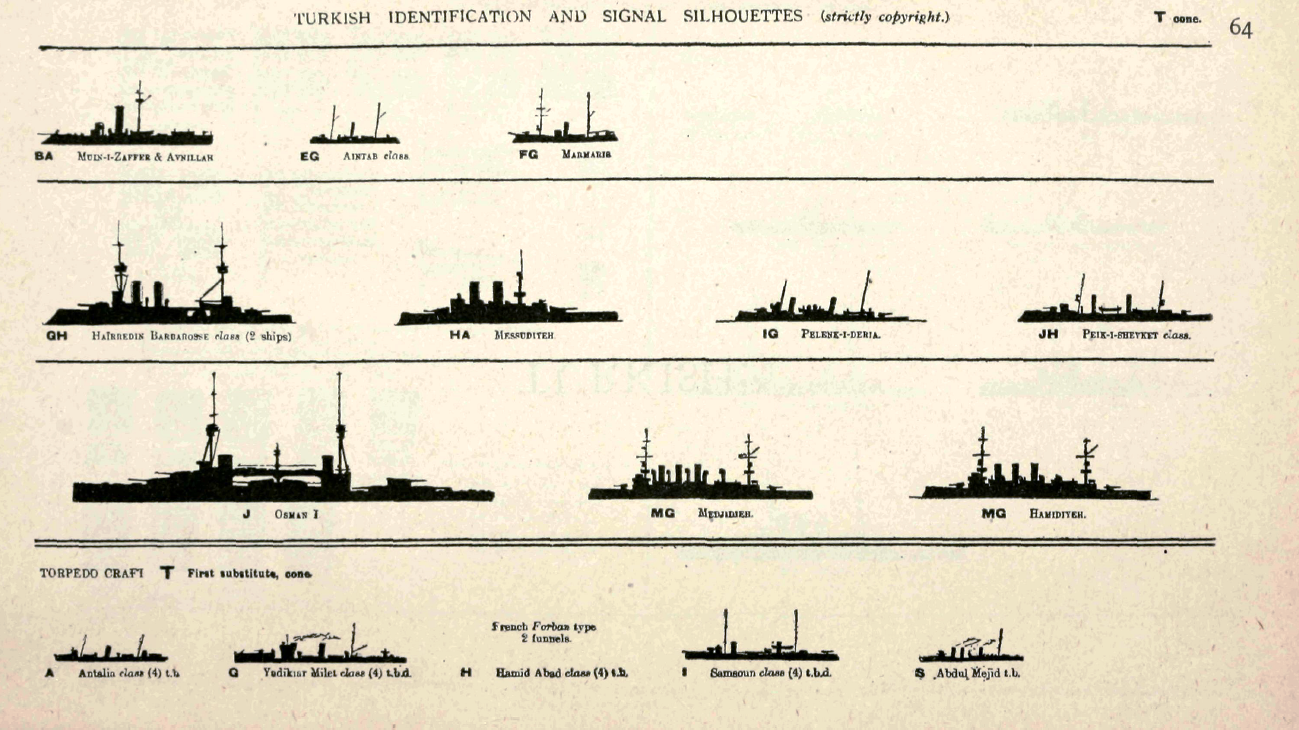
Silhouettes of the major warships of the Ottoman Navy in 1914; the Peyk-i Şevket-class is the fourth ship in the second row

On 3 August 1914, Peyk-i Şevket steamed to Constantinople, where she was scheduled to begin a lengthy overhaul. But due to the growing tensions in the region due to the outbreak of World War I in Europe, the ship was only painted and loaded with ammunition, fuel, and stores. On 20 November, Peyk-i Şevket and the battlecruiser Yavuz Sultan Selim, formerly the German Goeben, for a patrol off the Bosporus. In December, the ship joined Yavuz Sultan Selim, the ex-German light cruiser Midilli, and her sister Berk-i Satvet to escort a convoy of four troop transports to Rize. On 22 June 1915, Peyk-i Şevket was nearly torpedoed by the British submarine HMS E12 in the Sea of Marmara while she was transporting ammunition to the Ottoman garrison at Çanakkale. Two months later, HMS E11 successfully torpedoed the ship on 6 August, causing serious damage.

The ship returned to service by 1917, and as of July 1918, the ship was back in service, being used as an escort for troopships between Constantinople and the Caucasus. She was decommissioned in the final weeks of the war, on 30 October 1918, and laid up in Constantinople. On 30 November, the Ottoman Empire signed the Armistice of Mudros with the Entente powers, which concluded the conflict.

The ship was renamed Peyk in 1923 following the end of the Turkish War of Independence, which saw the Republic of Turkey replace the old Ottoman Empire. At the time, the ship was one of a handful of major warships still in active service, after more than a decade of near continuous war for the Turkish fleet. From 1925 to 1927, she was modernized at the Gölcük Naval Shipyard and was recommissioned in 1927. She was rebuilt in 1936–1938 and incorporated substantial improvements. Her stem was replaced and her superstructure was rebuilt. The old gun armament was replaced with a pair of 88 mm (3.5 in) 45-caliber guns and four 37 mm 40-caliber guns. The ship continued in service until 1944, when she was stricken from the naval register. The ship was laid up in Izmit and broken up between 1953 and 1954 at the Gölcük shipyard.
