= Ottoman torpedo boat Sultanhisar =

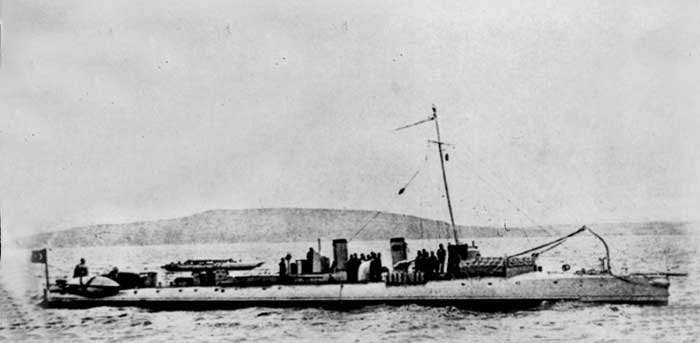

History

Turkey
- Name: Sultanhisar
- Namesake: Sultanhisar
- Owner: Ottoman Navy, Turkish Navy
- Ordered: 25 October 1906
- Builder: Schneider & Cie in Chalon-sur-Saône, France
- Laid down: 1906
- Launched: 1907
- Completed: 1907
- Commissioned: 1907
- Recommissioned: 1924
- Decommissioned: 1928
- Stricken: 1935
- Fate: Scrapped 1935

General characteristics
- Type: Torpedo boat
- Displacement: 97 tons (full load)
- Length: 40.2 m (131 ft 11 in)
- Beam: 4.4 m (14 ft 5 in)
- Draft: 1.9 m (6 ft 3 in)
- Propulsion: Steam, 1 shaft; 2 Du Temple water tube, Schneider & Cie, 11.2 t coal 1 triple expansion 3 cyl., 2,200 ihp (1,600 kW), Schneider & Cie
- Speed: 26 knots (48 km/h) (trial), 16 knots (30 km/h) (1915)
- Complement: 3 officers, 17–20 ratings (1907); 32 Ottomans, 4 Germans (1915)
- Armament: 2 × 37 mm (1.46 in) QF H guns; 3 × TT 450 mm (18 in) SK torpedoes

Sultanhisar was a torpedo boat of the Ottoman Navy. She was built in 1907 by Schneider & Cie in Chalon-sur-Saône, France, and transferred the same year to the Ottoman Empire. She is best known for her action during the Gallipoli Campaign of World War I as she sank Royal Australian Navy submarine HMAS AE2 in the Sea of Marmara and captured her crew.

== Task ==
As of 16 October 1912, Sulthanisar was assigned to the Bosporus Fleet Command. From 19 December 1912 on, she served at the Armoured Warship Division.

During the naval operations in the Dardanelles Campaign of World War I, the torpedo boat Sultanhisar was tasked with patrolling in the Dardanelles Strait. In addition, she daily transported German general Otto Liman von Sanders, who was the adviser and military commander of the Ottoman Army, between Eceabat and Gallipoli. On 29 April 1915, she received orders to return to Constantinople by sailing along the west coast of the Sea of Marmara. On the way, Commander Ali Rıza Bey changed his route and sailed eastwards in response to reports of the presence of a possible enemy submarine in that area.

== Attack on Australian submarine ==
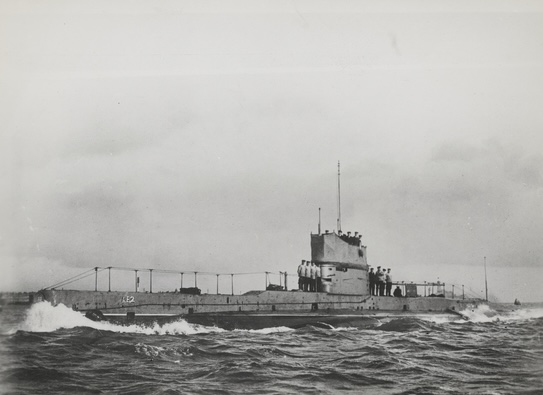
Royal Australian Navy submarine HMAS AE2

The Australian submarine HMAS AE2 was able to pass through the blocked Dardanelles Strait and entered the Sea of Marmara on the early hours of 25 April 1915. She was the first Allied ship to perform the feat.

Sultanhisar sighted the submarine in the morning of 30 April in the Erdek Bay near Bandırma. AE2 tried to escape by diving and surfacing several times. Torpedoes were exchanged between the two warships unsuccessfully. In the meantime, Sultanhisar called the Ottoman gunboats Zuhaf and Aydın Reis, which were patrolling in the area, for help. Finally, the submarine surfaced about 100 m (110 yd) from the torpedo boat. Sultanhisar opened fire and hit the submarine's engine room.

Lieutenant Commander Henry Hugh Gordon Stoker scuttled AE2 by opening all tanks and flooding his submarine, which was unable to maneuver. The crew abandoned the vessel, and she went down at 10:45. At this moment, the two Ottoman gunboats arrived at the scene and offered to rescue the submarine's crew, who had all survived the attack. Rejecting that offer, Commander Ali Rıza Bey took the 32 sailors on board and sailed back to Gallipoli. After picking up two more POWs, one French and one British soldier, in Gallipoli, Sultanhisar headed for Istanbul.

== Aftermath ==
Sultanhisar served until the end of the war and was decommissioned by the end of October 1918, after the Armistice of Mudros. Following the foundation of the Turkish Republic in 1923 in place of the dissolved Ottoman Empire, she returned in 1924 to service in the Turkish Navy. She was decommissioned in 1928 and was broken up in 1935.

== See also ==
- World War I naval ships of the Ottoman Empire
