= Ahmet Saffet Okay =

Turkish politician

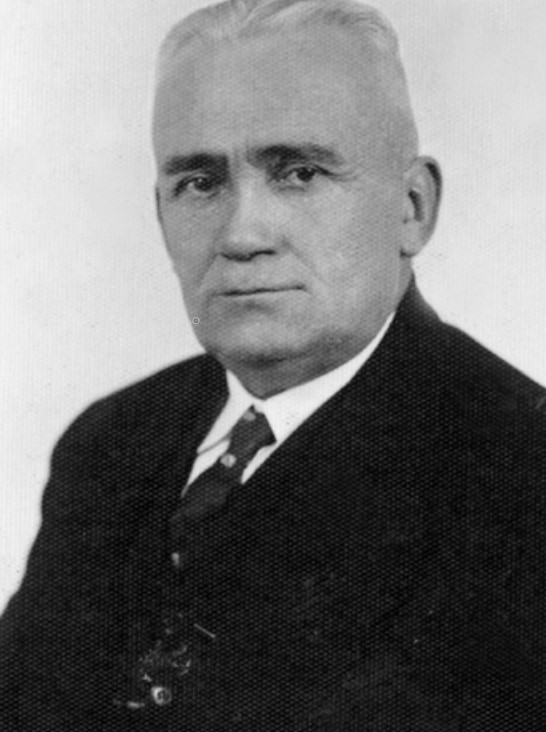

Member of the Grand National Assembly

Personal details
- Born: 1876 Constantinople, Ottoman Empire
- Died: 18 May 1938 (aged 61–62) Istanbul, Turkey

Ahmet Saffet Ohkay (1876 – 18 May 1938) was a Turkish admiral and politician, who played a crucial role during the Dardanelles Campaign in World War I. He was the commander of Muavenet-i Milliye, the Ottoman destroyer that sank HMS Goliath.
