= Ottoman cruiser Berk-i Satvet =

Torpedo cruiser of the Ottoman Navy

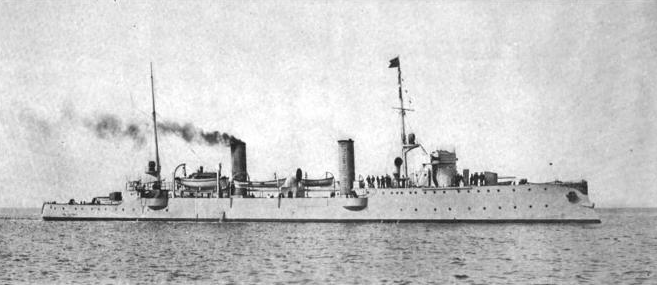
- One of the two Peyk-i Şevket-class cruisers

History

Ottoman Empire
- Name: Berk-i Satvet
- Ordered: 18 January 1903
- Builder: Germaniawerft, Kiel
- Laid down: February 1906
- Launched: 1 December 1906
- Acquired: 13 November 1907
- Commissioned: November 1907
- Stricken: 1944
- Fate: Broken up for scrap, 1953–1955

General characteristics
- Class & type: Peyk-i Şevket-class cruiser
- Displacement: 775 long tons (787 t)
- Length: 80 m (262 ft 6 in)
- Beam: 8.4 m (27 ft 7 in)
- Draft: 2.5 m (8 ft 2 in)
- Installed power: 4 × water-tube boilers; 5,100 ihp (3,800 kW)
- Propulsion: 2 × triple-expansion steam engines; 2 × screw propellers
- Speed: 21 knots (39 km/h; 24 mph)
- Range: 3,240 nmi (6,000 km; 3,730 mi)
- Complement: 105
- Armament: 2 × 105 mm (4.1 in) guns; 6 × 57 mm (2.2 in) guns; 2 × 37 mm (1.5 in) guns; 3 × 450 mm (17.7 in) torpedo tubes

Berk-i Satvet was a torpedo cruiser of the Ottoman Navy, the second and final member of the Peyk-i Şevket class. She was built by the Germaniawerft shipyard in Germany in 1906–1907, and was delivered to the Ottoman Navy in November 1907. The ship's primary armament consisted of three 450 mm (17.7 in) torpedo tubes and a pair of 105 mm (4.1 in) guns, and she was capable of a top speed of 21 knots (39 km/h; 24 mph). The ship's early career was uneventful; the Italo-Turkish War of 1911–1912 passed without any action of the Ottoman fleet. Berk-i Satvet saw action during the Balkan Wars of 1912–1913 in the Aegean and Black Seas, against Greek and Bulgarian opponents, respectively.

After the Ottoman Empire entered World War I, Berk-i Satvet was employed in patrols in the Black Sea. These included attacks on Russian ports with the ex-German warships Yavuz Sultan Selim and Midilli. In January 1915, Berk-i Satvet struck a naval mine while escorting a convoy to Zonguldak; the explosion severely damaged the ship and kept her out of service until April 1918. For the remainder of the war, she patrolled the Black Sea. The ship was renamed Berk in 1923 and modernized twice, in the mid-1920s and in the late-1930s. She remained in service until 1944, when she was stricken from the naval register. Berk was ultimately broken up for scrap in 1953–1955.

== Design ==
Berk-i Satvet, classified as a torpedo cruiser by the Ottoman Navy (torpido-kruvazör), was also sometimes referred to as a torpedo gunboat. She was 80 m (262 ft 6 in) long, with a beam of 8.4 m (27 ft 7 in) and a draft of 2.5 m (8 ft 2 in). She displaced 775 long tons (787 t) while on sea trials. The ship was powered by a pair of vertical triple-expansion steam engines each driving a screw propeller. Four coal-burning water-tube boilers provided steam for the engines, and they were vented through a pair of funnels. The engines were rated at 5,100 indicated horsepower (3,800 kW) for a top speed of 21 knots (39 km/h; 24 mph); Berk-i Satvet had a cruising radius of 3,240 nautical miles (6,000 km; 3,730 mi). Her crew numbered 105 officers and enlisted men.

Berk-i Satvet's primary offensive armament was her three 450 mm (17.7 in) torpedo tubes. One was mounted in the bow, above water, and the other two were in deck-mounted swivel launchers amidships. She was armed with a pair of 105 mm (4.1 in) guns that were placed in shielded single mounts on the forecastle and quarterdeck. For close-range defense against torpedo boats, she also carried six 57 mm (2.2 in) guns, four of which were mounted in sponsons, and a pair of 37 mm (1.5 in) guns. She had no armor protection.

== Service history ==
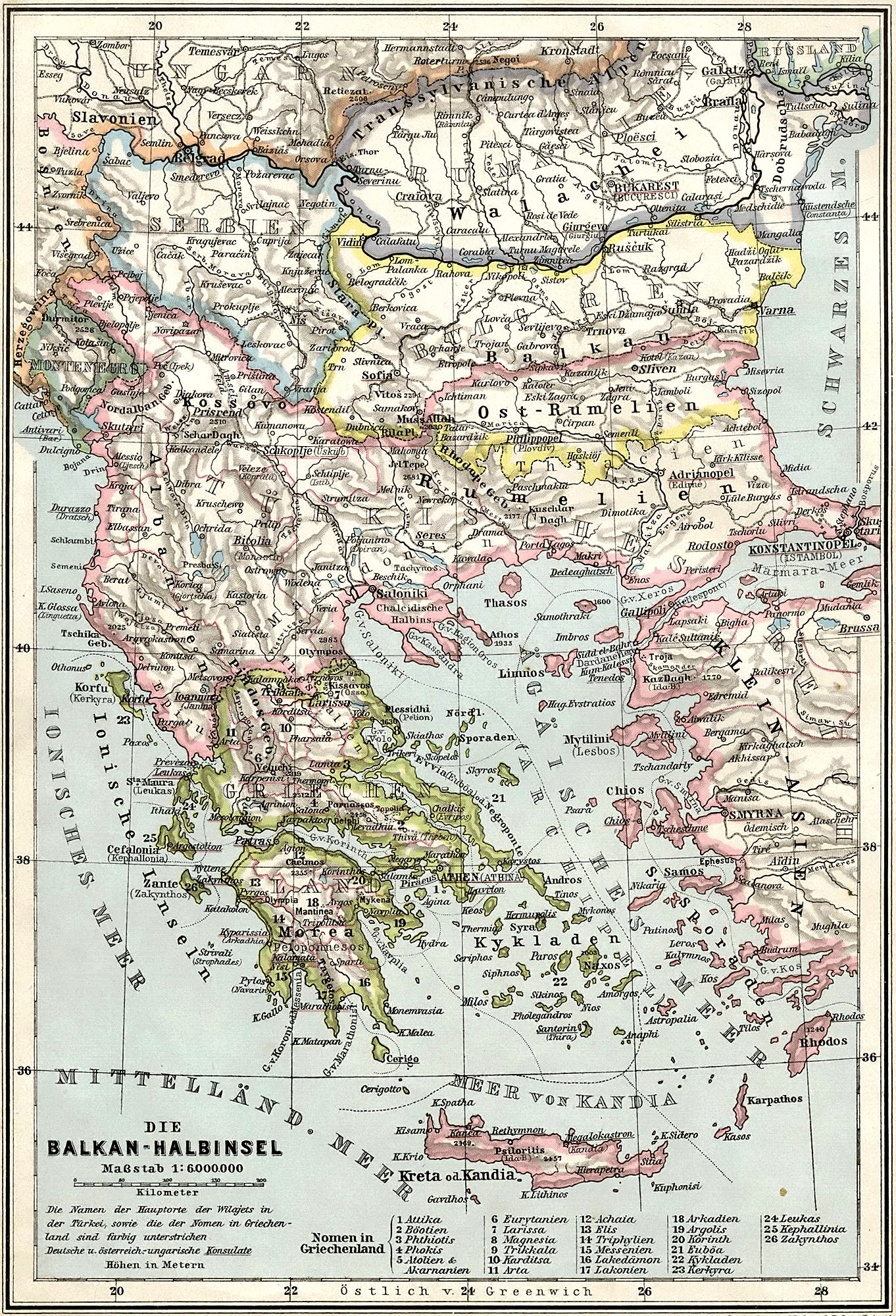
Map of Ottoman holdings in the Balkans before the Balkan Wars

Berk-i Satvet was ordered on 18 January 1903 and laid down in February 1906 at the Germaniawerft shipyard in Kiel, Germany. She was launched on 1 December of that year, and completed in 1907. After completing sea trials, she was transferred to the Ottoman Navy, arriving in Constantinople on 13 November, where she was formally commissioned into the Ottoman fleet. The name meant the Lighting of the Almighty. In 1909, she and her sister participated in the first fleet maneuver conducted by the Ottoman Navy in twenty years. During the Italo-Turkish War of 1911–1912, Berk-i Satvet was assigned to the Reserve Division, which was centered on the elderly ironclads Mesudiye and Âsâr-ı Tevfik. She did not see action during the conflict, since the bulk of the Ottoman fleet spent the war in port.

=== Balkan Wars ===
Berk-i Satvet was transferred to the Black Sea on 9 December 1912, to reinforce the squadron there during the First Balkan War. Later that month, she went to the Aegean to take part in operations against the Greeks. On 20 December, she, the protected cruiser Mecidiye, and a division of torpedo boats left the Dardanelles for Imbros in an attempt to trap a group of Greek destroyers that was operating off the straits. At 09:55, the two Ottoman cruisers encountered a group of six Greek destroyers, but after a few minutes of firing, the Greeks disengaged and fled. While cruising off Bozcaada at 10:40, they found the Greek destroyer Aspis. Aspis turned and fled, and during the pursuit, Mecidiye was attacked unsuccessfully by the submarine Delfin. At 11:00, Berk-i Satvet and Mecidiye broke off the chase and returned to the straits.

In the aftermath of the action around Bozcaada, the Ottoman Army became convinced that it could recapture the island from the Greeks with a small contingent of troops, and so planning began for an amphibious assault on the island. Berk-i Satvet, Mecidiye, and the protected cruiser Hamidiye were to provide fire support during the landing. The three cruisers departed Çanakkale at 06:00 on 4 January 1913 and passed Cape Helles at around 7:15, accompanied by a squadron of destroyers. Fifteen minutes later, they encountered a Greek squadron and at 7:40 the two sides began a short exchange of fire at long range but neither side sought to press the attack. Berk-i Satvet and Mecidiye turned to cover the force from a possible attack from the direction of Bozcaada. By 10:00, the Ottoman battleship division had joined the rest of the fleet, and Berk-i Satvet took up a position astern of the battleships. With the Greek squadron threatening to cut the Ottomans off from the Dardanelles by 11:30, the Ottomans turned back to return to the safety of the straits. A short engagement forced the Greeks to withdraw without either side incurring damage, and by 15:30, Berk-i Satvet and the rest of the fleet had returned to Çanakkale. The army subsequently abandoned the idea of retaking Bozcaada.

On 4 February 1913, Berk-i Satvet bombarded Bulgarian positions at Şarköy on the northern coast of the Sea of Marmara in preparation for an amphibious assault. Four days later, the Ottoman navy returned to support the landing at Şarköy. Turgut Reis and Barbaros Hayreddin, along with two small cruisers provided artillery support to the right flank of the invading force once it went ashore. The ships were positioned about one kilometer off shore, with Berk-i Satvet leading the line, which also included Mecidiye and the pre-dreadnought battleships Barbaros Hayreddin and Turgut Reis. The Bulgarian army resisted fiercely, which ultimately forced the Ottoman army to retreat, though the withdrawal was successful in large part due to the gunfire support from the fleet. Berk-i Satvet and Mecidiye covered the left flank while the two battleships supported the left during the evacuation. In the course of the operation, Berk-i Satvet had fired eighty-four 105 mm shells.

On 9 March, Berk-i Satvet joined a sweep toward Imbros, an island in the Aegean Sea at the entrance to the Gulf of Saros; she briefly engaged a pair of Greek destroyers and stopped a steamer flying under the French flag. The vessel, which appeared to be supplying Bulgarian forces, was taken as a prize by the destroyer Yarhisar. Later in March, she again escorted Barbaros Hayreddin and Turgut Reis in the Black Sea, while the two battleships bombarded Bulgarian troops that were attempting to breach the line of defenses at Çatalca. On 13 April, Berk-i Satvet joined a fleet consisting of Barbaros Hayreddin, Turgut Reis, Âsâr-ı Tevfik, and several smaller warships. The ships sortied out of the Dardanelles and encountered a Greek fleet. After a brief engagement at extreme range, the Ottomans and Greeks withdrew to the Dardanelles and Imbros, respectively.

=== World War I ===
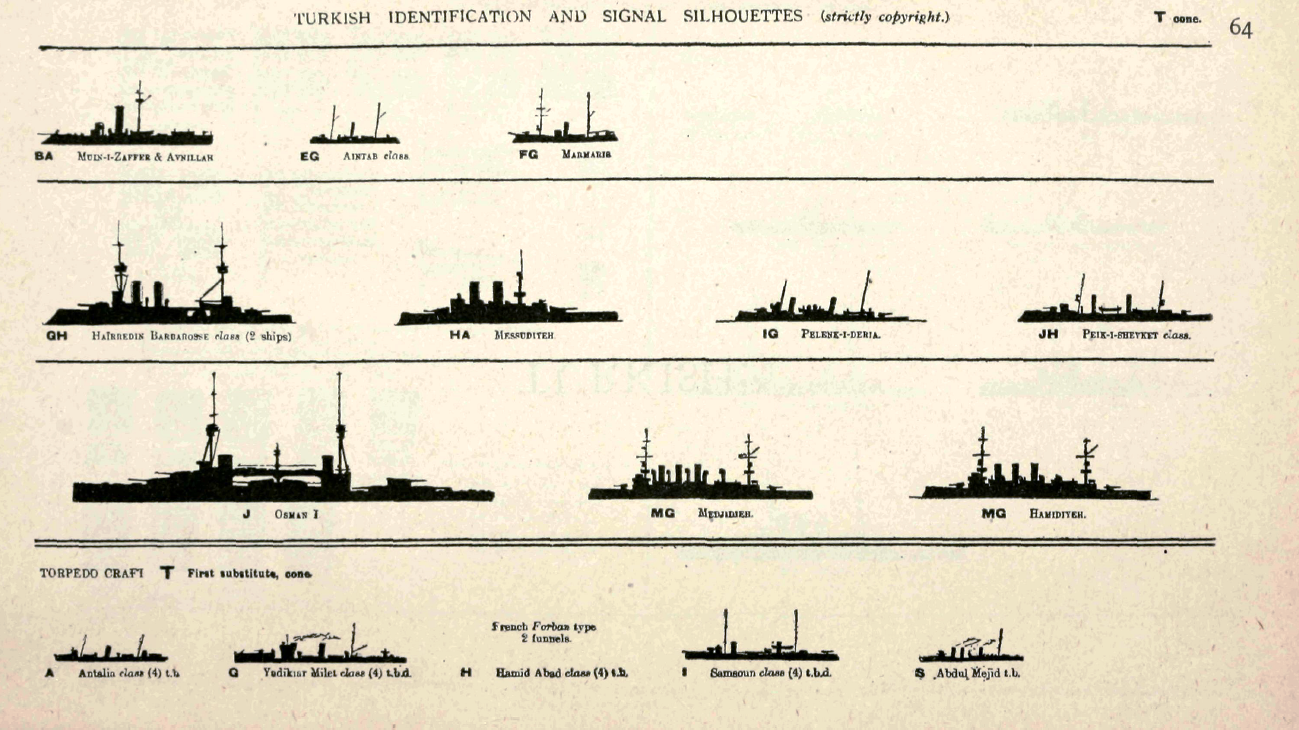
Silhouettes of the major warships of the Ottoman Navy in 1914; the Peyk-i Şevket-class is the fourth ship in the second row

In late July 1914, World War I broke out in Europe, though the Ottomans initially remained neutral. On 14 August, Berk-i Satvet joined patrols of the Dardanelles, the defenses of which were strengthened with several new minefields. Tensions between the Ottomans and a British fleet patrolling the entrance to the Dardanelles increased until 5 November, when Britain and France declared war on the Ottoman Empire. In the meantime, Berk-i Satvet had been transferred to the Black Sea. She joined the cruiser Midilli, formerly the German Breslau, for an attack on the Russian port of Novorossiysk on 29 October. Berk-i Satvet embarked on another attack, this time with the battlecruiser Yavuz Sultan Selim, formerly the German Goeben. The battlecruiser shelled Sevastopol while Berk-i Satvet observed; she had been sent with Yavuz Sultan Selim primarily to train her crew.

Berk-i Satvet sortied with her sister and Yavuz Sultan Selim on 5 December to provide distant support to a troop convoy headed to Rize. On 2 January 1915 at 15:00, she, Midilli, and Hamidiye steamed out of the Bosporus to escort a transport to Zonguldak, after which the three cruisers are to conduct a patrol off the port. At 18:00 into the voyage, a Russian mine exploded, which led Berk-i Satvet's commander to take evasive action. The ship struck a mine in the darkness, which caused significant damage. The mine destroyed both of her propellers and caused serious flooding at her stern. Two tugs arrived and towed Berk-i Satvet to İstinye with Hamidiye as an escort. The damage was so severe that the ship was disabled for most of the war. After lengthy repairs, the ship was recommissioned on 1 April 1918 and patrols between Constantinople and Batumi. She remained in the Black Sea through the end of the war. On 30 November, the Ottoman Empire signed the Armistice of Mudros with the Entente powers, which concluded the conflict.

=== Later career ===
The ship was renamed Berk in 1923 following the end of the Turkish War of Independence, which saw the Republic of Turkey replace the old Ottoman Empire. At the time, the ship had been placed out of service. From 1924 to 1925, she was modernized at the Gölcük Naval Shipyard and was recommissioned in 1925. In 1927, the ship visited İzmir. She was rebuilt in 1937–1939 and incorporated substantial improvements. Her stem was replaced and her superstructure was rebuilt. The old gun armament was replaced with a pair of 88 mm (3.5 in) 45-caliber guns and four 37 mm 40-caliber guns, and equipment to handle 25 mines was installed. The ship continued in service until 1944, when she was stricken from the naval register. She was hulked at the Gölcük shipyard in 1950, and broken up for scrap between 1953 and 1955.
