= HMS E11 =

Submarine of the Royal Navy

- HMS E11 off the Dardanelles in 1915

History

United Kingdom
- Name: E11
- Launched: 23 April 1914
- Commissioned: 19 September 1914
- Fate: Sold for scrap, Malta, March 1921

General characteristics
- Class & type: E-class submarine
- Displacement: 662 long tons (673 t) surfaced; 807 long tons (820 t) submerged
- Length: 181 ft (55 m)
- Beam: 15 ft (4.6 m)
- Propulsion: 2 × 800 hp (597 kW) diesels; 2 × 420 hp (313 kW) electric; 2 screws
- Speed: 15.25 knots (28.24 km/h; 17.55 mph) surfaced; 10.25 knots (18.98 km/h; 11.80 mph) submerged
- Range: 3,000 nmi (5,600 km) at 10 kn (19 km/h; 12 mph); 65 nmi (120 km) at 5 kn (9.3 km/h; 5.8 mph)
- Complement: 30
- Armament: 5 × 18-inch (450 mm) torpedo tubes (2 bow, 2 beam, 1 stern); 1 × 12-pounder gun

HMS E11 was an E-class submarine of the Royal Navy launched on 23 April 1914. E11 was one of the most successful submarines in action during the 1915 naval operations in the Dardanelles Campaign, sinking over 80 vessels of all sizes in three tours of the Sea of Marmara.

== Design ==
Like all post-E8 British E-class submarines, E11 had a displacement of 662 long tons (673 t) at the surface and 807 long tons (820 t) while submerged. She had a total length of 180 feet (55 m) and a beam of 22 feet 8.5 inches (6.922 m). She was powered by two 800 horsepower (600 kW) Vickers eight-cylinder two-stroke diesel engines and two 420 horsepower (310 kW) electric motors. The submarine had a maximum surface speed of 16 knots (30 km/h; 18 mph) and a submerged speed of 10 knots (19 km/h; 12 mph). British E-class submarines had fuel capacities of 50 long tons (51 t) of diesel and ranges of 3,255 miles (5,238 km; 2,829 nmi) when travelling at 10 knots (19 km/h; 12 mph). E11 was capable of operating submerged for five hours when travelling at 5 knots (9.3 km/h; 5.8 mph).

E11 initially did not have a deck gun. After her first Dardanelles tour, she was fitted with a 12-pounder 76 mm (3.0 in) QF by the dockyard in Malta.

She had five 18-inch (450 mm) torpedo tubes, two in the bow, one either side amidships, and one in the stern; a total of 10 torpedoes were carried.

E-class submarines had wireless systems with 1 kilowatt (1.3 hp) power ratings; in some submarines, these were later upgraded to 3 kilowatts (4.0 hp) systems by removing a midship torpedo tube. Their maximum design depth was 100 feet (30 m) although in service some reached depths of below 200 feet (61 m). Some submarines contained Fessenden oscillator systems.

== Crew ==
Her complement was three officers and 28 men.

== Service history ==
=== European operations ===
E11 joined the 8th Submarine Flotilla at Harwich following sea trials on 2 October 1914 under the command of Lieutenant-Commander Martin Nasmith.

Later that month, on her first war patrol E11 was dispatched to the Baltic Sea along with two other submarines. Nasmith was deterred from breaking through the entrance to the Baltic by numerous vessels and warships in Swedish waters during a night passage. Next morning he mistook Havmanden, a submarine of neutral Denmark, for the German submarine SM U-3. The misidentification was principally caused by the pennant number "3" on her conning tower. Two torpedoes were fired, one of which glanced off the bottom of the hull, causing no damage and a minor diplomatic incident. E11 then returned to Harwich.

During the Scarborough Raid in December 1914, E11 was sent into the Heligoland Bight to intercept the returning German Fleet. However, it had already returned to harbour by the time E11 arrived. On the following morning Nasmith was able to attack the battleships of the 1.Geschwader in transit from the Elbe to the Jade. His torpedo missed the leading battleship, SMS Ostfriesland, which was unaware of the attack.

E11 took part in the Cuxhaven Raid, which culminated on 25 December 1914 in the attack by seven seaplanes from the seaplane carriers HMS Engadine, HMS Riviera, and HMS Empress (escorted by three cruisers and several destroyers of the Harwich Force) on Zeppelin sheds and other military targets near Cuxhaven. Four of the aircraft failed to regain their ships. E11 was acting as a mark boat on their return route. Three aircraft which were running out of fuel saw E11 and alighted nearby. The five aircrew were rescued by E11 whilst Zeppelin L 5 (LZ 28) closed to attack. Two bombs were dropped and exploded nearby as E11 submerged. Nasmith received a mention in despatches.

=== Mediterranean operations ===
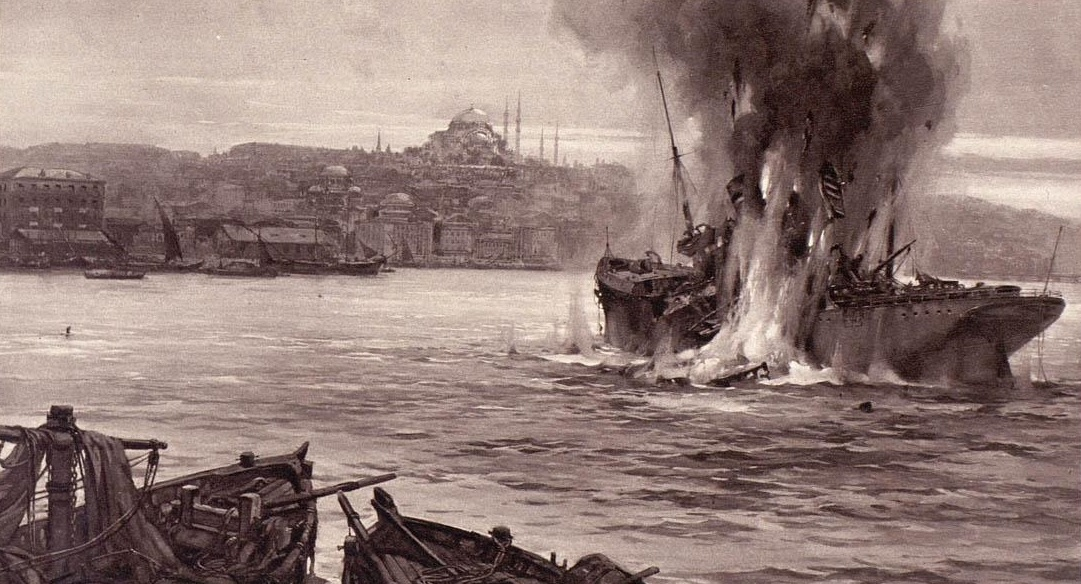
E11 torpedoes the Stamboul off Constantinople, 25 May 1915

In May 1915, still commanded by Nasmith, E11 arrived at the Dardanelles to join the submarine campaign in the Sea of Marmara. E11 was the second submarine to undertake a successful tour, following the E14 which had passed through the straits on 27 April.

The E11 passed through the Dardanelles on the night of 18 May. Surfacing off the town of Gallipoli, Nasmith captured a Turkish sailing vessel and lashed it to the conning tower to act as a disguise. However, this ruse failed to attract any targets, so after several days he abandoned it. Travelling up the Sea of Marmara, he sank a gunboat and several other small craft on 23 May. The following day, near the port of Rodosto (today Tekirdağ), E11 encountered the Turkish transport Nagara, laden with ammunition. Aboard the transport was an American journalist, Raymond Gram Swing, from the Chicago Daily News. Nasmith sank the ship after it was abandoned by the crew and passengers. Nasmith sank another transport and forced one aground before being driven away from the shore by some Turkish cavalry.

On 25 May 1915 E11 reached Constantinople (now Istanbul). Nasmith was searching for the German warships SMS Goeben and SMS Breslau, but when he surfaced at 12:40, he sighted the elderly transport Stamboul lying alongside the Tophane Arsenal. Nasmith's first torpedo ran in a circle and nearly struck the E11, however the second torpedo hit Stamboul. Under fire from shore-based artillery, E11 dived to make her escape. Caught in the strong Bosphorus current, E11 was out of control for 20 minutes until she settled on the bottom near the Leander Tower. Stamboul failed to sink, but was beached at Harem. E11's attack on Constantinople, the first by an enemy vessel in over 100 years, had an enormous impact on Turkish morale, causing a panic in the city and compelling Goeben to shift to a safer mooring.

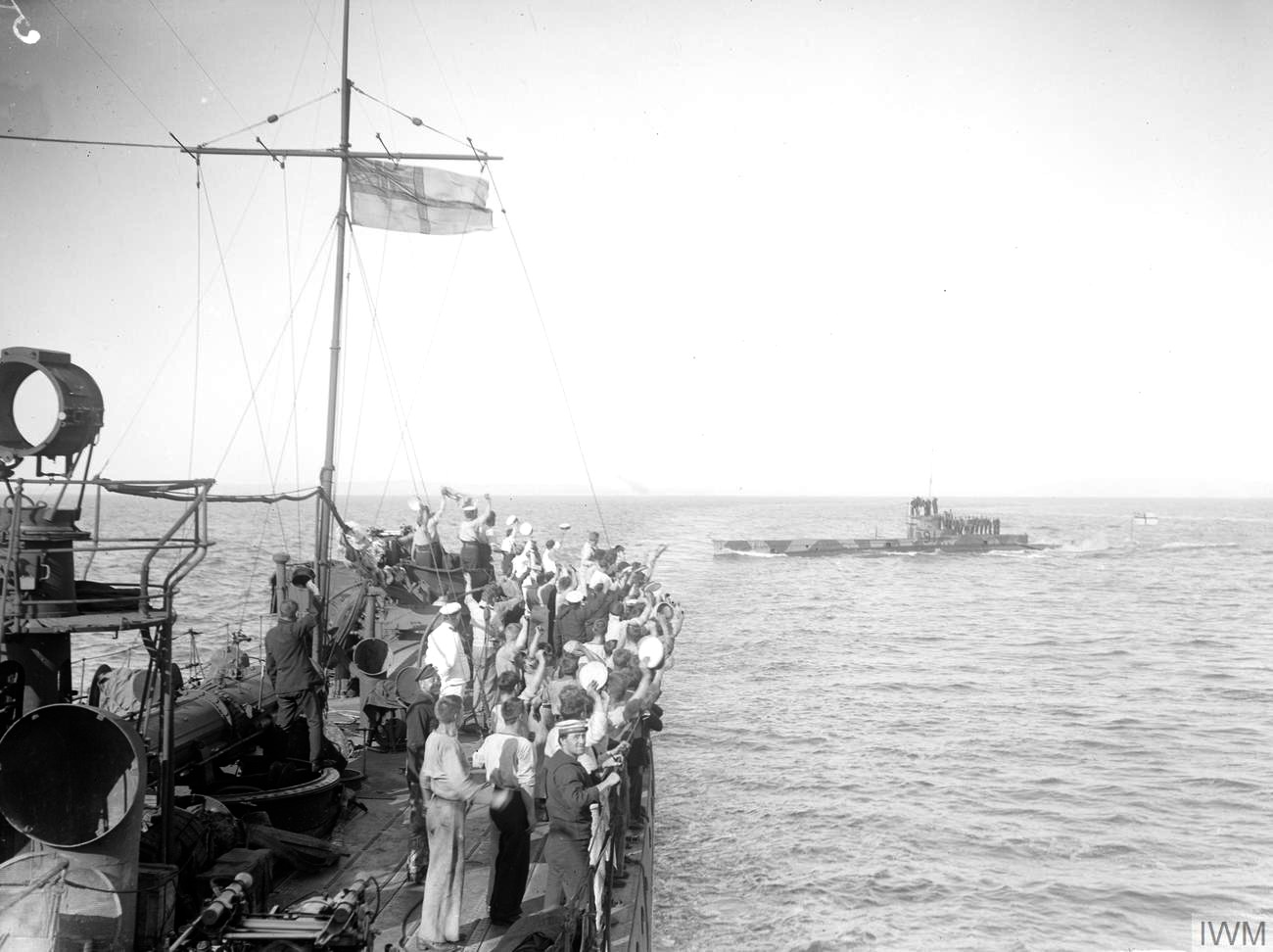
The crew of HMS Grampus cheering the surfaced E11 after a successful attack, 1915.

E11 returned to the Bosphorus approaches on 27 May and sank more ships, but running short of torpedoes and with mounting mechanical problems, Nasmith headed home on 5 June. On his return passage through the Dardanelles he encountered an anchored transport near the Moussa Bank which, despite his vulnerable position and the poor state of the submarine, he attacked and sank with his final torpedo. Passing through the Narrows near Kilid Bahr, E11 snagged a moored mine. Nasmith had to tow the mine out of the straits before he was able to disentangle the submarine. On E11's first tour, eleven ships were sunk or disabled. For this successful tour Nasmith was awarded the Victoria Cross, the third submarine commander to receive the award during the Dardanelles Campaign.

E11 was on her second tour when, on 6 August, she successfully torpedoed the Turkish torpedo cruiser Peyk-i Şevket, causing serious damage. Two days later 8 August 1915 as a new British landing was underway at Suvla, E11 torpedoed the antiquated Turkish pre-dreadnought battleship Barbaros Hayreddin off Bulair at the northern entrance to the Dardanelles. The ship sank with the loss of 21 officers and 237 men. Barbaros Hayreddin was one of two Ottoman battleships sunk during the campaign. Visiting Constantinople again, E11 sank a Black Sea collier Isfahan as it was preparing to unload — a significant blow as coal was the main fuel source and supplies were scarce. Moving into the Gulf of Izmit, on the night of 20 August, E11's first officer, Lieutenant Guy D'Oyly-Hughes, swam ashore and blew up a section of the Constantinople–Baghdad railway line, a feat for which he was awarded the Distinguished Service Cross. Navigating Officer Lieutenant Robert Brown was also awarded the Distinguished Service Cross. A reservist from the Merchant Navy, Brown had famously been born rounding the Cape Horn on the clipper John Gambles, the sister ship to the more famous Cutty Sark.

E11 made three tours of the Sea of Marmara and sank in total 27 steamers and 58 smaller vessels.

== Bibliography ==
- Barnes C.H. & James D.N (1989). Shorts Aircraft since 1900. London: Putnam. ISBN 0-85177-819-4.
- Langensiepen, Bernd & Güleryüz, Ahmet (1995). The Ottoman Steam Navy 1828–1923. London: Conway Maritime Press. ISBN 978-0-85177-610-1.
- Harris, Mark (2021). Harwich Submarines in the Great War: The first submarine campaign of the Royal Navy in 1914. Warwick: Helion & Company. ISBN 978-1-914059-97-1.
