= SMS Weissenburg =

Battleship of the German Imperial Navy

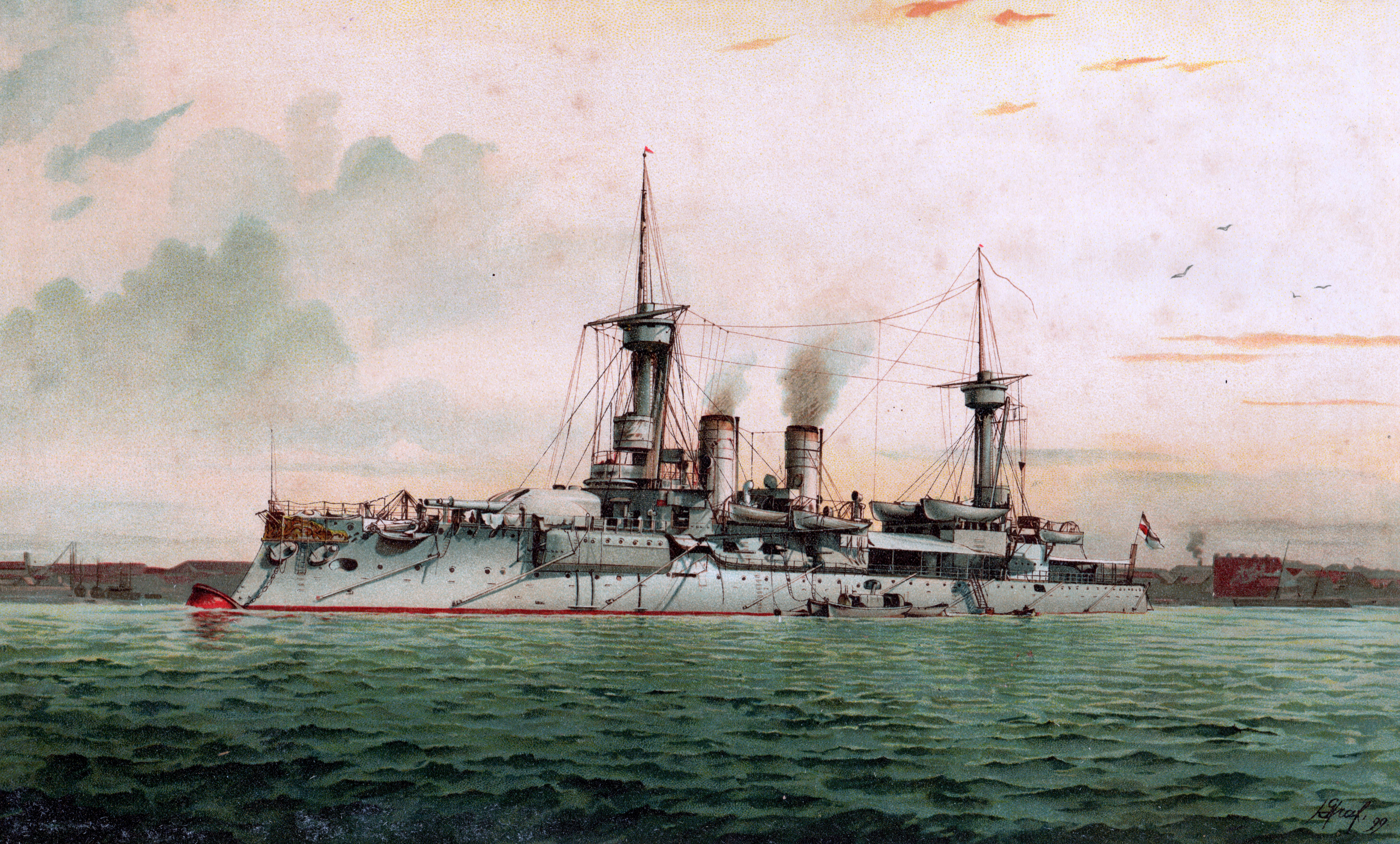
- Lithograph of Weissenburg in 1902

History

German Empire
- Name: Weissenburg
- Namesake: Battle of Weissenburg
- Builder: AG Vulcan Stettin
- Laid down: May 1890
- Launched: 14 December 1891
- Commissioned: 14 October 1894
- Fate: Sold to the Ottoman Empire

History

Ottoman Empire
- Name: Turgut Reis
- Namesake: Turgut Reis
- Acquired: 12 September 1910
- Fate: Broken up, 1950–1957

General characteristics
- Class & type: Brandenburg-class battleship
- Displacement: Normal: 10,013 t (9,855 long tons); Full load: 10,670 t (10,500 long tons)
- Length: 115.7 m (379 ft 7 in) loa
- Beam: 19.5 m (64 ft)
- Draft: 7.9 m (25 ft 11 in)
- Installed power: 12 × Scotch marine boilers; 10,000 metric horsepower (9,900 ihp)
- Propulsion: 2 × screw propellers; 2 × triple-expansion steam engines
- Speed: 16.5 knots (30.6 km/h; 19.0 mph)
- Range: 4,300 nautical miles (8,000 km; 4,900 mi) at 10 knots (19 km/h; 12 mph)
- Complement: 38 officers; 530 enlisted men
- Armament: 4 × 28 cm (11 in) MRK L/40 caliber guns; 2 × 28 cm (11 in) MRK L/35 caliber guns; 8 × 10.5 cm (4.1 in) SK L/35 guns; 8 × 8.8 cm (3.5 in) SK L/30 guns; 3 × 45 cm (18 in) torpedo tubes
- Armor: Belt: 400 mm (15.7 in); Barbettes: 300 mm (11.8 in); Deck: 60 mm (2.4 in)

SMS Weissenburg (Note: "SMS" stands for "Seiner Majestät Schiff", or "His Majesty's Ship" in German.) was one of the first ocean-going battleships of the Imperial German Navy. She was the third pre-dreadnought of the Brandenburg class, which also included her sister ships Brandenburg, Wörth, and Kurfürst Friedrich Wilhelm. Weissenburg was laid down in 1890 in the AG Vulcan dockyard in Stettin, launched in 1891, and completed in 1894. The Brandenburg-class battleships were unique for their era in that they carried six large-caliber guns in three twin turrets, as opposed to four guns in two turrets, as was the standard in other navies.

Weissenburg served with I Division during the first decade of her service with the fleet. This period was generally limited to training exercises and goodwill visits to foreign ports. These training maneuvers were nevertheless very important to developing German naval tactical doctrine in the two decades before World War I, especially under the direction of Alfred von Tirpitz. Weissenburg, along with her three sisters, saw only one major overseas deployment during this period, to China in 1900–1901, during the Boxer Uprising. The ship underwent a major modernization in 1904–1905.

In 1910, Weissenburg was sold to the Ottoman Empire and renamed Turgut Reis, after the famous 16th century Turkish admiral. The ship saw heavy service during the Balkan Wars, primarily providing artillery support to Ottoman ground forces. She also took part in two naval engagements with the Greek Navy—the Battle of Elli in December 1912, and the Battle of Lemnos the following month. Both battles were defeats for the Ottoman Navy. After the Ottoman Empire entered World War I, she supported the fortresses protecting the Dardanelles through mid-1915, and was decommissioned from August 1915 to the end of the war. She served as a training ship from 1924 to 1933, and a barracks ship until 1950, when she was broken up.

== Design ==
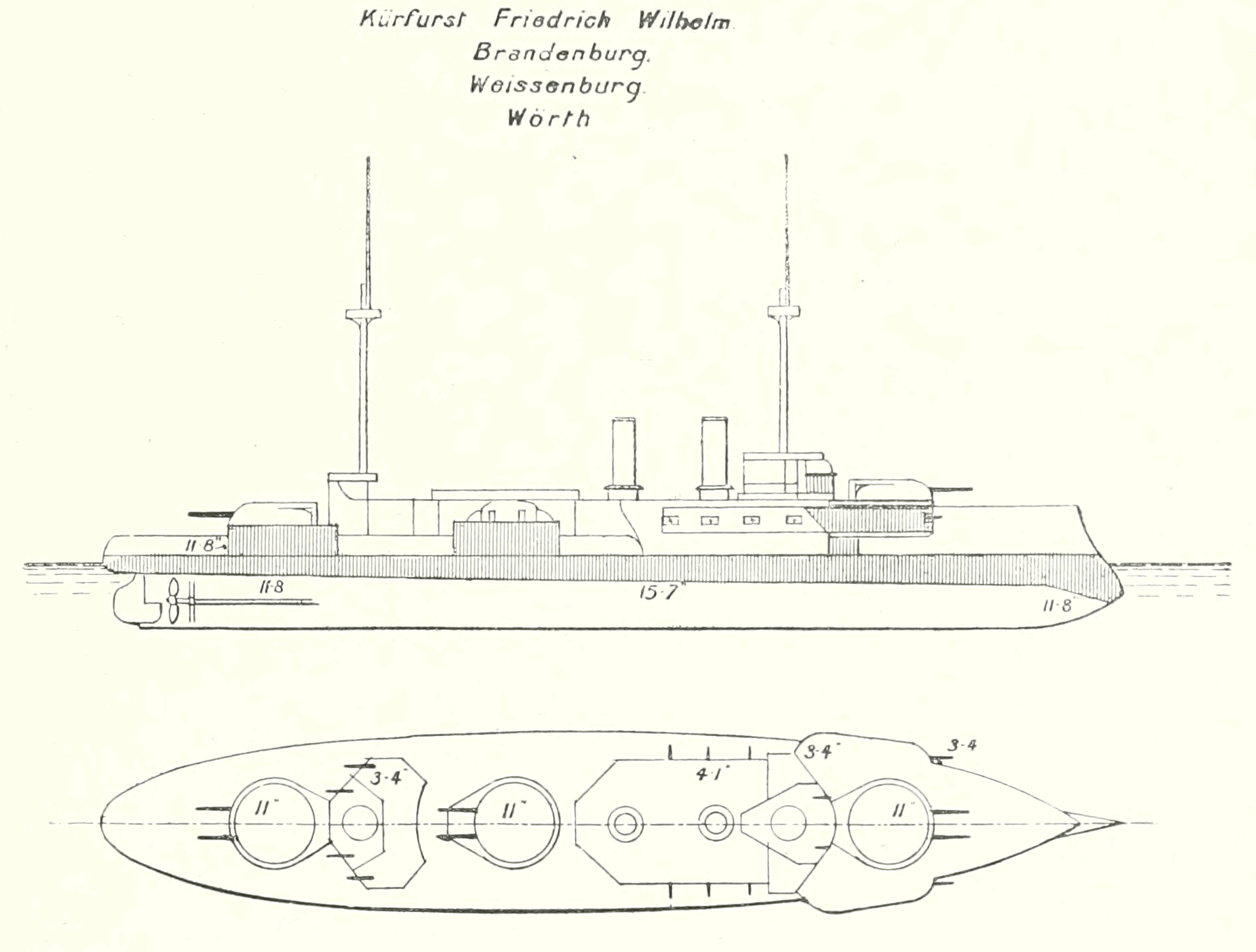
As depicted in Brassey's Naval Annual 1902

Weissenburg was the third of four Brandenburg-class battleships, the first pre-dreadnought battleships of the Kaiserliche Marine (Imperial Navy). Prior to the ascension of Kaiser Wilhelm II to the German throne in June 1888, the German fleet had been largely oriented toward defense of the German coastline and Leo von Caprivi, chief of the Reichsmarineamt (Imperial Naval Office), had ordered a number of coastal defense ships in the 1880s. In August 1888, the Kaiser, who had a strong interest in naval matters, replaced Caprivi with Vizeadmiral (VAdm—Vice Admiral) Alexander von Monts and instructed him to include four battleships in the 1889–1890 naval budget. Monts, who favored a fleet of battleships over the coastal defense strategy emphasized by his predecessor, cancelled the last four coastal defense ships authorized under Caprivi and instead ordered four 10,000-metric-ton (9,800-long-ton; 11,000-short-ton) battleships. Though they were the first modern battleships built in Germany, presaging the Tirpitz-era High Seas Fleet, the authorization for the ships came as part of a construction program that reflected the strategic and tactical confusion of the 1880s caused by the Jeune École (Young School).

Weissenburg, named for the Battle of Weissenburg of 1870, was 115.7 m (379 ft 7 in) long overall, had a beam of 19.5 m (64 ft) which was increased to 19.74 m (64 ft 9 in) with the addition of torpedo nets, and had a draft of 7.6 m (24 ft 11 in) forward and 7.9 m (25 ft 11 in) aft. She displaced 10,013 t (9,855 long tons) as designed and up to 10,670 t (10,500 long tons) at full combat load. She was equipped with two sets of 3-cylinder vertical triple expansion steam engines that each drove a screw propeller. Steam was provided by twelve transverse cylindrical Scotch marine boilers. The ship's propulsion system was rated at 10,000 metric horsepower (9,900 ihp) and a top speed of 16.5 knots (30.6 km/h; 19.0 mph). She had a maximum range of 4,300 nautical miles (8,000 km; 4,900 mi) at a cruising speed of 10 knots (19 km/h; 12 mph). Her crew numbered 38 officers and 530 enlisted men.

The ship was unusual for her time in that she possessed a broadside of six heavy guns in three twin gun turrets, rather than the four-gun main battery typical of contemporary battleships. The forward and after turrets carried 28 cm (11 in) K L/40 guns, (Note: In Imperial German Navy gun nomenclature, "K" stands for Kanone (cannon), while the L/40 denotes the length of the gun. In this case, the L/40 gun is 40 caliber, meaning that the length of the gun barrel is 40 times the bore diameter.) while the amidships turret mounted a pair of 28 cm guns with shorter L/35 barrels. Her secondary armament consisted of eight 10.5 cm (4.1 in) SK L/35 quick-firing guns mounted in casemates and eight 8.8 cm (3.45 in) SK L/30 quick-firing guns, also casemate mounted. Weissenburg's armament system was rounded out with six 45 cm (17.7 in) torpedo tubes, all in above-water swivel mounts. Although the main battery was heavier than other capital ships of the period, the secondary armament was considered weak in comparison to other battleships.

Weissenburg was protected with nickel-steel Krupp armor, a new type of stronger steel. Her main belt armor was 400 millimeters (15.7 in) thick in the central citadel that protected the ammunition magazines and machinery spaces. The deck was 60 mm (2.4 in) thick. The main battery barbettes were protected with 300 mm (11.8 in) thick armor.

== Service history ==
=== In German service ===
==== Construction – 1897 ====
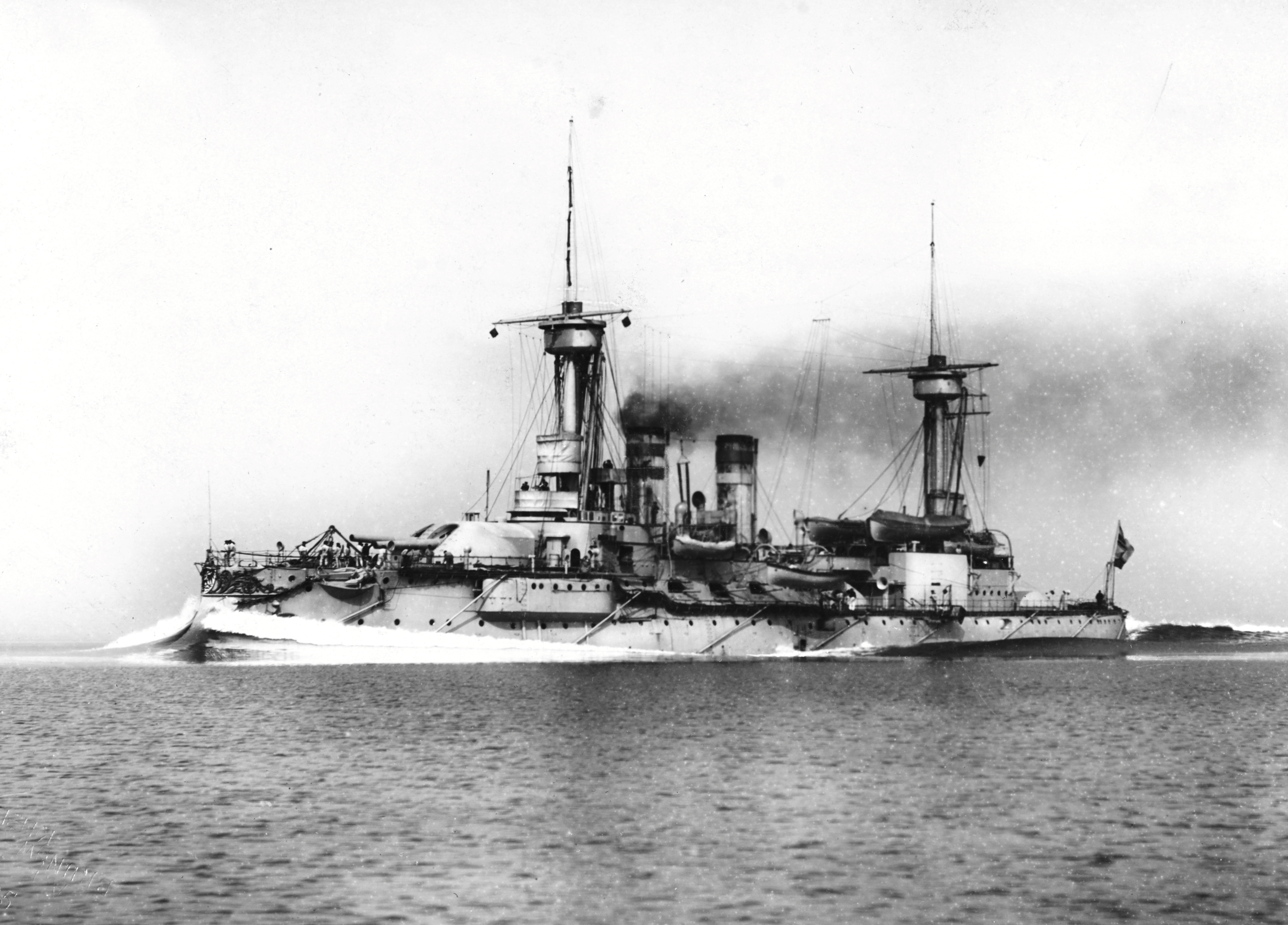
Weissenburg steaming at high speed, probably during her sea trials

Weissenburg was the third of four ships of the Brandenburg class. Ordered as armored ship "C", (Note: German warships were ordered under provisional names. Additions to the fleet were given a single letter; ships intended to replace older or lost vessels were ordered as "Ersatz (name of the ship to be replaced)".) she was laid down at the AG Vulcan shipyard in Stettin in May 1890 under construction number 199. The third ship of the class to be launched, Weissenburg slid down the slipway on 30 June 1891. She was informally commissioned for sea trials on 28 August 1894, which lasted until 24 September. The ship formally entered service on 10 October, under the command of then-Kapitän zur See (Captain at Sea) Wilhelm Büchsel with Korvettenkapitän (Corvette Captain Eduard von Capelle as the executive officer. Weissenburg then underwent further trials, which ended on 12 January 1895, after which she was assigned to I Division of the Maneuver Squadron, where she was initially occupied with individual training. Toward the end of May, more fleet maneuvers were carried out in the North Sea, concluding with a visit by the fleet to Kirkwall in Orkney. The squadron returned to Kiel in early June, where preparations were underway for the opening of the Kaiser Wilhelm Canal. Tactical exercises were carried out in Kiel Bay in the presence of foreign delegations to the opening ceremony.

On 1 July, the German fleet began a major cruise into the Atlantic; on the return voyage in early August, the fleet stopped at the Isle of Wight for the Cowes Regatta. The fleet returned to Wilhelmshaven on 10 August and began preparations for the autumn maneuvers that would begin later that month. The first exercises began in the Helgoland Bight on 25 August. The fleet then steamed through the Skagerrak to the Baltic; heavy storms caused significant damage to many of the ships and the torpedo boat S41 capsized and sank in the storms—only three men were saved. The fleet stayed briefly in Kiel before resuming maneuvers, including live-fire exercises, in the Kattegat and the Great Belt. The main maneuvers began on 7 September with a mock attack from Kiel toward the eastern Baltic. Subsequent maneuvers took place off the coast of Pomerania and in Danzig Bay. A fleet review for Kaiser Wilhelm II off Jershöft concluded the maneuvers on 14 September. The year 1896 followed much the same pattern as the previous year. Individual ship training was conducted through April, followed by squadron training in the North Sea in late April and early May. This included a visit to the Dutch ports of Vlissingen and Nieuwediep. Additional maneuvers, which lasted from the end of May to the end of July, took the squadron further north in the North Sea, frequently into Norwegian waters. The ships visited Bergen from 11 to 18 May. During the maneuvers, Wilhelm II and the Chinese viceroy Li Hongzhang observed a fleet review off Kiel. On 9 August, the training fleet assembled in Wilhelmshaven for the annual autumn fleet training.

Weissenburg and the rest of the fleet operated under the normal routine of individual and unit training in the first half of 1897. The typical routine was interrupted in early August when Wilhelm II and Augusta went to visit the Russian imperial court at Kronstadt; both divisions of I Squadron were sent to accompany the Kaiser. They returned to Neufahrwasser in Danzig on 15 August, where the rest of the fleet joined them for the annual autumn maneuvers. These exercises reflected the tactical thinking of the new State Secretary of the Reichsmarineamt (RMA—Imperial Navy Office), Konteradmiral (KAdm—Rear Admiral) Alfred von Tirpitz, and the new commander of I Squadron, VAdm August von Thomsen. These new tactics stressed accurate gunnery, especially at longer ranges, though the necessities of the line-ahead formation led to tactical rigidity. Thomsen's emphasis on shooting created the basis for the excellent German gunnery during World War I. During the firing exercises, Weissenburg won the Kaiser's Schießpreis (Shooting Prize) for excellent accuracy in I Squadron. On the night of 21–22 August, the torpedo boat D1 accidentally rammed and sank one of Weissenburg's barges, killing two men. The maneuvers were completed by 22 September in Wilhelmshaven. In early December, I Division conducted maneuvers in the Kattegat and the Skagerrak, though they were cut short due to crew shortages.

==== 1898–1900 ====
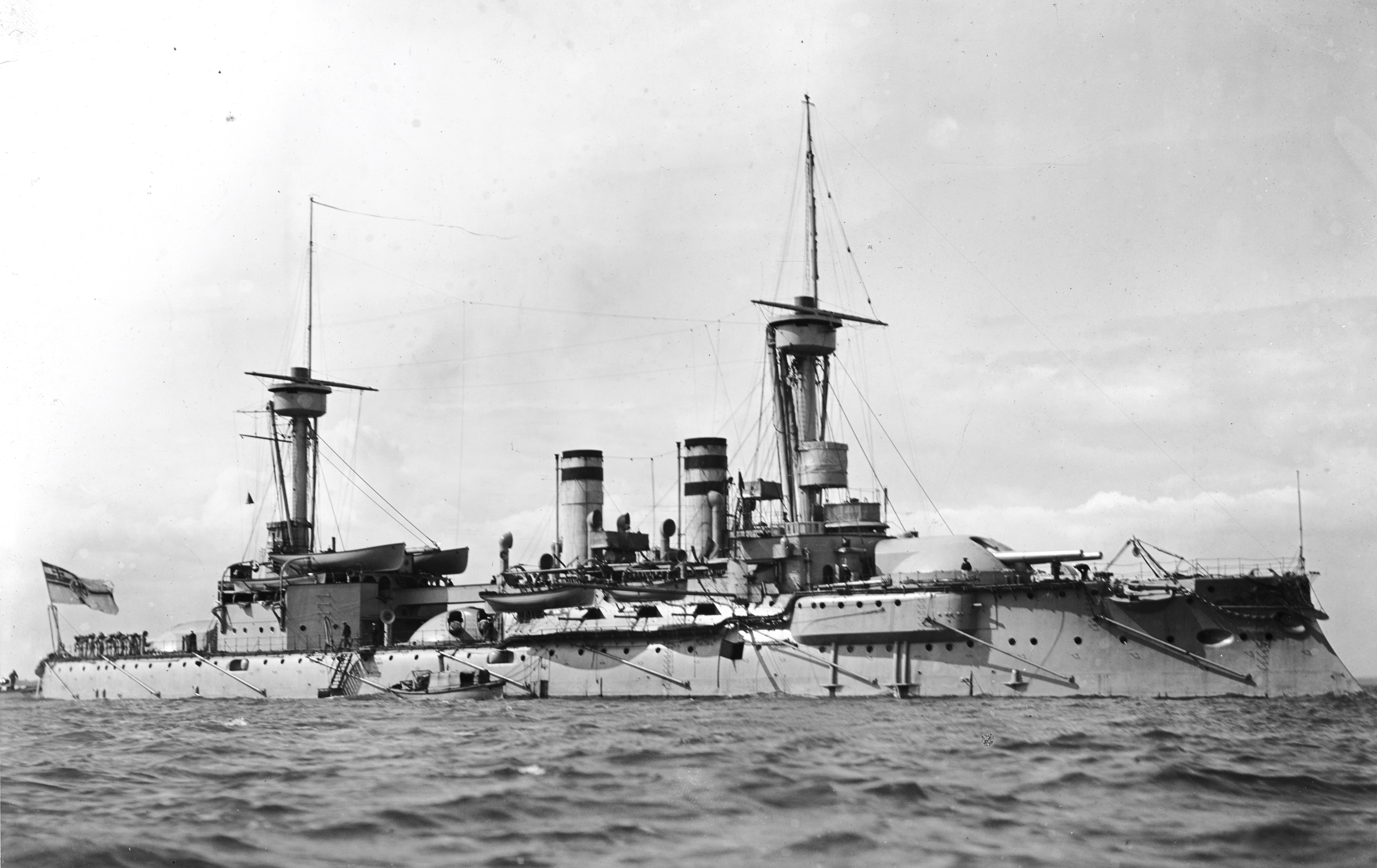
Weissenburg probably early during her career

From 20 to 28 February, Weissenburg briefly served as the divisional flagship. The fleet followed the normal routine of individual and fleet training in 1898 without incident, and a voyage to the British Isles was also included. The fleet stopped in Queenstown, Greenock, and Kirkwall. The fleet assembled in Kiel on 14 August for the annual autumn exercises. The maneuvers included a mock blockade of the coast of Mecklenburg and a pitched battle with an "Eastern Fleet" in the Danzig Bay. A severe storm, striking the fleet as it steamed back to Kiel, caused significant damage to many ships and sank the torpedo boat S58. The fleet then transited the Kaiser Wilhelm Canal and continued maneuvers in the North Sea. Training finished on 17 September in Wilhelmshaven. Weissenburg again won the Kaiser's Schießpreis (Shooting Prize) during the maneuvers. In December, I Division conducted artillery and torpedo training in Eckernförde Bay, followed by divisional training in the Kattegat and Skagerrak. During these maneuvers, the division visited Kungsbacka, Sweden, from 9 to 13 December. After returning to Kiel, the ships of I Division went into dock for their winter repairs.

On 5 April 1899, the ship participated in the celebrations commemorating the 50th anniversary of the Battle of Eckernförde during the First Schleswig War. In May, I and II Divisions, along with the Reserve Division from the Baltic, went on a major cruise into the Atlantic. On the voyage out, I Division stopped in Dover and II Division went into Falmouth to restock their coal supplies. I Division then joined II Division at Falmouth on 8 May, and the two units then departed for the Bay of Biscay, arriving at Lisbon on 12 May. There, they met the British Channel Fleet of eight battleships and four armored cruisers. The German fleet then departed for Germany, stopping again in Dover on 24 May. There they participated in the naval review celebrating Queen Victoria's 80th birthday. The fleet returned to Kiel on 31 May.

In July, the fleet conducted squadron maneuvers in the North Sea, which included coast defense exercises with soldiers from the X Corps. On 16 August, the fleet assembled in Danzig once again for the annual autumn maneuvers. The exercises started in the Baltic and on 30 August the fleet passed through the Kattegat and Skagerrak and steamed into the North Sea for further maneuvers in the German Bight, which lasted until 7 September. The third phase of the maneuvers took place in the Kattegat and the Great Belt from 8 to 26 September, when the maneuvers concluded and the fleet went into port for annual maintenance. The year 1900 began with the usual routine of individual and divisional exercises. In the second half of March, the squadrons met in Kiel, followed by torpedo and gunnery practice in April and a voyage to the eastern Baltic. From 7 to 26 May, the fleet went on a major training cruise to the northern North Sea, which included stops in Shetland from 12 to 15 May and in Bergen from 18 to 22 May. On 8 July, Weissenburg and the other ships of I Division were reassigned to II Division.

==== Boxer Uprising ====
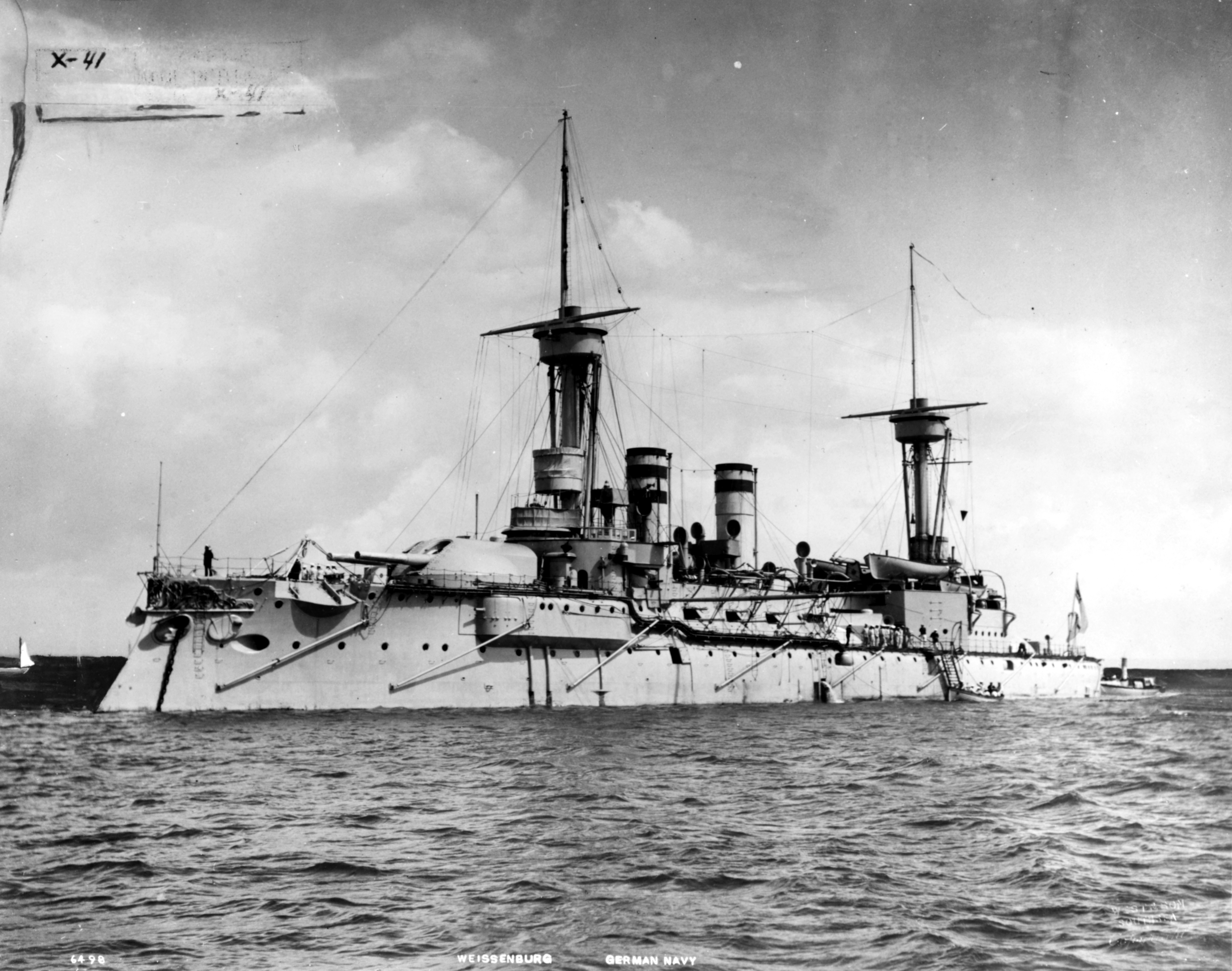
Weissenburg in 1890s

During the Boxer Uprising in 1900, Chinese nationalists laid siege to the foreign embassies in Beijing and murdered Baron Clemens von Ketteler, the German minister. The widespread violence against Westerners in China led to an alliance between Germany and seven other Great Powers: the United Kingdom, Italy, Russia, Austria-Hungary, the United States, France, and Japan. Those Western soldiers in China at the time were too few in number to defeat the Boxers; in Beijing there was a force of slightly more than 400 officers and infantry from the armies of the eight European powers. At the time, the primary German military force in China was the East Asia Squadron, which consisted of the protected cruisers Kaiserin Augusta, Hansa, and Hertha, the small cruisers Irene and Gefion, and the gunboats Jaguar and Iltis. There was also a German 500-man detachment in Taku; combined with the other nations' units, the force numbered some 2,100 men. Led by the British Admiral Edward Seymour, these men attempted to reach Beijing but were forced to stop in Tianjin due to heavy resistance. As a result, the Kaiser determined an expeditionary force would be sent to China to reinforce the East Asia Squadron. The expedition included Weissenburg and her three sisters, six cruisers, ten freighters, three torpedo boats, and six regiments of marines, under the command of Generalfeldmarschall (General Field Marshal) Alfred von Waldersee.

On 7 July, KAdm Richard von Geißler, the expeditionary force commander, reported that his ships were ready for the operation, and they left two days later. The four battleships and the aviso Hela transited the Kaiser Wilhelm Canal and stopped in Wilhelmshaven to rendezvous with the rest of the expeditionary force. On 11 July, the force steamed out of the Jade Bight, bound for China. They stopped for coal at Gibraltar on 17–18 July and passed through the Suez Canal on 26–27 July. More coal was taken on at Perim in the Red Sea, and on 2 August the fleet entered the Indian Ocean. On 10 August, the ships reached Colombo, Ceylon, and on 14 August they passed through the Strait of Malacca. They arrived in Singapore on 18 August and departed five days later, reaching Hong Kong on 28 August. Two days later, the expeditionary force stopped in the outer roadstead at Wusong, downriver from Shanghai. By the time the German fleet had arrived, the siege of Beijing had already been lifted by forces from other members of the Eight-Nation Alliance that had formed to deal with the Boxers.

Since the situation had calmed, the four battleships were sent to either Hong Kong or Nagasaki, Japan, in late 1900 and early 1901 for overhauls; Weissenburg went to Hong Kong, with the work lasting from 6 December 1900 to 3 January 1901. From 8 February to 23 March, she stopped in German Tsingtau, where she also conducted gunnery training. On 26 May, the German high command recalled the expeditionary force to Germany. The fleet took on supplies in Shanghai and departed Chinese waters on 1 June. The ships stopped in Singapore from 10 to 15 June and took on coal before proceeding to Colombo, where they stayed from 22 to 26 June. Steaming against the monsoons forced the fleet to stop in Mahé, Seychelles, to take on more coal. The ships then stopped for a day each to take on coal in Aden and Port Said. On 1 August they reached Cádiz, and then met with I Division and steamed back to Germany together. They separated after reaching Helgoland, and on 11 August, after reaching the Jade roadstead, the ships of the expeditionary force were visited by Koester, who was now the Inspector General of the Navy. The following day the expeditionary fleet was dissolved. In the end, the operation cost the German government more than 100 million marks.

==== 1901–1910 ====
Weissenburg before her reconstruction

Following her return from China, Weissenburg was taken into the drydocks at the Kaiserliche Werft (Imperial Dockyard) in Wilhelmshaven for an overhaul. In late 1901, the fleet went on a cruise to Norway. The pattern of training for 1902 remained unchanged from previous years; I Squadron went on a major training cruise that started on 25 April. The squadron initially steamed to Norwegian waters, then rounded the northern tip of Scotland, and stopped in Irish waters. The ships returned to Kiel on 28 May. Before the start of the annual fleet maneuvers in August, Weissenburg was involved in an accident that damaged her ram bow; to ready the ship for the exercises, wooden reinforcement beams were installed in the bow. After the maneuvers, she was decommissioned on 29 September, with the new battleship Wettin taking her place in the division.

The four Brandenburg-class battleships were taken out of service for a major reconstruction. During the modernization, a second conning tower was added in the aft superstructure, along with a gangway. Weissenburg and the other ships had their boilers replaced with newer models, and also had their superstructure amidships reduced. The work included increasing the ship's coal storage capacity and adding a pair of 10.5 cm guns. The plans had initially called for the center 28 cm turret to be replaced with an armored battery of medium-caliber guns, but this proved to be prohibitively expensive. On 27 September 1904, Weissenburg was recommissioned, and replaced the old coastal defense ship Hildebrand in II Squadron. The two squadrons of the fleet ended the year with the usual training cruise into the Baltic, which took place uneventfully. The first half of 1905 similarly passed without incident for Weissenburg. On 12 July, the fleet began its annual summer cruise to northern waters; the ships stopped in Gothenburg from 20 to 24 July and Stockholm from 2 to 7 August. The trip ended two days later, and was followed by the autumn fleet maneuvers later that month. In December, the fleet took its usual training cruise in the Baltic.

The fleet conducted its normal routine of individual and unit training in 1906, interrupted only by a cruise to Norway from mid-July to early August. The annual autumn maneuvers occurred as usual. After the conclusion of the maneuvers, Weissenburg had her crew reduced on 28 September and she was transferred to the Reserve Formation of the North Sea. She participated in the 1907 fleet maneuvers, but was decommissioned on 27 September, though she was still formally assigned to the Reserve Formation. She was reactivated on 2 August 1910 to participate in the annual maneuvers with III Squadron, though the sale of Weissenburg and Kurfürst Friedrich Wilhelm to the Ottoman Empire was announced just a few days later. On 6 August, she left the squadron and departed Wilhelmshaven on the 14th in company with Kurfürst Friedrich Wilhelm. They arrived in the Ottoman Empire on 1 September.

=== In Ottoman service ===
In late 1909, the German military attache to the Ottoman Empire had begun a conversation with the Ottoman Navy about the possibility of selling German warships to the Ottomans to counter Greek naval expansion. After lengthy negotiations, including Ottoman attempts to buy one or more of the new battlecruisers Von der Tann, Moltke, and Goeben, the Germans offered to sell the four ships of the Brandenburg class at a cost of 10 million marks. The Ottomans chose to buy Weissenburg and Kurfürst Friedrich Wilhelm, since they were the more advanced ships of the class. The two battleships were renamed after the famous 16th-century Ottoman admirals, Turgut Reis and Hayreddin Barbarossa, respectively. They were transferred on 1 September 1910, and on 12 September the German Reichsmarineamt formally struck them from the naval register, backdated to 31 July. The Ottoman Navy, however, had great difficulty equipping Turgut Reis and Barbaros Hayreddin; the navy had to pull trained enlisted men from the rest of the fleet just to put together crews for them. Both vessels suffered from condenser troubles after they entered Ottoman service, which reduced their speed to 8 to 10 knots (15 to 19 km/h; 9 to 12 mph).

==== Italo–Turkish War ====
A year later, on 29 September 1911, Italy declared war on the Ottoman Empire to seize Libya. Turgut Reis, along with Barbaros Hayreddin and the obsolete central battery ironclad Mesudiye had been on a summer training cruise since July, and so were prepared for the conflict. The day before Italy declared war, the ships had left Beirut, bound for the Dardanelles. Unaware that a war had begun, they steamed slowly and conducted training maneuvers while en route, passing southwest of Cyprus. While off the island of Kos on 1 October, the ships received word of the Italian attack, prompting them to steam at full speed for the safety of the Dardanelles, arriving later that night. The following day, the ships proceeded to Constantinople for a refit after the training cruise. Turgut Reis and Barbaros Hayreddin sortied briefly on 4 October, but quickly returned to port without encountering any Italian vessels. During this period, the Italian fleet laid naval mines at the entrance to the Dardanelles in an attempt to prevent the Ottoman fleet from entering the Mediterranean. Maintenance work was completed by 12 October, at which point the fleet returned to Nagara inside the Dardanelles.

Since the fleet could not be used to challenge the significantly more powerful Italian Regia Marina (Royal Navy), Turgut Reis and Barbaros Hayreddin were primarily kept at Nagara to support the coastal fortifications defending the Dardanelles in the event that the Italian fleet attempted to force the straits. On 19 April 1912, elements of the Italian fleet bombarded the Dardanelles fortresses, but the Ottoman fleet did not mount a counterattack. The negative course of the war led many naval officers to join a coup against the Young Turk government; the officers commanding the fleet at Nagara threatened to bring the ships to Constantinople if their demands were not met. With tensions rising in the Balkans, the Ottoman government signed a peace treaty on 18 October, ending the war.

==== Balkan Wars ====
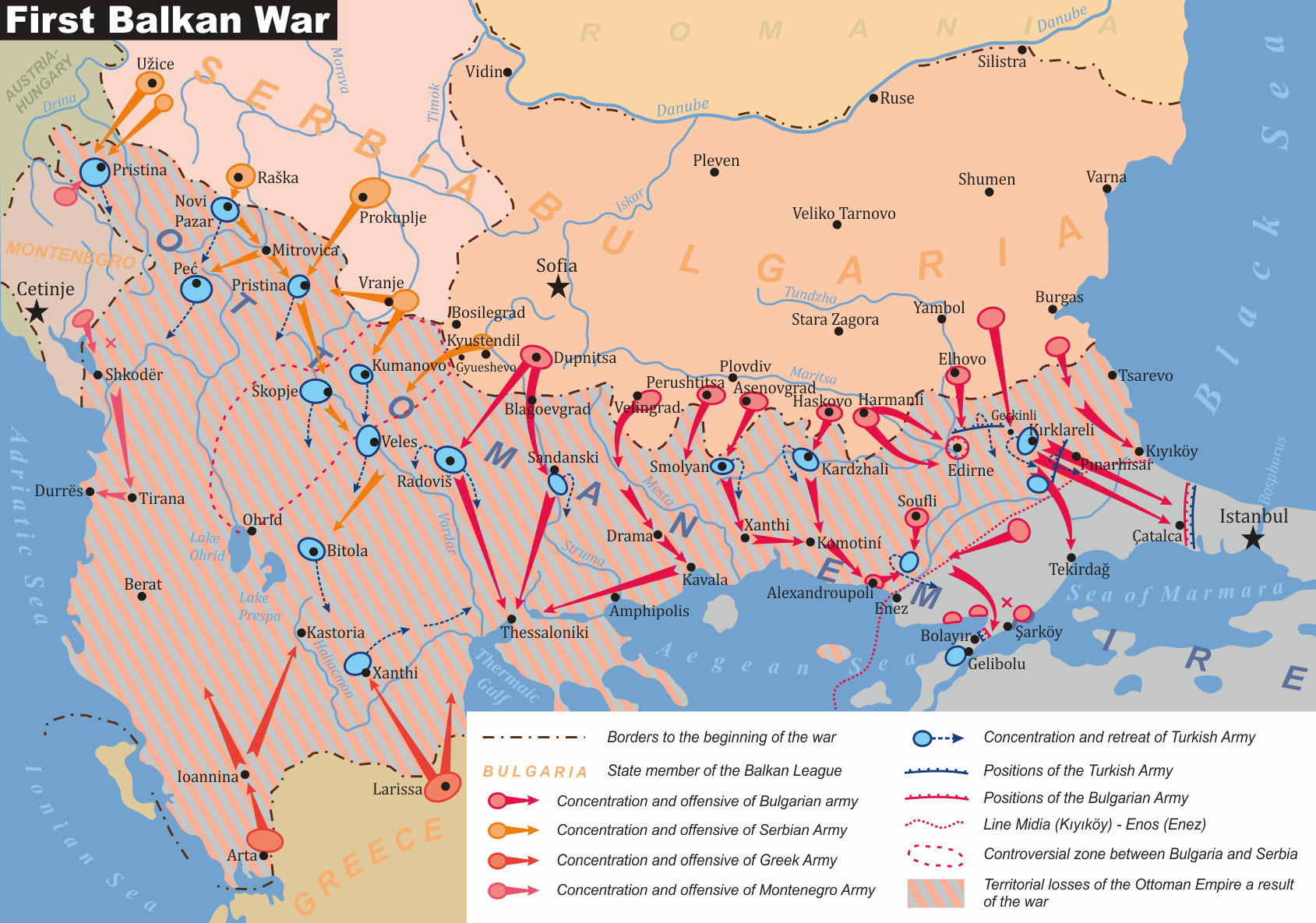
Map showing operations during the First Balkan War

After watching Italy successfully seize Ottoman territory, the Balkan League declared war on the Ottoman Empire in October 1912 to seize the remaining European portion of the Empire, starting the First Balkan War. By this time, Turgut Reis, as with most ships of the Ottoman fleet, was in a state of disrepair. Her rangefinders and ammunition hoists had been removed, the pipes for her pumps were corroded, and the telephone lines no longer worked. On 7 October, the day before the Balkan League attacked, Turgut Reis and Barbaros Hayreddin were anchored off Haydarpaşa, along with the cruisers Hamidiye and Mecidiye and several torpedo boats. Ten days later, the ships departed for İğneada and the two battleships bombarded Bulgarian artillery positions near Varna two days thereafter. The ships were still suffering from boiler trouble. Both battleships took part in gunnery training in the Sea of Marmara on 3 November, but stopped after firing only a few salvos each, as their main battery mountings were not fully functional.

On 7 November, Turgut Reis shelled Bulgarian troops around Tekirdağ. On 17 November, she supported the Ottoman III Corps by bombarding the attacking Bulgarian forces. The ship was aided by artillery observers ashore. The battleship's gunnery was largely ineffective, though it provided a morale boost for the besieged Ottoman army dug in at Çatalca. By 17:00, the Bulgarian infantry had largely been forced back to their starting positions, in part due to the psychological effect of the battleships' bombardment. On 22 November, Turgut Reis sortied from the Bosporus to cover the withdrawal of Hamidiye, which had been torpedoed by a Bulgarian torpedo boat earlier that morning.

===== Battle of Elli =====
In December 1912, the Ottoman fleet was reorganized into an armored division, which included Barbaros Hayreddin as flagship, two destroyer divisions, and a fourth division composed of warships intended for independent operations. Over the next two months, the armored division attempted to break the Greek naval blockade of the Dardanelles, which resulted in two major naval engagements. The first, the Battle of Elli took place on 16 December 1912. The Ottomans attempted to launch an attack on Imbros. The Ottoman fleet sortied from the Dardanelles at 09:30; the smaller craft remained at the mouth of the straits while the battleships sailed north, hugging the coast. The Greek flotilla, which included the armored cruiser Georgios Averof and three Hydra-class ironclads, sailing from the island of Lemnos, altered course to the northeast to block the advance of the Ottoman battleships.

The Ottoman ships opened fire on the Greeks at 09:50, from a range of about 15,000 yd (14,000 m). Five minutes later, Georgios Averof crossed over to the other side of the Ottoman fleet, placing the Ottomans in the unfavorable position of being under fire from both sides. At 09:50 and under heavy pressure from the Greek fleet, the Ottoman ships completed a 16-point turn, which reversed their course, and headed for the safety of the straits. The turn was poorly conducted, and the ships fell out of formation, blocking each other's fields of fire. Around this time, Turgut Reis received several hits, though they inflicted only minor damage to the ship's superstructure and guns. By 10:17, both sides had ceased firing and the Ottoman fleet withdrew into the Dardanelles. The ships reached port by 13:00 and transferred their casualties to the hospital ship Resit Paşa.

===== Battle of Lemnos =====
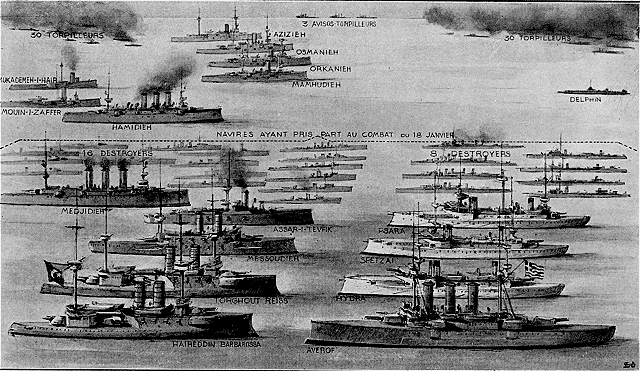
Illustration of the order of battle at the Battle of Lemnos

The Battle of Lemnos resulted from an Ottoman plan to lure the faster Georgios Averof away from the Dardanelles. The protected cruiser Hamidiye evaded the Greek blockade and broke out into the Aegean Sea; the assumption was that the Greeks would dispatch Georgios Averof to hunt down Hamidiye. Despite the threat to Greek lines of communication posed by the cruiser, the Greek commander refused to detach Georgios Averof from its position. By mid-January, the Ottomans had learned that Georgios Averof remained with the Greek fleet, and so Kalyon Kaptanı (Captain) Ramiz Numan Bey, the Ottoman fleet commander, decided to attack the Greeks regardless. Turgut Reis, Barbaros Hayreddin, and other units of the Ottoman fleet departed the Dardanelles at 08:20 on the morning of 18 January, and sailed toward the island of Lemnos at a speed of 11 knots (20 km/h; 13 mph). Barbaros Hayreddin led the line of battleships, with a flotilla of torpedo boats on either side of the formation. Georgios Averof, with the three Hydra-class ironclads and five destroyers trailing behind, intercepted the Ottoman fleet approximately 12 nautical miles (22 km; 14 mi) from Lemnos. At 10:55, Mecidiye spotted the Greeks, and the fleet turned south to engage them.

A long-range artillery duel that lasted for two hours began at around 11:55, when the Ottoman fleet opened fire at a range of 8,000 m (26,000 ft). They concentrated their fire on Georgios Averof, which returned fire at 12:00. At 12:50, the Greeks attempted to cross the T of the Ottoman fleet, but the Ottoman line led by Barbaros Hayreddin turned north to block the Greek maneuver. The Ottoman commander detached the old ironclad Mesudiye after she received a serious hit at 12:55. After Barbaros Hayreddin suffered several hits that reduced her speed to 5 knots (9.3 km/h; 5.8 mph), Turgut Reis took the lead of the formation and Bey decided to break off the engagement. By 14:00, the Ottoman fleet reached the cover of the Dardanelles fortresses, forcing the Greeks to withdraw. Between Turgut Reis and Barbaros Hayreddin, the ships fired some 800 rounds, mostly of their main battery 28 cm guns but without success. During the battle, barbettes on both Turgut Reis and her sister were disabled by gunfire, and both ships caught fire.

===== Subsequent operations =====
On 8 February 1913, the Ottoman navy supported an amphibious assault at Şarköy. Turgut Reis and Barbaros Hayreddin, along with two small cruisers provided artillery support to the right flank of the invading force once it went ashore. The ships were positioned about a kilometer off shore; Turgut Reis was the second ship in the line, behind her sister Barbaros Hayreddin. The Bulgarian army resisted fiercely, which ultimately forced the Ottoman army to retreat, though the withdrawal was successful in large part due to the gunfire support from Turgut Reis and the rest of the fleet. During the battle, Turgut Reis fired 225 rounds from her 10.5 cm guns and 202 shells from her 8.8 cm guns.

In March 1913, the ship returned to the Black Sea to resume support of the Çatalca garrison, which was under renewed attacks by the Bulgarian army. On 26 March, the barrage of 28 and 10.5 cm shells fired by Turgut Reis and Barbaros Hayreddin assisted in the repelling of advance of the 2nd Brigade of the Bulgarian 1st Infantry Division. On 30 March, the left wing of the Ottoman line turned to pursue the retreating Bulgarians. Their advance was supported by both field artillery and the heavy guns of Turgut Reis and the other warships positioned off the coast; the assault gained the Ottomans about 1,500 m (4,900 ft) by nightfall. In response, the Bulgarians brought the 1st Brigade to the front, which beat the Ottoman advance back to its starting position. On 11 April, Turgut Reis and Barbaros Hayreddin, supported by several smaller vessels, steamed to Çanakkale to provide distant cover for a light flotilla conducting a sweep for Greek warships. The two sides clashed in an inconclusive engagement, and the main Ottoman fleet did not sortie before the two sides disengaged.

==== World War I ====
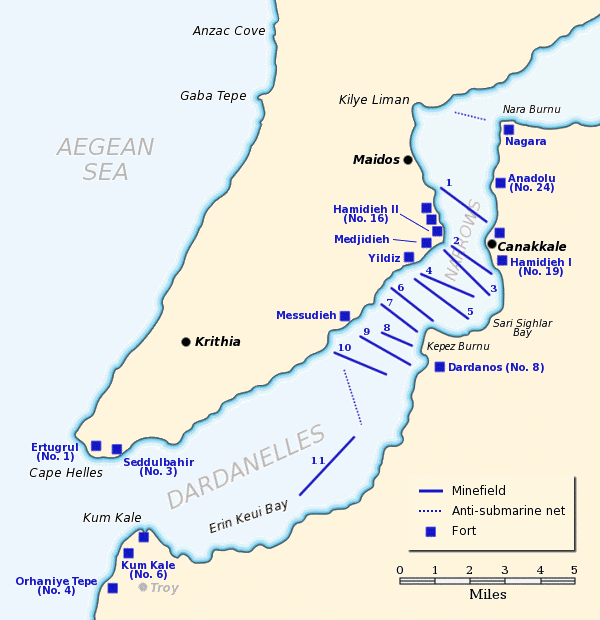
Map showing the Ottoman defenses at the Dardanelles in 1915

In the summer of 1914, when World War I broke out in Europe, the Ottomans initially remained neutral. In early November, the Black Sea Raid of the German battlecruiser Goeben, which had been transferred to the Ottoman navy and renamed Yavuz Sultan Selim, resulted in declarations of war by Russia, France, and Great Britain. By this time, Turgut Reis was laid up off the Golden Horn, worn out from heavy service during the Balkan Wars. Admiral Guido von Usedom, the head of the German naval mission to the Ottoman Empire, sent her and Barbaros Hayreddin to Nagara to support the Dardanelles forts. They remained on station from 14 to 19 December, before returning to Constantinople for repairs and gunnery training. On 18 February 1915, they departed for the Dardanelles and anchored in their firing positions. During this period, their engines were stopped to preserve fuel, but after the threat of British submarines increased, they kept steam up in their engines to preserve their ability to take evasive action; the steamer Üsküdar was moored in front of the battleships as a floating barrage. By 11 March, the high command decided that only one ship should be kept on station at a time, alternating every five days, to allow the ships to replenish stores and ammunition.

On 18 March, Turgut Reis was on station when the Allies attempted to force the straits. She did not engage the Allied ships, as her orders were to open fire only in the event that the defenses were breached. This was in part due to a severe shortage of shells. On 25 April, both Turgut Reis and Barbaros Hayreddin were present to bombard the Allied troops that had landed at Gallipoli that day. At 07:30 that morning, the Australian submarine HMAS AE2 fired several torpedoes at Turgut Reis but failed to score any hits. Turgut Reis returned to Constantinople later that day as planned. While she was bombarding Allied positions on 5 June, one of Turgut Reis's forward guns exploded; four men were killed and thirty-two were wounded. She returned to Constantinople for repairs, and the navy suspended bombardment operations—Barbaros Hayreddin having suffered a similar accident on 25 April. On 12 August, Turgut Reis was laid up at the Golden Horn after Barbaros Hayreddin was torpedoed and sunk by a British submarine. At some point in 1915, some of Turgut Reis's guns were removed and employed as coastal guns to shore up the defenses protecting the Dardanelles.

On 19 January 1918, Yavuz and the light cruiser SMS Breslau, which had also been transferred to Ottoman service under the name Midilli, sailed from the Dardanelles to attack several British monitors stationed outside. The ships quickly sank HMS Raglan and HMS M28 before turning back to the safety of the Dardanelles. While en route, Midilli struck five mines and sank, while Yavuz hit three mines and began to list to port. The ship's captain gave an incorrect order to the helmsman, which caused the ship to run aground. Yavuz remained there for almost a week, until Turgut Reis and several other vessels arrived on the scene on 22 January; the ships spent four days trying to free Yavuz from the sand bank, including using the turbulence from their propellers to clear sand away from under the ship. By the morning of 26 January, Yavuz came free from the sandbank and Turgut Reis escorted her back into the Dardanelles.

Turgut Reis was laid up again on 30 October 1918, and was refitted at the Gölcük Naval Shipyard from 1924 to 1925. After returning to service, she served as a stationary training ship based at Gölcük. At the time, she retained only two of her originally six 28 cm guns. Two main turrets were removed and installed as a part of the heavy coastal battery Turgut Reis, situated at the Asian coast of the Dardanelles Strait. Both turrets are preserved with their guns (two L/40 and two L/35). She was decommissioned in 1933 and was thereafter used as a barracks ship for dockyard workers, a role she filled until 1950, when she began to be broken up at Gölcük. By 1953, the ship had been broken down into two sections, and these were sold to be dismantled abroad. Demolition work was finally completed between 1956 and 1957.
