= Battle of Imbros =

World War I naval battle

Coordinates: 40°14′N 25°58′E

- Part of the Mediterranean Theatre of World War I
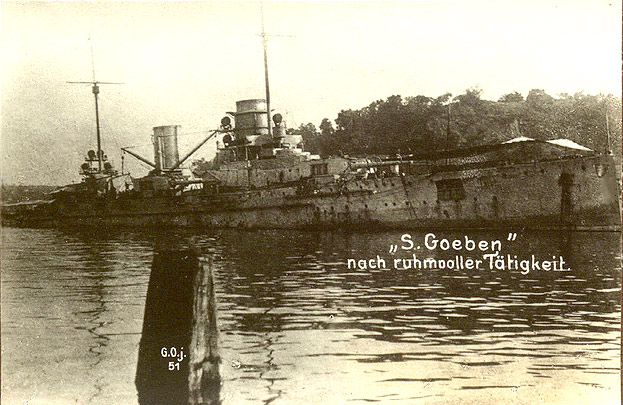
- Yavûz Sultân Selîm beached in the Dardanelles
Date	20 January 1918
Location	Off Imbros, Aegean Sea
Result	Allied victory

Belligerents
British Empire; Kingdom of Greece	Ottoman Empire; German Empire

Commanders and leaders
Henry F. Kitchener (Kingdom of Greece) Aristeidis Moraitinis	Hubert Paschwitz

Strength
2 monitors 2 destroyers 12 aircraft	1 battlecruiser 1 light cruiser 1 protected cruiser 4 destroyers 10 aircraft

Casualties and losses
139 killed 2 monitors sunk 1 aircraft destroyed 1 aircraft damaged	330 killed 172 captured 1 light cruiser sunk 1 battlecruiser disabled 1 destroyer damaged 3 aircraft destroyed

The Battle of Imbros was a naval action that took place during the First World War. The battle occurred on 20 January 1918 when an Ottoman squadron engaged a flotilla of the British Royal Navy off the island of Imbros in the Aegean Sea. A lack of heavy Allied warships in the area allowed the Ottoman battlecruiser Yavuz Sultan Selim and light cruiser Midilli to sortie into the Mediterranean and attack the Royal Navy monitors and destroyers at Imbros before assaulting the naval base at Mudros.

Although the Ottoman forces managed to complete their objective of destroying the monitors located at Imbros, the battle turned sour for them as they sailed through a minefield while withdrawing. Midilli was sunk and Yavuz Sultan Selim heavily damaged. Although Yavûz Sultân Selîm managed to beach herself within the Dardanelles, she was subjected to days of air attacks until she was towed to safety. With the most modern cruiser of the Ottoman Navy sunk, and its only battlecruiser out of action, the battle effectively curtailed the Ottoman Navy's offensive capability until the end of the war.

== Prelude ==
By January 1918, the situation for the Ottoman Army in Palestine had begun to worsen. The new German commander of the Ottoman Black Sea fleet, Rebeur Paschwitz, decided to try to relieve Allied naval pressure on Palestine by making a sortie out of the Dardanelles. Several British naval elements of the Aegean Squadron had been taking refuge in Kusu Bay off the islands of Imbros, and they were a prime target for an Ottoman raid. After raiding what shipping could be found at Imbros, Rebeur-Paschwitz planned to proceed to Mudros and attack the British naval base there. The Allied force guarding the Dardanelles consisted of a few heavy British and French units as well as several monitors tasked with coastal bombardment. Escorting the monitors were several British destroyers. The pre-dreadnought battleships HMS Agamemnon and HMS Lord Nelson were also tasked with guarding the area, but the Lord Nelson had been tasked with ferrying the squadron's admiral to a conference at Salonika. Taking advantage of the absence of the British battleship, the Germans and Ottomans decided to dispatch the battlecruiser Yavûz Sultân Selîm (ex-SMS Goeben) and the light cruiser Midilli (ex-SMS Breslau) to attack the area. The Allied forces at Imbros on 20 January consisted of the monitors HMS Raglan and HMS M28 as well as the Acheron-class destroyers HMS Tigress and HMS Lizard. Agamemnon was nearby at Mudros, but she was much too slow to chase down the Ottoman ships if they wanted to avoid engaging her.

Without Agamemnon and Lord Nelson the British were severely outgunned by the Ottoman ships. Tigress and Lizard were each armed with two 4-inch guns, two 12 pounders, and two 21-inch torpedo tubes. They were swift ships capable of making 27 knots (50 km/h) at best speed. The two monitors present at Imbros were better suited for coastal bombardment than naval combat, though their heavy guns gave them an element of firepower the destroyers lacked. Raglan, an Abercrombie-class monitor, was armed with two 14-inch guns, two 6-inch guns, and two 3-inch guns. M28 was a smaller vessel than Raglan and carried a lighter armament: a single 9.2-inch gun, one 12-pounder, and a six-pounder anti-aircraft gun. The weak point of both Raglan and M28 were their low top speeds of 7 and 11 knots (13 and 20 km/h; 8.1 and 12.7 mph) respectively, giving them little capability of escaping an Ottoman raid. In contrast to the British force, the Ottoman vessels were both fast and heavily armed. Midilli carried eight 150 mm guns, 120 mines, two torpedo tubes, and a top speed of 25 knots (46 km/h; 29 mph). Yavûz Sultân Selîm was the most powerful ship in the Ottoman fleet with a top speed of 25.5 knots, ten 283 mm guns, twelve 150 mm guns, a dozen 88 mm guns, and four torpedo tubes. With no heavy units available to repel them, there was little in the means of effective Allied opposition when the Ottomans set out on their mission.

== Battle ==
Setting out towards Imbros, Yavuz Sultan Selim struck a mine on transit to the island, but the damage was insignificant and the two Ottoman vessels were able to continue their mission. Yavuz Sultan Selim then proceeded to bombard the British signal station at Kephalo Point while Midilli was sent ahead to guard the entrance of Kusu Bay. As Yavûz Sultân Selîm and Midilli approached Kusu Bay, they were sighted by the destroyer HMS Lizard at 5:30 am. Lizard attempted to engage the Ottoman ships, but could not close to torpedo range due to heavy fire from her opponents. Yavuz Sultan Selim soon sighted the two British monitors taking refuge in the bay, and broke off from Lizard to engage them. As Yavuz Sultan Selim attacked the monitors, Midilli continued to duel with Lizard, which was then joined by the destroyer HMS Tigress. Lizard and Tigress attempted to shield the monitors from Yavuz Sultan Selim by laying a smoke screen, but this was ineffective. The monitors were both much too slow to evade Yavûz Sultân Selîm and she was able to score numerous hits on Raglan, hitting her foretop and killing her gunnery and direction officers. Raglan attempted to return fire with her 6- and 14-inch guns, but scored no hits on the German vessels before her main armament was knocked out when a shell pierced its casemate and ignited the ammunition within it. Shortly after she was disarmed, Raglan was hit in her magazine by one of Yavuz Sultan Selim's 11-inch shells and sank. The Ottoman battlecruiser then turned her attention to HMS M28, striking her amidships and setting her alight before she was sunk when her magazine exploded at 6:00 am. With the two monitors sunk, the Ottomans decided to break off the engagement and head south in an attempt to raid the allied naval base at Mudros. In the meantime, Yavuz Sultan Selim also shelled and set on fire the aviation fuel depots in Kusu with her secondary armament, while Midilli sank two freighters at anchor in the bay.

Upon withdrawing from Kusu Bay, the Ottoman force accidentally sailed into a minefield and were shadowed by the two British destroyers they had previously engaged. In addition to the destroyers, several British and Greek aircraft were launched from Mudros to engage the Germans. Greek ace Aristeidis Moraitinis, escorting two Sopwith Baby seaplanes, fought ten enemy aircraft and shot down three enemy seaplanes with his Sopwith Camel. With the approach of enemy aircraft Midilli, which had been following Yavuz Sultan Selim, took the lead so as to take advantage of her heavier anti-aircraft armament. Midilli then struck a mine near her aft funnel, and shortly afterwards Yavûz Sultân Selîm hit another. Within half an hour Midilli had struck four more mines and began to sink. Yavuz Sultan Selim attempted to rescue Midilli but also struck a mine and was forced to withdraw. Fleeing towards the safety of the Dardanelles, Yavuz Sultan Selim was pursued by Lizard and Tigress. In order to cover Yavûz Sultân Selîm four Ottoman destroyers and an old cruiser rushed out to engage the British destroyers. After the lead Ottoman destroyer began to take hits, the Ottoman squadron was forced to withdraw back up the Dardanelles. As the British destroyers approached Cape Helles, they were fired upon by Ottoman shore batteries and withdrew.

In addition to Lizard and Tigress, a dozen British seaplanes from Ark Royal were launched intending to finish off Yavûz Sultân Selîm. Although they managed to score two hits against the battlecruiser, the Ottoman ship was by this time near the coast. The combined efforts from ten Ottoman seaplanes as well as heavy anti-aircraft fire were able to drive off the air attacks, shooting down one Sopwith Baby and damaging another aircraft. The four Ottoman destroyers returned and guarded Yavuz Sultan Selim as she sailed up the Dardnelles. Severely damaged, the Ottoman battlecruiser ran aground on a sandbar off Nagara Point and became stranded. For the next six days Allied seaplanes further attacked the Ottoman battlecruiser, scoring six hits. Ottoman seaplanes and heavy shore batteries responded to the raids and were able to guard Yavuz Sultan Selim and beat back the air attacks. Despite the air raids, Yavûz Sultân Selîm suffered only superficial damage from them as the 65-pound (29 kg) bombs used by the British were too small to be effective. Allied commanders proposed plans for a submarine raid against the battlecruiser, but the only submarine attached to the Aegean squadron, HMS E12, was inoperative due to mechanical problems. A raid into the Dardanelles was therefore postponed until a working submarine could be dispatched to the area.

== Aftermath ==
With no way to free herself, Yavuz Sultan Selim remained stranded on the sandbar until 26 January when the Ottoman battleship Turgut Reis finally arrived and towed her back into the Black Sea. In one last effort to destroy the battlecruiser, the British sent the submarine HMS E14 into the Dardanelles on 27 January. Yavûz Sultân Selîm had already left the area, and so E14 began sailing back to Allied waters after discovering the battlecruiser's absence. Sighting an Ottoman freighter, the British submarine attempted to torpedo her. The second torpedo fired exploded prematurely, damaging the submarine and forcing her to try to flee the straits. She came under heavy fire from nearby Ottoman shore batteries and was eventually beached with her commander, Geoffrey Saxton White, and another sailor killed and seven captured. White was posthumously awarded the Victoria Cross for his efforts to beach the submarine and save her crew.

Although the Ottoman force destroyed the two monitors as planned, with Midilli sunk and Yavuz Sultan Selim severely damaged the threat of the Ottoman Navy to the Allies was greatly reduced for the remainder of the war. The commanders of the British Aegean Squadron were criticized for sending their battleships so far from the Dardanelles; had either Agamemnon or Lord Nelson been nearby during the Ottoman raid, Yavuz Sultan Selim might have been destroyed.
