= HMS Lizard (1911) =

Destroyer of the Royal Navy

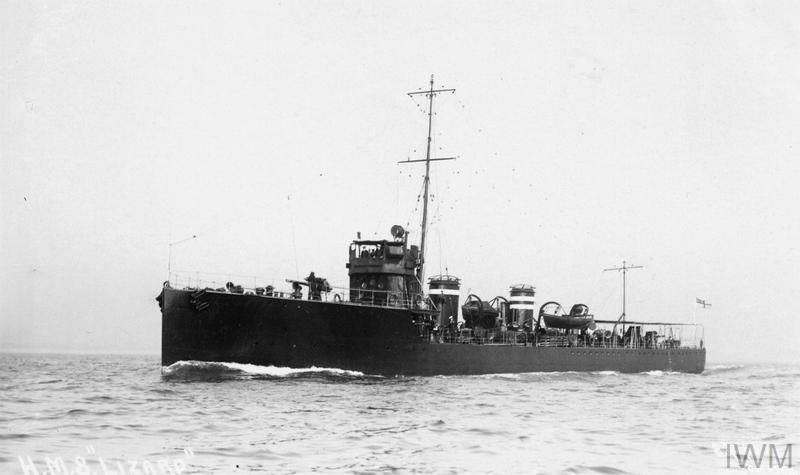
- HMS Lizard

History

United Kingdom
- Name: HMS Lizard
- Builder: Cammell Laird and Company of Birkenhead
- Laid down: 1 January 1911
- Launched: 10 October 1911
- Fate: Sold 4 November 1921

General characteristics
- Class & type: Acheron-class destroyer
- Displacement: 990 tons
- Length: 75 m (246 ft)
- Beam: 7.8 m (26 ft)
- Draught: 2.7 m (8.9 ft)
- Propulsion: Three shaft Parsons Turbines; Three Yarrow boilers (oil fired); 13,500 shp
- Speed: 28 knots (52 km/h)
- Complement: 72
- Armament: 2 × BL 4-inch (101.6 mm) L/40 Mark VIII guns, mounting P Mark V; 2 × QF 12 pounder 12 cwt naval gun, mounting P Mark I; 2 × single tubes for 21 inch (533 mm) torpedoes

HMS Lizard was an Acheron-class destroyer of the British Royal Navy. She is named for the Lizard peninsula in the county of Cornwall in England. and was the twelfth ship of the Royal Navy to bear the name.

== Pennant numbers ==
| Pennant Number | From | To |
|---|---|---|
| H58 | 6 December 1914 | 1 January 1918 |
| H60 | 1 January 1918 | Early 1919 |
| H62 | Early 1919 | 4 November 1921 |

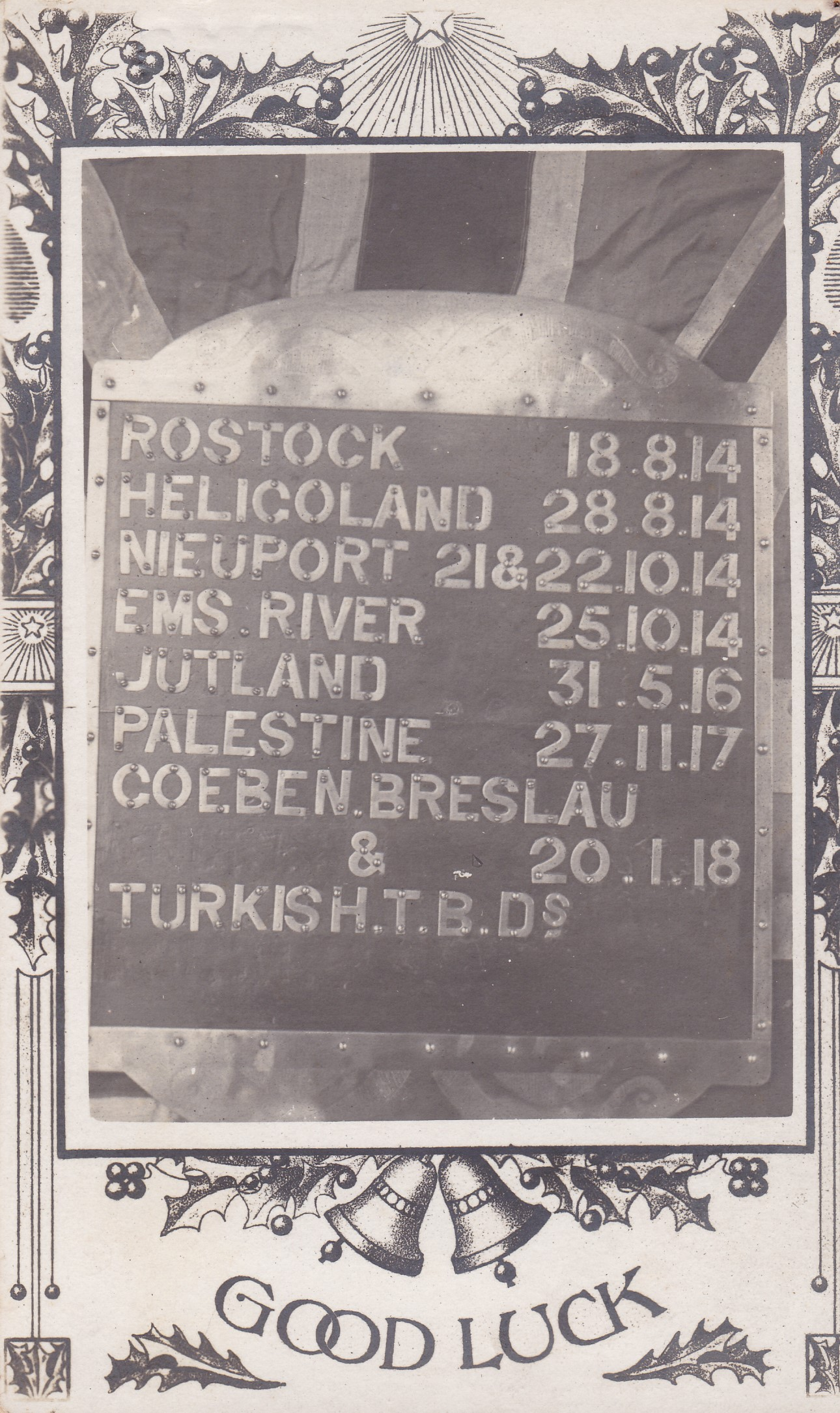
Battle Plate

== Construction ==
Lizard was laid down on 1 January 1911 during the building programme of 1910–11 by Cammell Laird and Company of Birkenhead. She was launched on 10 October 1911. She had two funnels, each with red and white funnel bands. Capable of 28 knots (52 km/h), she carried two 4-inch (102 mm) guns, other smaller guns and 21 inch (533 mm) torpedo tubes and had a complement of 72 men.

== Operational history ==
=== The Battle of Heligoland Bight ===
She was present with First Destroyer Flotilla on 28 August 1914 at the Battle of Heligoland Bight, led by the light cruiser Fearless.

=== Battle of Jutland ===
Lizard took part in the Battle of Jutland as part of the First Destroyer Flotilla. She survived the battle unscathed and with no known casualties.

=== Goeben and Breslau ===
On 19 January 1918 the two German-Turkish ships SMS Breslau and Goeben passed through the Dardanelles to the Aegean. The two ships were shadowed by a Royal Navy flotilla that was stationed there to intercept them, of which Lizard was a part, along with Raglan, M28 and Tigress. The German ships outgunned their opposition, sinking the two monitors, M28 and Raglan, but subsequently ran into a minefield. Breslau struck a mine and sank immediately, with the loss of 330 men. Goeben was damaged but managed to escape. Prior to this she had taken part in the 1917, Battle of Jaffa.

=== Otranto Barrage ===
During April 1918, as part of the 1918 Naval campaign in the Adriatic, Lizard was deployed to the Corfu division of the Otranto Barrage destroyer patrol.

== Disposal ==
Lizard was sold on 4 November 1921 to Rees of Llanelli for breaking.
