= HMS Tigress (1911) =

Destroyer of the Royal Navy

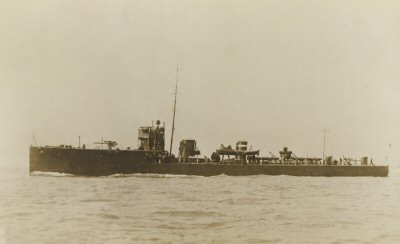
- HMS Tigress during World War I

History

United Kingdom
- Name: HMS Tigress
- Builder: R. W. Hawthorn Leslie & Company, Hebburn
- Launched: 20 December 1911
- Fate: Sold 9 May 1921

General characteristics
- Class & type: Acheron-class destroyer
- Displacement: 770 tons
- Length: 75 m (246 ft)
- Beam: 7.8 m (26 ft)
- Draught: 2.7 m (8.9 ft)
- Propulsion: Three shaft Parsons Turbines; Three Yarrow boilers (oil fired); 13,500 shp
- Speed: 27 kn (50 km/h)
- Complement: 72
- Armament: 2 × BL 4-inch (101.6 mm) L/40 Mark VIII guns, mounting P Mark V; 2 × QF 12 pounder 12 cwt naval gun, mounting P Mark I; 2 × single tubes for 21 inch (533 mm) torpedoes

HMS Tigress was an Acheron-class destroyer of the Royal Navy that served during World War I. She was built under the 1910–11 shipbuilding programme by R. W. Hawthorn Leslie & Company of Hebburn, was launched on 20 December 1911 and was sold for breaking on 9 May 1921.

== Pennant numbers ==
Pennant Number	From	To
H92	6 December 1914	1 January 1918
H4A	1 January 1918	Early 1919
H61	Early 1919	9 May 1921

== Operational history ==
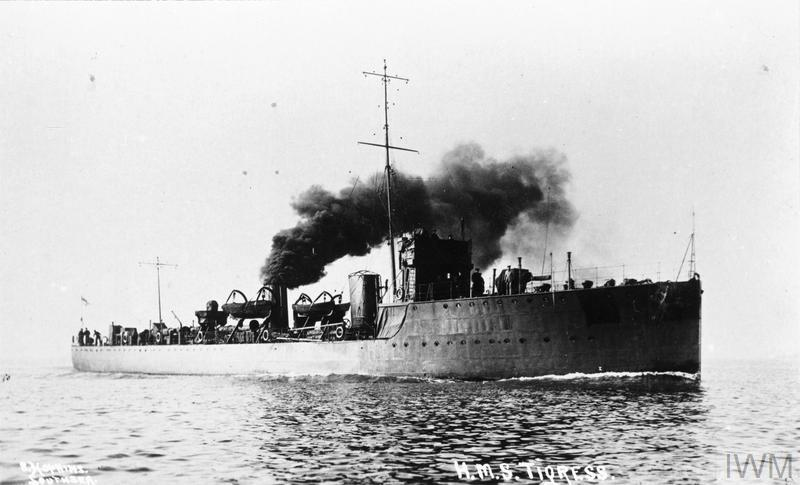
Tigress

In March 1913, Tigress was part of the First Destroyer Flotilla, and remained as part of the First Flotilla in August 1914, on the eve of the outbreak of the First World War. On the outbreak of the war, the 1st Destroyer Flotilla joined the Harwich Force, which, while nominally part of the Grand Fleet was based at Harwich from where it could reinforce the Grand Fleet or forces in the English Channel as required.

=== Battle of Dogger Bank ===
On 24 January 1915, she was present at the Battle of Dogger Bank with the First Destroyer Flotilla.

=== Mediterranean service ===
In late 1917 Tigress was sent to join the Fifth Destroyer Flotilla, operating in the Mediterranean.

=== Pursuit of Goeben and Breslau ===
On 19 January 1918, the two German-Turkish ships SMS Breslau and Goeben passed through the Dardanelles to the Aegean. The two ships were shadowed by a Royal Navy flotilla that was stationed there to intercept them, of which Tigress was a part, along with HM Ships Raglan, M28, and Lizard. The German ships outgunned their opposition, sinking the two monitors, M28 and Raglan, but subsequently ran into a minefield. Breslau struck a mine and sank immediately, with the loss of 330 men. Goeben was damaged but managed to escape. The Captain of the Tigress Lt Cdr J B Newill was awarded the DSO for this action. his citation read:

For the great skill and gallantry displayed by him in handling his ship in the presence of a greatly superior enemy force and under heavy fire. He performed most efficiently his main duty of shadowing the enemy and reporting his movements. He proceeded into the minefield to engage a superior force of enemy destroyers and drove them back to their base. He again entered the minefield at great risk to his ship, and gallantly rescued 162 survivors of the "Breslau" whilst still being fired on from shore batteries.

=== Entry of the Allied Fleet through the Dardanelles ===
Tigress was present at the entry of the Allied Fleet through the Dardanelles on 12 November 1918. The Fleet sighted the minarets of Constantinople at 07:00 on 13 November and anchored an hour later. The destroyers maintained an anti-submarine patrol to the west of the anchored fleet.

=== Disposal ===
Tigress was sold on 9 May 1921 to Ward of Milford Haven, Wales for breaking.
