= Mediterranean Division =

Mediterranean Division Mittelmeerdivision
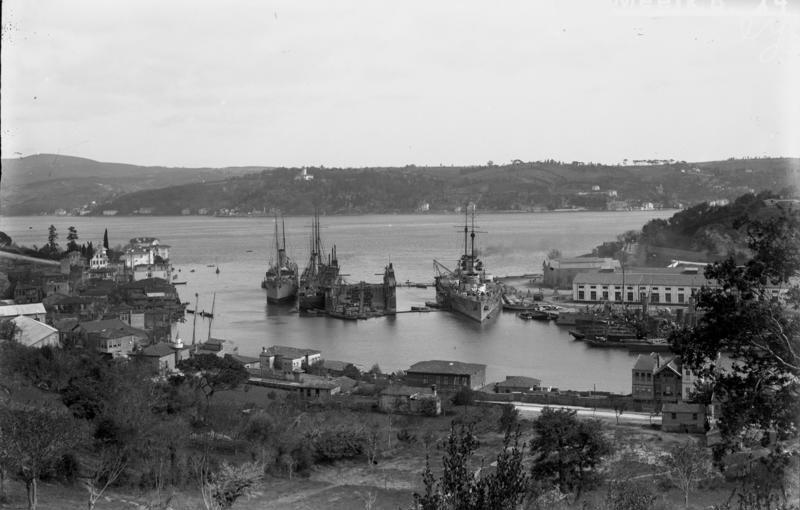
- The battlecruiser Goeben after arriving in the Bosporus.
- Active: 1912 – 2 November 1918
- Disbanded: 2 November 1918
- Country: German Empire
- Branch: Imperial German Navy
- Type: Naval fleet
- Size: 2 ships + SMS Lorely
- Engagements: Pursuit of Goeben and Breslau(4 – 10 August 1914), Battle of Imbros (20 January 1918)

Commanders
- First commander (3 September 1914- 24 August 1917): Wilhlem Souchon
- Second and Last commander (24 August 1917- 3 November 1918): Hubert von Rebeur-Paschwitz

The Mediterranean Division (German: Mittelmeerdivision) was a division of the German Kaiserliche Marine (Imperial Navy) in the early 1910s. Consisting of the battlecruiser SMS Goeben and the light cruiser SMS Breslau, it was established in response to the First Balkan War and saw action during the First World War. It was disbanded after the ships were transferred to the Ottoman Empire four years after their pursuit by the British battlecruisers Indomitable and Indefatigable and light cruisers Dublin and Gloucester.

== Service ==
=== Pre-war ===
When the First Balkan War broke out in October 1912, the permanent German naval presence in the Mediterranean amounted only to SMS Loreley, a small gunboat not intended for use in combat. Accordingly, the German General Staff determined that the German Empire required a larger naval presence to project power in the Mediterranean. As a result, the battlecruiser Goeben and the light cruiser Breslau sailed to join Loreley in Constantinople and to form the new Mediterranean Division. The two ships left Kiel on 4 November 1912, and arrived on 15 November. From April 1913, Goeben visited many Mediterranean ports, including Venice, Pola, and Naples, before sailing into Albanian waters, while the Kaiserliche Marine reinforced the Mediterranean Division with the light cruisers Strassburg and Dresden. Following this trip, Goeben returned to Pola and remained there from 21 August to 16 October 1913 for maintenance.

On 29 June 1913, the Second Balkan War broke out, causing the Mediterranean Division to remain in the area until the end of the war in August 1913 saw the withdrawal back to Germany of Strassburg and Dresden. On 23 October 1913, Konteradmiral Wilhelm Souchon assumed command of the squadron. Goeben and Breslau continued their activities in the Mediterranean, and visited some 80 ports before Germany entered the First World War on 1 August 1914. The German Navy intended to replace Goeben with her sistership Moltke in June 1914, but the assassination of Archduke Franz Ferdinand in Sarajevo, Bosnia on 28 June 1914 and the subsequent rise in tensions between the Great Powers made this impossible.

In the immediate aftermath of the assassination, Souchon correctly foresaw the possibility of imminent war between the Central Powers and the Triple Entente. Accordingly, he ordered his ships to make for the Austrian port of Pola in Croatia for repairs. Engineers came from Germany to work on the ship; Goeben had 4,460 boiler tubes replaced, among other repairs. Upon completion, the ships headed south. Germany declared war on France on 3 August, and Souchon's cruisers shelled the French Algerian ports Bone and Philippeville in the early hours of August 4. From there, they departed for Messina in Sicily for re-coaling by German merchant-ships. They arrived in the early hours of August 5 and coaled for 36 straight hours, protected from the British Royal Navy (Britain had entered the war on 4 August) due to Italy's neutrality.

=== The pursuit ===
After their coaling, the ships decided to break out of Messina, although it had been surrounded by British warships, the battlecruisers Indomitable and Indefatigable and the light cruisers Dublin and Gloucester, under the overall command of Sir Archibald Berkeley Milne. Milne thought that the Germans, after coaling at Messina, would break out to the west and try to escape to the Atlantic. Therefore, he positioned both his battlecruisers and Dublin at the west end of the Strait of Messina. The French also moved their Mediterranean fleet to guard the Gibraltar Strait. On August 6 they broke out of Messina and steamed northwards, feigning a move to the Adriatic Sea to make the British fleet drop back. However, after 5 hours of steaming west, Goeben decided to turn east as her coal supply was running low.

Goeben radioed Breslau to drop back and delay the Gloucester which would allow Goeben to reach a collier off the coast of Greece. Gloucester engaged Breslau with minor damage, and then tried to attack Goeben, but missed. Breslau was then able to continue on with Goeben. The battlecruisers had been approaching, but stopped after they received a false announcement that Austria-Hungary had declared war on England. The squadron avoided action with a cruiser squadron under Rear-Admiral Sir Ernest Troubridge, and on August 10, the ships reached Constantinople.

=== First World War ===
After their arrival in Constantinople on 16 August 1914, the ships transferred to the Ottoman Navy, although they retained their German crews and captains. Goeben and Breslau became Yavuz Sultan Selim and Midilli, respectively. Soon after their transfer, the ships participated in the Black Sea raid of 29 October 1914, shelling the Russian ports of Sevastopol and Novorossiysk; this helped to push Turkey into World War I in early November 1914 on the side of the Central Powers The German–Ottoman ships intercepted a Russian fleet at the Battle of Cape Sarych on 18 November 1914. The division then started to bombard Entente positions during the Dardanelles Campaign (April 1915) and to escort coal convoys (July 1915 onwards). At the Battle of Imbros on 20 January 1918, Midilli came under air attack, hit five mines, and sank. Yavuz Sultan Selim hit three mines, and came under attack by British torpedo boats and light bombers, but was towed to safety.

The Ottoman Empire ceased hostilities against the Allies on 31 October 1918 in accordance with the Armistice of Mudros of 30 October 1918. Yavuz Sultan Selim, the last remaining capital ship of the Imperial German Mediterranean Division, transferred from German control to an Ottoman crew on 2 November 1918, nine days before the Armistice ended the war for Germany.

== See also ==
- Imperial German Navy order of battle (1914)

== Bibliography ==
- Gardiner, Robert; Gray, Randal, eds. (1985). Conway's All the World's Fighting Ships 1906–1921. Annapolis, Maryland: Naval Institute Press. ISBN 0-87021-907-3.
- Halpern, Paul G. (1995). A Naval History of World War I. Annapolis, Maryland: Naval Institute Press. ISBN 1-55750-352-4.
- Hildebrand, Hans; Röhr, Albert; Steinmetz, Hans-Otto (1981). German warships: Biographies - A Mirror of Naval History from 1815 to the Present Volume 5 [Die deutschen Kriegsschiffe. Biographien - ein Spiegel der Marinegeschichte von 1815 bis zur Gegenwart. Band 5] (in German). Ratingen: Mundus Verlag. ISBN 978-3-78-220456-9.
- Staff, Gary (2006). German Battlecruisers: 1914–1918. Oxford, UK: Osprey Books. ISBN 978-1-84603-009-3.
- Sufrin, James (1987). "Ship of Misery and Ruin". Military History. Leesburg, Virginia: Empire Press: 1409.
