= HMS M28 =

Royal Navy monitor

Coordinates: 40°13′43″N 25°57′46″E

History

United Kingdom
- Name: HMS M28
- Builder: Sir Raylton Dixon & Co., Middlesbrough
- Laid down: 1 March 1915
- Launched: 28 June 1915
- Fate: Sunk during the Battle of Imbros on 20 January 1918

General characteristics
- Class & type: M15 class monitor
- Displacement: 540 long tons (550 t)
- Length: 177 ft 3 in (54.03 m)
- Beam: 31 ft (9.4 m)
- Draught: 6 ft 9 in (2.06 m)
- Propulsion: 4-shaft; Bolinder 4-cylinder semi-diesel; 640 hp
- Speed: 11 knots (20 km/h; 13 mph)
- Complement: 69
- Armament: 1 × BL 9.2-inch Mk VI gun; 1 × 12-pdr (76 mm) QF Mk 1 gun; 1 × 6-pdr (57 mm) QF MK 1 AA gun

HMS M28 was a First World War Royal Navy M15-class monitor. She was sunk during the Battle of Imbros in 1918.

== Design ==
Intended as a shore bombardment vessel, M28's primary armament was a single 9.2 inch Mk VI gun removed from the Edgar-class cruiser HMS Grafton. In addition to her 9.2-inch gun, she also possessed one 12 pounder and one six-pound anti-aircraft gun. She was equipped with a four-shaft Bolinder four-cylinder semi-diesel engine with 640 horsepower that allowed a top speed of eleven knots. The monitor's crew consisted of sixty-nine officers and men.

== Construction ==
HMS M28 was laid down at the Sir Raylton Dixon & Co. Ltd shipyard at Middlesbrough on 1 March 1915. She was then launched on 28 June 1915, and completed in August 1915.

== Career ==
Wreck location

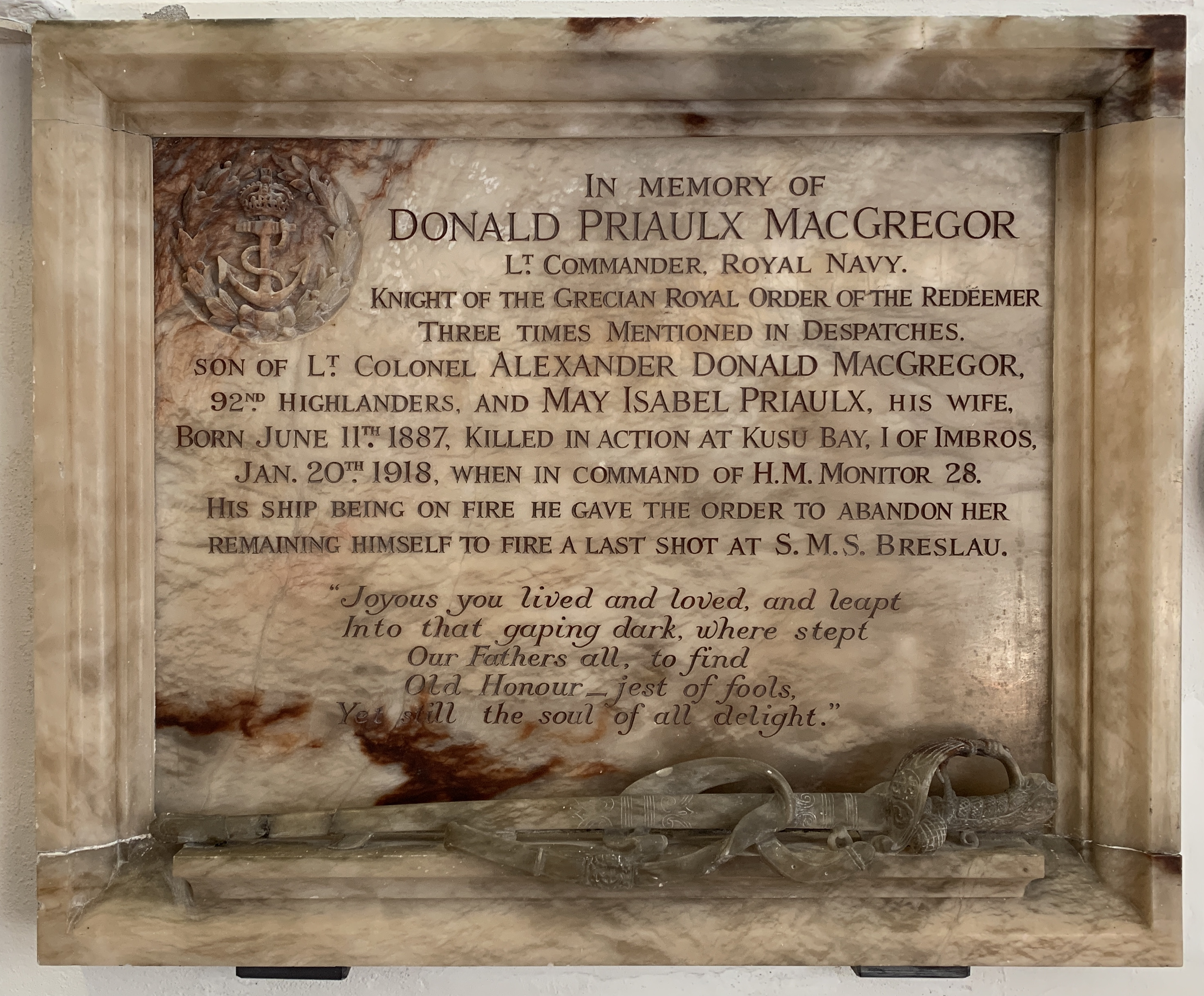
Memorial to Lt. Commander Donald Priaulx MacGregor in Town Church, Guernsey

During most of her service in the First World War M28 was attached to the Aegean Squadron and tasked with coastal bombardment of Turkish positions. On 21 October 1915 she bombarded the Bulgarian port of Dedeagatch. On 20 January 1918, she had been stationed at Kusu Bay on the island of Imbros along with HMS Raglan, HMS Lizard, and HMS Tigress when she was attacked by two Turkish vessels. The former SMS Goeben and SMS Breslau managed to trap M28 and Raglan in the bay and engage them in what became known as the Battle of Imbros. As a result of the battle M28 was sunk and suffered 11 of her crew killed while the rest were rescued by Allied vessels.
