= Hubert von Rebeur-Paschwitz =

German admiral (1863–1933)

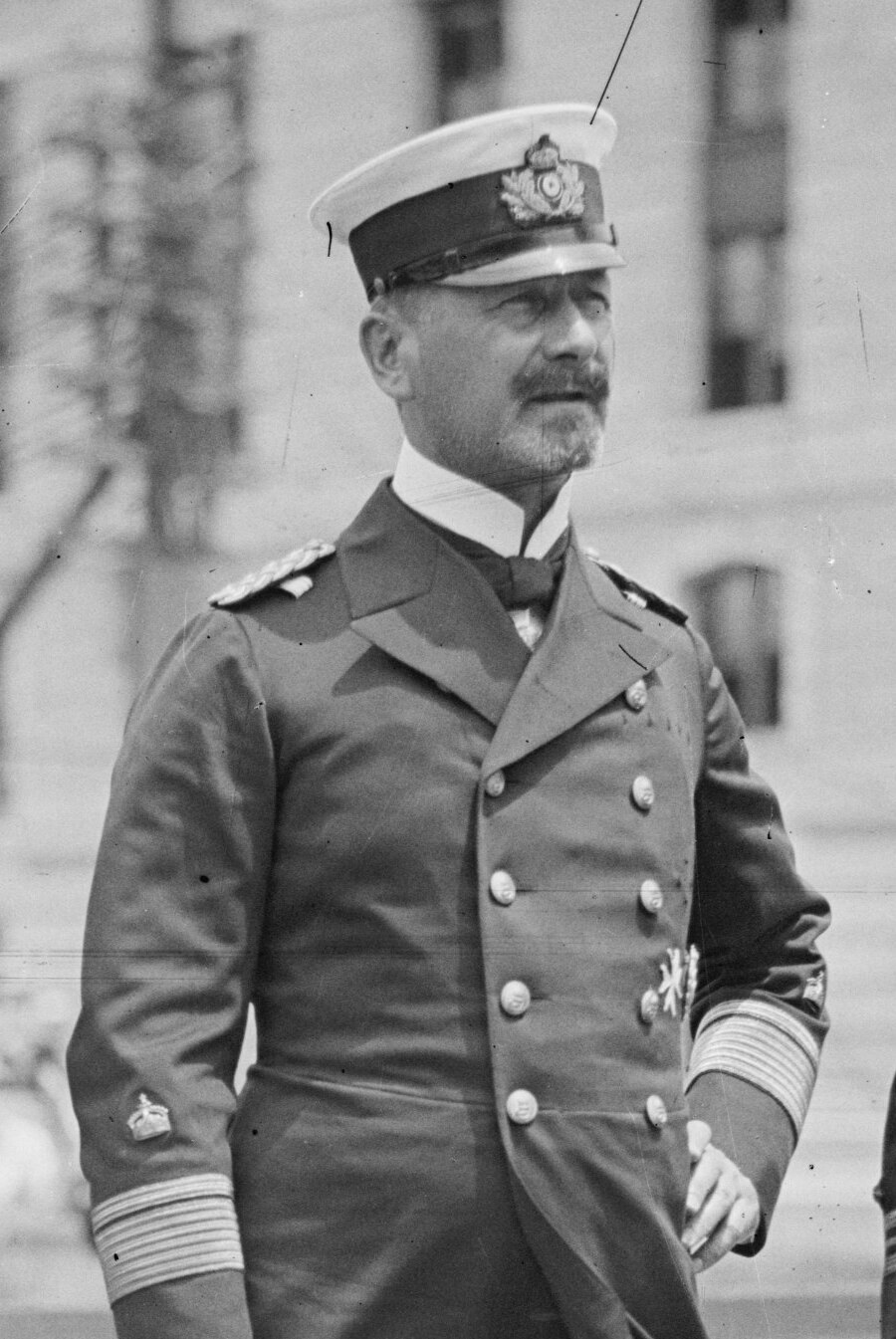
- Rebeur-Paschwitz in Washington D.C. in 1912.
- Born: 14 August 1863; Frankfurt (Oder), Kingdom of Prussia
- Died: 16 February 1933 (aged 69); Dresden
- Military career
- Allegiance: German Empire; Ottoman Empire; Weimar Republic
- Branch: Imperial German Navy; Ottoman Navy; Reichsmarine
- Service years: 1889 - 1920
- Rank: Vizeadmiral
- Conflicts: World War I: Battle of Imbros

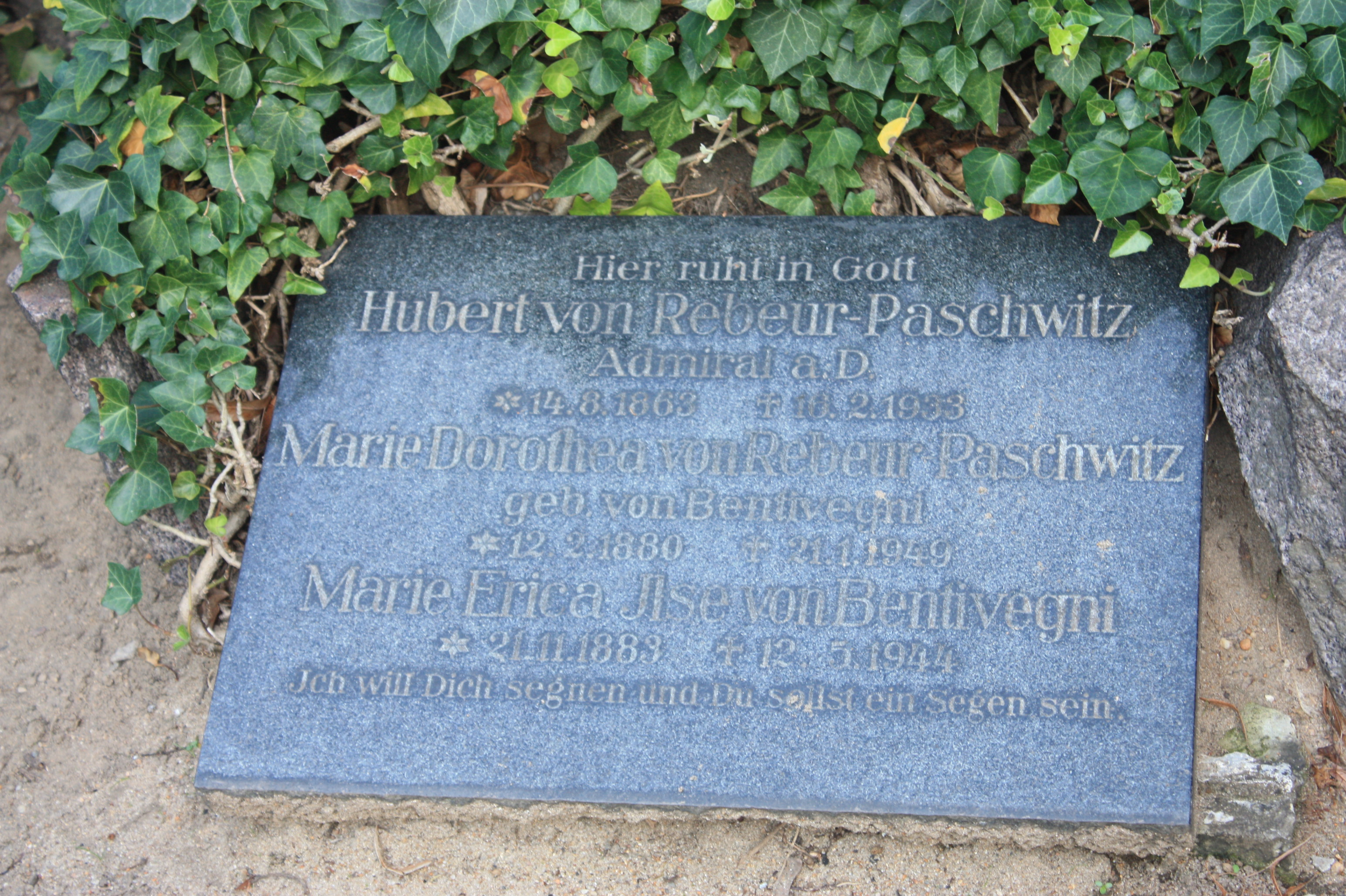
The grave of Hubert von Rebeur-Paschwitz in Dresden

Vizeadmiral Hubert von Rebeur-Paschwitz (14 August 1863 Frankfurt (Oder) – 16 February 1933 (Dresden)) was a German admiral. In 1899 he served as the German Naval attaché to Washington and later in 1912 commanded a flotilla of German vessels that visited the United States. During World War I he was transferred to the Black Sea in order to command the Central Powers naval forces that had previously been under the command of Admiral Souchon who had been recalled to the High Seas Fleet in 1917. Rebeur-Paschwitz decided to launch an offensive into the Mediterranean Sea which ended in his defeat at the Battle of Imbros. At the outbreak of war in August 1914, Hubert von Rebeur-Paschwitz took command of the III Reconnaissance Group, with the old armored cruiser Roon as flagship, from August 2, 1914, to April 17, 1915, and participated in raids in the North and Baltic Seas. In April 1915, he became Inspector of Education of the Imperial Navy and was promoted to Vice Admiral on September 18, 1915. From November 1916 to August 15, 1917, he was (initially acting) commander of the II Squadron of the High Seas Fleet, which included the old ships of the line.

On 4 September 1917, Vice Admiral Hubert von Rebeur-Paschwitz succeeded Wilhelm Souchon, who had been appointed to the High Seas Fleet, as Chief of the Mediterranean Division and Commander of the Turkish Fleet. This made him Supreme Commander of the Ottoman Navy until November 1918. The commander's flagship was the Yavuz Sultan Selim, which was used in the Mediterranean region. After the armistice with Russia in December 1917, he made a raid to Imbros in January 1918, during which two British monitors were sunk, but his unit ran into a minefield, the Midilli, formerly Breslau, sank, and the Yavuz Sultan Selim, formerly Goeben, was badly damaged. Von Rebeur-Paschwitz remained in Turkey until the armistice. He was discharged from the Navy on 12 February 1919 and promoted to admiral on 4 September 1919. In the 1920s, he served as adjutant to the Kaiser, who had gone into exile in the Netherlands, at the Doorn House .

Hubert von Rebeur-Paschwitz later moved to Dresden and lived at Zittauer Straße 11 in Dresden Neustadt. He died there on February 26, 1933.

== Decorations and awards ==
- Order of the Red Eagle, 2nd class with oak leaves (Prussia)
- Order of the Crown, 2nd class (Prussia)
- Knight's Cross of the Royal House Order of Hohenzollern
- Honorary Knights of Order of Saint John (Bailiwick of Brandenburg)
- Service Award (Prussia)
- Commander Second Class of the Order of the Zähringer Lion (Baden)
- Commander 2nd class of the Order of Philip the Magnanimous (Grand Duchy of Hesse)
- Honour Commander of the House and Merit Order of Peter Frederick Louis (Oldenburg)
- Commander Second Class of the Albert Order
- Knight's Cross, First Class of the House Order of the White Falcon
- Cross of Honour of the Order of the Crown (Württemberg)
- Commander, First Class of the Order of the Dannebrog (Denmark)
- Commander of the Order of the Redeemer (Greece)
- Honorary Commander of the Royal Victorian Order (United Kingdom)
- Grand Officer of the Order of the Crown of Italy
- Grand Officer of the Order of Orange-Nassau (Netherlands)
- Commander Class II of the Order of St. Olav (Norway)
- Commander with Star of the Order of Franz Joseph (Austria)
- Order of St. Stanislaus, 2nd class with Star
- Commander, First Class of the Order of the Sword (Sweden)
- Iron Cross of 1914, 1st and 2nd class
