= SMS Breslau =

Light cruiser of the German Imperial Navy

Coordinates: 40°3′42″N 25°58′42″E

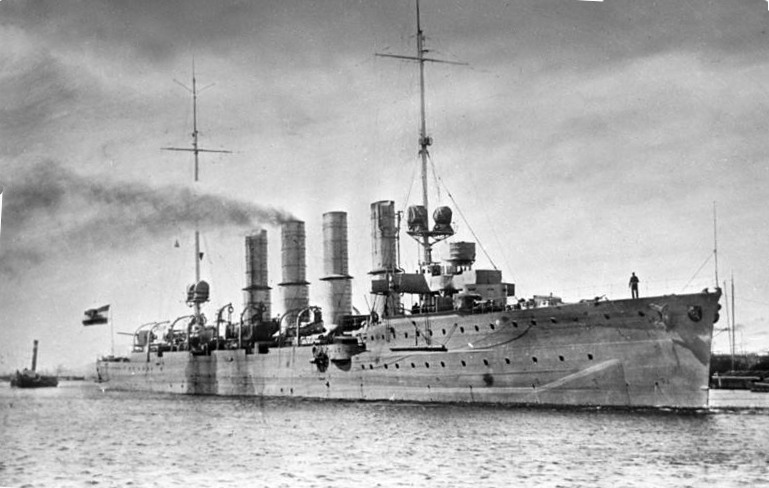
- SMS Breslau in 1912

History

German Empire
- Name: Breslau
- Namesake: Breslau
- Builder: AG Vulcan
- Laid down: 1910
- Launched: 16 May 1911
- Commissioned: 10 May 1912
- Fate: Transferred to the Ottoman Empire 16 August 1914

History

Ottoman Empire
- Name: Midilli
- Namesake: Island of Midilli
- Acquired: 16 August 1914
- Fate: Mined & sunk off Imbros, 20 January 1918

General characteristics
- Class & type: Magdeburg-class cruiser
- Displacement: Normal: 4,564 t (4,492 long tons); Full load: 5,281 t (5,198 long tons)
- Length: 138.7 m (455 ft 1 in)
- Beam: 13.5 m (44 ft 3 in)
- Draft: 4.4 m (14 ft 5 in)
- Installed power: 16 × water-tube boilers; 25,000 shp (19,000 kW)
- Propulsion: 2 × steam turbines; 4 × screw propellers
- Speed: 27.5 knots (50.9 km/h; 31.6 mph)
- Range: 5,820 nmi (10,780 km; 6,700 mi) at 12 knots (22 km/h; 14 mph)
- Complement: 18 officers; 336 enlisted
- Armament: 12 × 10.5 cm (4.1 in) SK L/45 guns; 120 mines; 2 × 50 cm (19.7 in) torpedo tubes
- Armor: Belt: 60 mm (2.4 in); Deck: 60 mm; Conning tower: 100 mm (3.9 in)

SMS Breslau was a Magdeburg-class cruiser of the Imperial German Navy, built in the early 1910s and named after the Lower Silesian city of Breslau. Following her commissioning, Breslau and the battlecruiser Goeben were assigned to the Mittelmeerdivision (Mediterranean Division) in response to the Balkan Wars. After evading British warships in the Mediterranean to reach Constantinople, Breslau and Goeben were transferred to the Ottoman Empire in August 1914, to entice the Ottomans to join the Central Powers in World War I. The two ships, along with several other Ottoman vessels, raided Russian ports in October 1914, prompting a Russian declaration of war. The ships were renamed Midilli and Yavûz Sultân Selîm, respectively, and saw extensive service with the Ottoman fleet, primarily in the Black Sea against the Russian Black Sea Fleet.

Midilli was active in laying minefields off the Russian coast, bombarding Russian ports and installations and, because of a shortage of Ottoman merchant ships, transporting troops and supplies to the Black Sea ports supplying Ottoman troops fighting in the Caucasus Campaign. She was lightly damaged several times by Russian ships, but the most serious damage was inflicted by a mine in 1915, which kept her out of service for half of a year. The ship was sunk by mines in January 1918 during the Battle of Imbros, with the loss of the vast majority of her crew.

== Design ==
Plan and profile of the Magdeburg class

The Magdeburg-class cruisers were designed in response to the development of the British Invincible-class battlecruisers, which were faster than all existing German light cruisers. As a result, speed of the new ships had to be increased. To accomplish this, more powerful engines were fitted and their hulls were lengthened to improve their hydrodynamic efficiency. These changes increased top speed from 25.5 to 27 knots (47.2 to 50.0 km/h; 29.3 to 31.1 mph) over the preceding Kolberg-class cruisers. To save weight, longitudinal framing was adopted for the first time in a major German warship design. In addition, the Magdeburgs were the first cruisers to carry belt armor, which was necessitated by the adoption of more powerful 6-inch (150 mm) guns in the latest British cruisers.

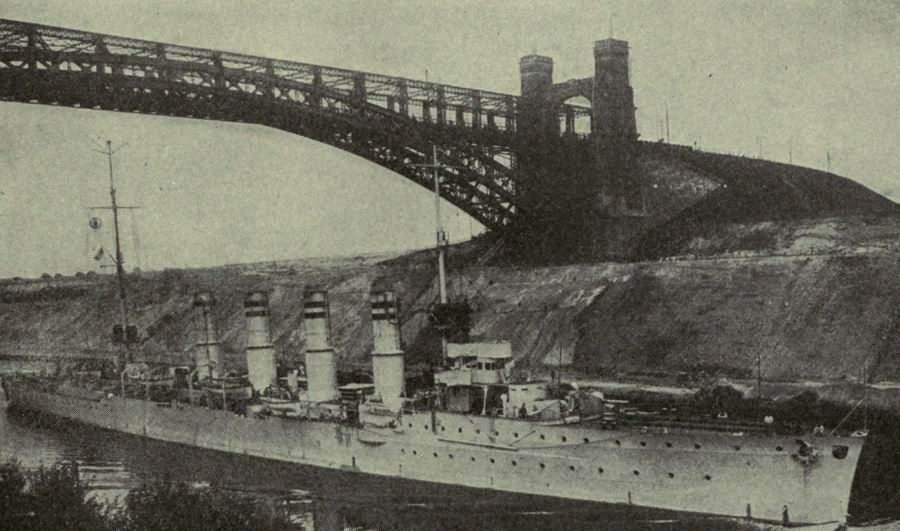
Breslau in the Kaiser Wilhelm Canal, passing underneath the Levensau High Bridge

Breslau was 138.7 meters (455 ft 1 in) long overall and had a beam of 13.5 m (44 ft 3 in) and a draft of 4.4 m (14 ft 5 in) forward. She displaced 4,564 t (4,492 long tons) normally and up to 5,281 t (5,198 long tons) at full load. The ship had a short forecastle deck and a minimal superstructure that consisted primarily of a conning tower located on the forecastle. She was fitted with two pole masts with platforms for searchlights. Breslau had a crew of 18 officers and 336 enlisted men.

Her propulsion system consisted of two sets of AEG-Vulcan steam turbines driving four 2.47-meter (8 ft 1 in) propellers. They were designed to give 25,000 shaft horsepower (19,000 kW), but reached 33,482 shp (24,968 kW) in service. These were powered by sixteen coal-fired Marine-type water-tube boilers, although they were later altered to use fuel oil that was sprayed on the coal to increase its burn rate. The boilers were vented through four funnels located amidships. These gave the ship a top speed of 27.5 knots (50.9 km/h; 31.6 mph). Breslau carried 1,200 t (1,181 long tons) of coal, and an additional 106 t (104 long tons) of oil that gave her a range of approximately 5,820 nautical miles (10,780 km; 6,700 mi) at 12 knots (22 km/h; 14 mph). (Note: According to Hildebrand, Röhr, & Steinmetz, Breslau was built with only three funnels, with the fourth added after trials. Gröner does not support this, with a line-drawing showing of the ship as built, with four funnels, nor is it mentioned in Campbell & Sieche.)

The ship was armed with a main battery of twelve 10.5 cm (4.1 in) SK L/45 guns in single pedestal mounts. Two were placed side by side forward on the forecastle, eight were located on the broadside, four on either side, and two were side by side aft. The guns had a maximum elevation of 30 degrees, which allowed them to engage targets out to 12,700 m (13,900 yd). They were supplied with 1,800 rounds of ammunition, for 150 shells per gun. By 1917, the 10.5 cm guns were replaced with eight 15 cm (5.9 in) SK L/45 guns, one fore and aft and three on each broadside. She was also equipped with a pair of 50 cm (19.7 in) torpedo tubes with five torpedoes; the tubes were submerged in the hull on the broadside. She could also carry 120 mines.

Breslau was protected by a waterline armor belt and a curved armor deck. The deck was flat across most of the hull, but angled downward at the sides and connected to the bottom edge of the belt. The belt and deck were both 60 mm (2.4 in) thick. The conning tower had 100 mm (3.9 in) thick sides.

== Service history ==
=== Early career ===
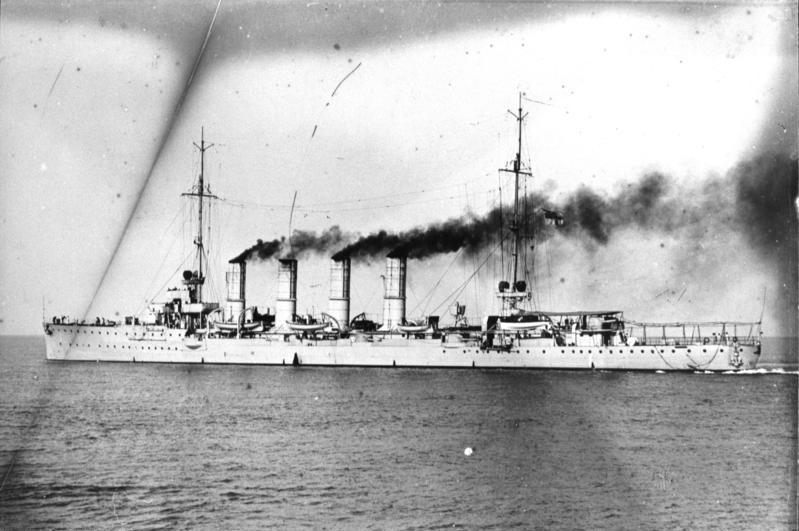
Breslau at sea, c. 1912–1914

Breslau was ordered under the contract name "Ersatz Falke", (Note: German warships were ordered under provisional names. Additions to the fleet were given a single letter; ships intended to replace older or lost vessels were ordered as "Ersatz (name of the ship to be replaced)".) and was laid down at the AG Vulcan shipyard in Stettin in early 1910. At her launching ceremony on 16 May 1911, she was christened by the mayor of Breslau, the ship's namesake. After her launching, fitting-out work commenced and lasted until mid-1912. On 10 May, she was commissioned to begin sea trials, which were interrupted to escort Hohenzollern—Kaiser Wilhelm II's yacht—first to the Kiel Week sailing regatta and then for the Kaiser's annual summer cruise to Norwegian waters. The ship's first commander was Fregattenkapitän (FK—Frigate Captain) Lebrecht von Klitzing. Only on 23 August could Breslau return to her initial testing, which were interrupted again by the annual autumn maneuvers of the High Seas Fleet, held from 12 to 20 September, during which Breslau escorted Wilhlem II again. On 26 September, Breslau was assigned to the Scouting Unit. (Note: Karl Dönitz, the future Grand Admiral during World War II, served aboard Breslau from 1912 to 1916.)

The ship's stint in the main fleet's reconnaissance force proved short-lived; on 3 November, Klitzing received orders for Breslau to join the battlecruiser Goeben to form the Mittelmeerdivision (Mediterranean Division), under the command of Konteradmiral (Rear Admiral) Wilhelm Souchon. The German Navy decided it needed a permanent naval presence in the Mediterranean following the outbreak of the First Balkan War on 8 October 1912. Breslau sailed from Wilhelmshaven on 5 November, steaming at top speed for the eastern Mediterranean. After arriving in Alexandria in Ottoman Egypt, Breslau met with the unprotected cruiser Geier and the protected cruiser Hertha. Breslau then sailed on to visit a series of ports in Greece and the Ottoman Empire, ultimately arriving in the Ottoman capital at Constantinople. By 25 March 1913, the ship had sailed west to Brindisi, Italy, where Ernst August, the Kaiser's son-in-law, came aboard. From there, the ship sailed to Corfu, where she embarked Prince Heinrich, the Kaiser's brother. She then carried both men to Piraeus, Greece, for the funeral of King George I of Greece, who had been assassinated on 18 March.

In April, the Great Powers decided to implement a blockade of Montenegro to force the government to end the Siege of Scutari and allow the city to fall under the control of Albania. Breslau joined an international naval force in the Adriatic Sea that included warships from Britain, France, Austria-Hungary, Italy, and Russia. After the Montenegrin government withdrew from the city, the international force sent landing parties ashore at the mouth of the Bojana and then move overland to Scutari. The landing parties were to take temporary control with a provisional international government. Breslau contributed 100 men to the occupation force. The Powers agreed to place Klitzing in the role of civil commissioner over the interim government. The crew aboard Breslau was having difficulty keeping the ship operational with their reduced number, and so Germany sent the so-called Scutari Detachment to Pola, Austria-Hungary, which Breslau embarked on 30 June. She took them to the mouth of the Bojana and exchanged the soldiers for her landing party on 6 July. The ship remained in the Gulf of Drin until 6 August, when she departed to return to Constantinople, arriving there four days later.

Breslau remained in Constantinople from mid-August until 27 October. During this period of rest, her crew and that of the German station ship Loreley helped to suppress a major fire in the French embassy in the city, and then assist with cleanup of the flood damage. Also in October, FK Paul Kettner arrived to relieve Klitzing as the ship's captain. After getting underway again in late October, Breslau initially cruised in the eastern Mediterranean, and then in early January 1914, she returned to the mouth of the Bojana. From there, she steamed north to Trieste, Austria-Hungary, where she underwent an overhaul that lasted until 18 March. She thereafter joined Goeben to escort Hohenzollern on the Kaiser's Mediterranean cruise; the three vessels steamed together from Venice, Italy, to Corfu. Breslau then departed to return to her patrol area off the Levant. The ship returned to the Adriatic and anchored at Durazzo, Albania, on 20 June in response to domestic unrest in the country. Breslau was to protect the Albanian king, Prince Wilhelm. After the situation calmed, the Germans left behind a detachment of ten men to guard the German embassy. From there, Breslau steamed to Corfu, where she rendezvoused with Goeben on 8 July. Souchon gave instructions to both vessels' crews in the event that the tensions created over the assassination of Archduke Franz Ferdinand led to war in Europe. On 1 August, as the July Crisis spiraled out of control, Breslau returned to Durazzo to pick up the ten men who had been left at the embassy. She then rejoined Goeben; the two ships received the mobilization order on the night of 2 August.

=== World War I ===
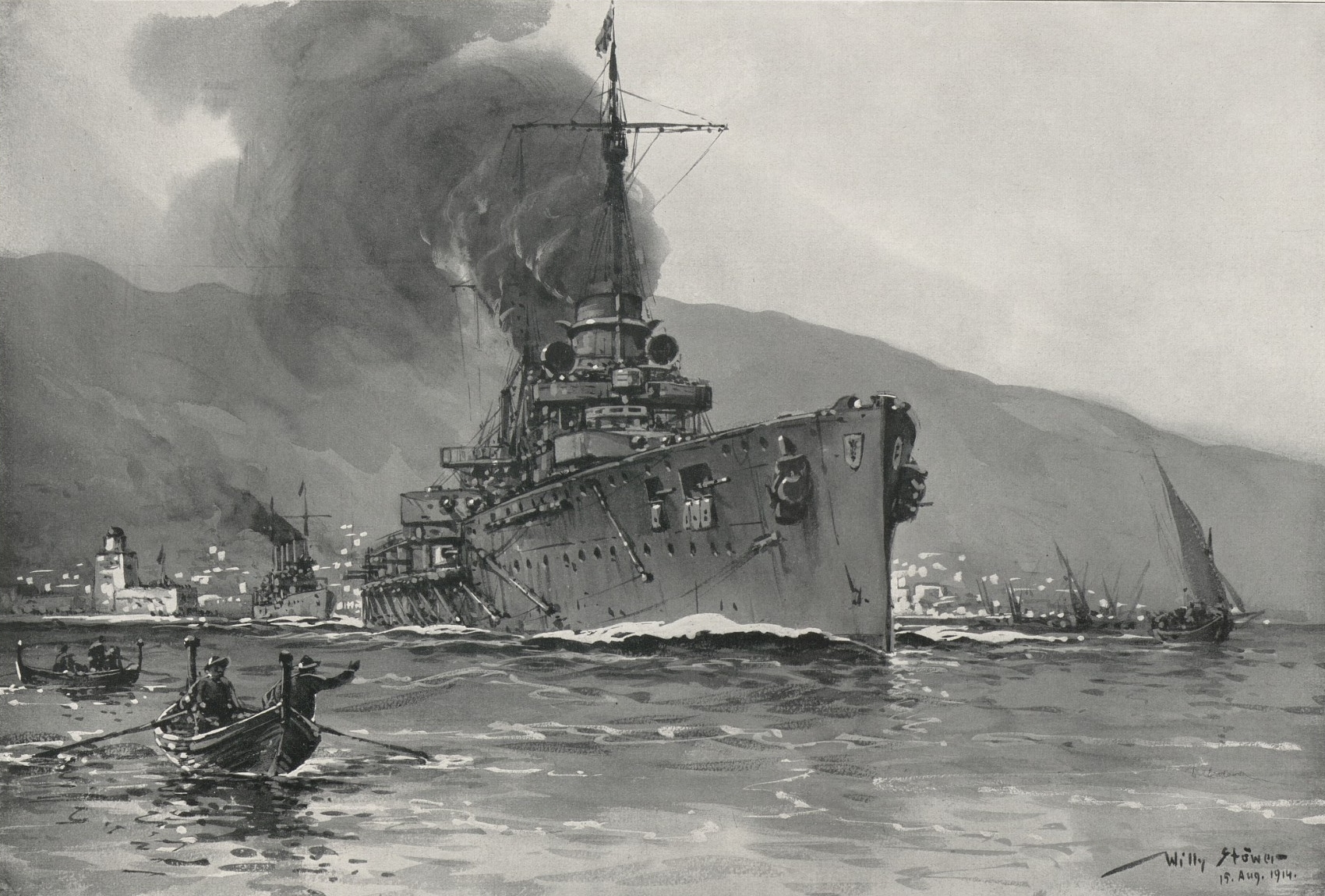
Goeben, followed by Breslau, in Messina, by Willy Stöwer

At the outbreak of World War I, Breslau and Goeben were to interdict French transports transferring troops from Algeria to France. On 3 August 1914, Souchon's two ships were steaming off Algeria; shortly after 06:00, Breslau bombarded the embarkation port of Bône while Goeben attacked Philippeville. The attacks caused minimal damage, however, and Souchon quickly broke off and returned to Messina to replenish his coal stocks. Although the British were not yet at war with Germany, the two British battlecruisers HMS Indomitable and Indefatigable shadowed the German ships while en route to Messina. After partially replenishing Goeben's coal on the 5th, Souchon arranged to meet a collier in the Aegean. Goeben and Breslau left port the following morning bound for Constantinople, pursued by the British Mediterranean Fleet. That evening, the 1st Cruiser Squadron, commanded by Rear Admiral Ernest Troubridge, intercepted the Germans; Breslau briefly exchanged fire with the light cruiser Gloucester before Troubridge broke off the attack, fearing Goeben's powerful 28 cm (11 in) guns.

On 8 August, Goeben and Breslau met the collier off the island of Donoussa near Naxos, and two days later they entered the Dardanelles, under escort of an Ottoman torpedo boat. To circumvent neutrality requirements, Germany transferred the two ships to the Ottoman Navy on 16 August, and officially the Ottomans purchased the two ships as replacement for the battleships Reşadiye and Sultan Osman I, which had been confiscated by the British Royal Navy shortly before they were completed at British shipyards. The supposed sale was simply a ruse, as only a small number of Ottoman naval personnel came aboard the ships, and on 23 September, Souchon accepted an offer to command the Ottoman fleet. Breslau was renamed Midilli after the Ottoman name for Lesbos, while Goeben was renamed Yavûz Sultân Selîm; their German crews remained with the ships and donned Ottoman uniforms and fezzes. The British did not accept the sale of the ships to the Ottoman Empire and stationed a blockading force outside the Dardanelles with orders to attack the ships if they appeared, regardless of the flag they flew.

Over the following month, the German and Ottoman governments negotiated the terms of the agreement that would bring the Ottomans into the war on the side of the Central Powers. By 22 October, the situation was resolved, and the Ottoman war minister, Enver Pasha, ordered the fleet to mobilize and prepare for offensive operations against Russia. There would be no declaration of war first, however.

==== Ottoman service ====
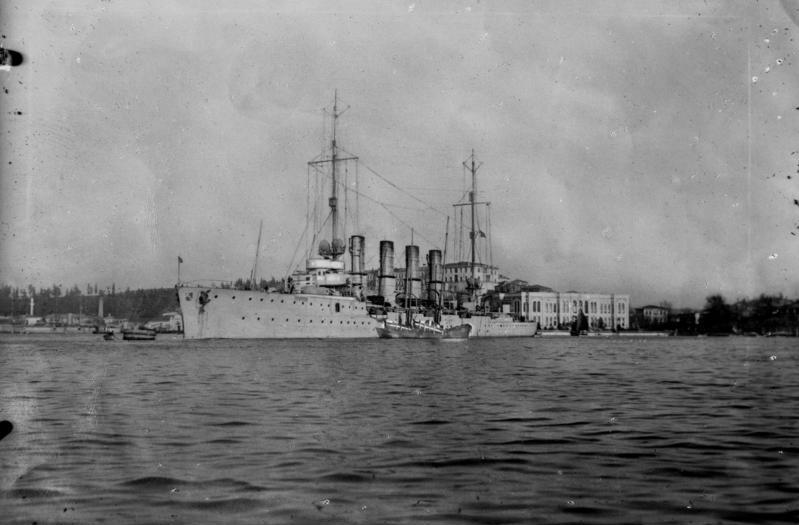
Breslau, flying the Ottoman flag as Midilli

===== 1914 =====
On the evening of 27 October 1914, Midilli and the rest of the Ottoman fleet left the Bosporus and steamed into the Black Sea, ostensibly to conduct maneuvers. Instead, the fleet split into four groups to attack Russian bases on the other side of the Black Sea; Midilli and another cruiser were tasked with mining the Strait of Kerch and then attacking the port of Novorossisk. Midilli laid sixty mines in the Strait, which later claimed two Russian merchant ships, and then joined the other ship in bombarding Novorossisk. They set the port's oil tanks on fire, damaged seven merchant ships, and sank Nikolai of 1,085 gross register tons (GRT). Although the damage inflicted on the Russians was relatively light, it forced the Russians to declare war on the Ottoman Empire, bringing the country into the war on the side of Germany.

In early November 1914, while Midilli was operating in the eastern Black Sea and covering Ottoman transports, she was detached to shell the Russian port of Poti in retaliation for Russian attacks on Ottoman shipping. On 17 November, she sortied with Yavûz Sultân Selîm, under the command of Souchon, in an attempt to intercept the Black Sea Fleet as it returned from bombarding Trebizond. Midilli discovered the Russian ships off Cape Sarych, the southern tip of the Crimea in poor visibility at short range. In the resulting engagement on 18 November, Souchon ordered Midilli to assume a safer position to Yavûz's rear, but she was engaged by the pre-dreadnoughts Tri Sviatitelia and Rostislav without effect before Souchon ordered the Ottoman ships to disengage shortly afterward. The cruiser spent the rest of the month escorting shipping to Trebizond. On 5 December, she escorted a small raiding party to Akkerman, Bessarabia, that was intended to attack railroad installations. On the return voyage, Midilli bombarded Sevastopol, damaging some minesweepers at anchor.

A month later, on 23 December, Midilli sortied to rendezvous with Yavûz Sultân Selîm off Sinope, and in the darkness the following morning she encountered the Russian transport Oleg, which was intended to be sunk as a blockship in Zonguldak. Midilli quickly sank Oleg but was forced to turn away after spotting Rostislav. She then encountered another blockship, Athos, and forced her crew to scuttle the ship. She then briefly engaged Russian destroyers before moving ahead of the Russian fleet to monitor their progress. Ottoman coastal guns forced the remaining blockships to scuttle in deep water.

===== 1915 =====
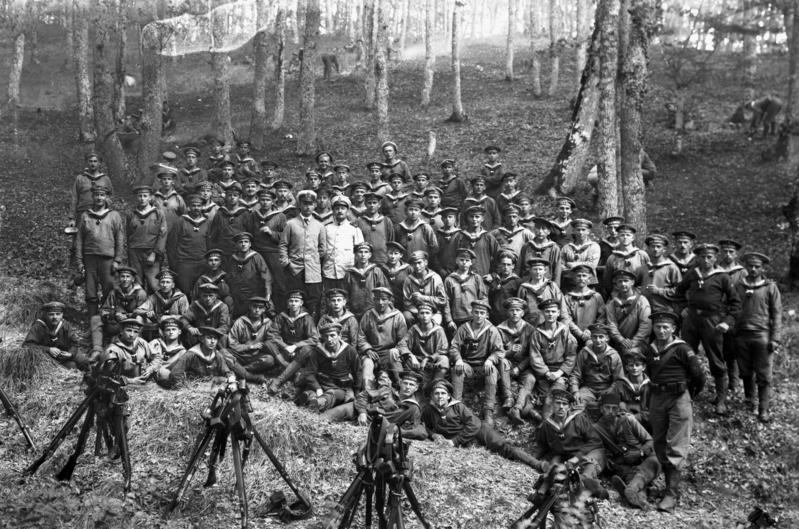
Sailors from Midilli during the Gallipoli campaign

Midilli conducted a series of sorties against the Russians in early 1915, including an operation in concert with the cruiser Hamidiye in January, during which they inadvertently came into contact with the Black Sea Fleet. Midilli scored a hit on the battleship Evstafi's main battery turret before the Ottoman ships withdrew.

On 3 April, the Ottoman fleet sortied to attack Russian transports off Odessa. Midilli and Yavûz Sultân Selîm provided the covering force for the attack, which failed after the cruiser Mecidiye struck a mine and sank off Odessa. The Russian fleet attempted to intercept the Ottoman force, but Midilli and Yavûz Sultân Selîm were able to escape undamaged. The two ships, joined by Hamidiye, conducted a sweep to attack Russian transports on 6 May, but found no targets. Later that month, detachments of naval infantry from Midilli and Yavûz Sultân Selîm were landed to assist in the defense against the Allied landings at Gallipoli. On the night of 10/11 June, Midilli encountered the Russian destroyers Derzky and Gnevny off Zonguldak. In a brief firefight, the cruiser crippled Gnevny with a hit in her starboard engine compartment that broke the main steam line to the engines, but was forced to turn away when Gnevny fired five torpedoes at her. Midilli was hit by gunfire seven times herself with only slight damage and Gnevny was towed back to Sevastopol the following day by Derzky.

Midilli struck a mine on 18 July as she sailed from Constantinople to escort a merchant ship through the minefields defending the capital. The explosion under No. 4 boiler room killed eight crewmen and she was flooded with over 600 t (590 long tons) of water. The ship made it to port at İstinye and an inspection revealed that she was not badly damaged. Hampered by a shortage of trained personnel and material, however, the ship's repairs took quite a long time.

===== 1916 =====
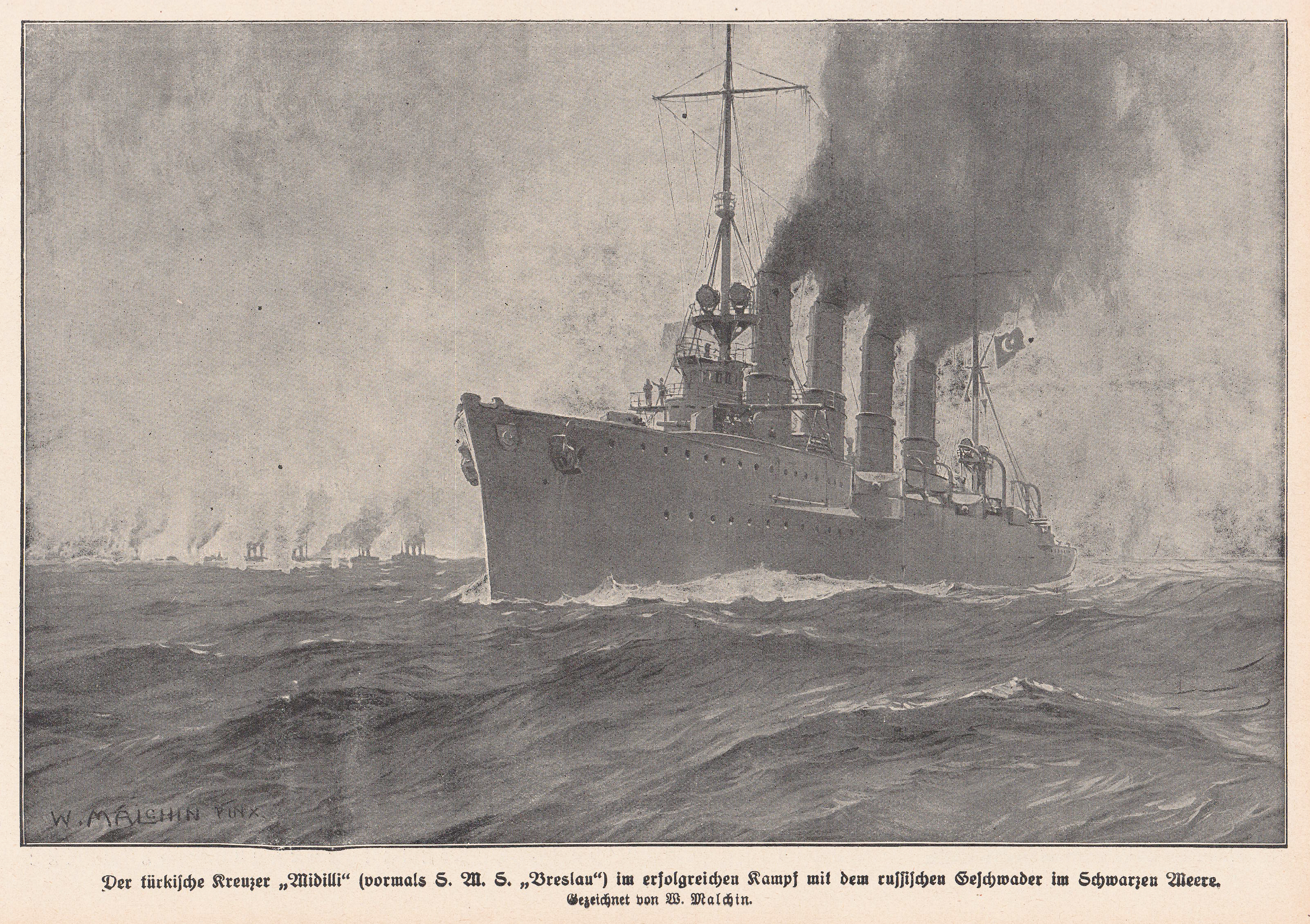
Sketch of Midilli underway

The ship did not return to service until February 1916, and the opportunity was taken to replace two of her 10.5 cm guns with 15 cm pieces. On 27 February, she was used to quickly transport 71 officers and men of a machine-gun company and a significant stock of supplies and munitions to Trebizond, which was then under heavy pressure from the Russian army. While en route on the night of the 28th, she encountered the Russian destroyers Pronzitelni and Bespokoiny. Midilli evaded the Russians and reached Trebizond. On 2 March, she attempted to attack a pair of destroyers north of Zonguldak, but she was unable to catch them. The ship then returned to the Bosporus. On 11 March, Midilli made another run, this time carrying 211 soldiers and twelve barrels of fuel and lubricating oil, which were successfully landed on the 13th. She then stopped in Samsun, where she picked up 30 t (30 long tons; 33 short tons) of flour, one ton of maize, and 30 tons of coal, before returning to the Bosporus. (Note: Halpern is probably using German sources for this period, but the Turkish sources used by Langensiepen & Güleryüz provide a slightly different account. They refer to carrying troops to Trebizond and oil to Sinope on 27 February with no mention of any encounter with Russian destroyers. Furthermore, "A planned expedition along the Caucasus coast by Midilli is abandoned due to bad weather and the cruiser returns to base on 2 March.")

A third supply operation followed on 3 April, when the ship brought 107 men, 5,000 rifles, and 794 cases of ammunition to Trebizond. After making the delivery, the ship met the U-boat U-33 and proceeded to attack Russian forces. Midilli shelled Russian positions at Sürmene Bay, where she set the minesweeper T.233 on fire, which was then destroyed by U-33's deck gun. Midilli then turned north and sank a Russian sailing vessel off Tuapse before running into the powerful dreadnought battleship Imperatritsa Ekaterina Velikaya. Midilli fled at high speed after being straddled several times, though she was not damaged. (Note: Langensiepen & Güleryüz also give a different account of this affair. They date the resupply mission to 18 April and that T.233 was heavily damaged, but survived. Midilli then sank the sailing ship Nikolay by herself. She encountered the Russian dreadnought on 19 April while returning from this mission.) In early May, the cruiser laid two minefields, each of 60 mines. The first of these was laid off the Chilia branch of the Danube River and the other off Cape Tarkhankut in the Crimea. On the second trip she bombarded Yevpatoria after laying her mines. Midilli transported more troops to Sinope and Samsun on 30 May, returning with grain and tobacco as deck cargo.

In July, Midilli and Yavûz Sultân Selîm sortied to support the Ottoman counterattack at Trebizond, which broke the Russian lines and advanced some 20 km (12 mi). Midilli sank a pair of Russian ships off Sochi on 4 July and destroyed another that had been torpedoed the previous day. She then rejoined Yavûz Sultân Selîm for the return to the Bosporus, during which the two ships evaded strong Russian forces attempting to intercept them. Later that month, on 21 July, Midilli attempted to lay a minefield off Novorossisk, but Russian wireless interception allowed the dreadnought Imperatritsa Mariya and several destroyers to leave port and attempt to cut Midilli off from the Bosporus. The two ships encountered each other at 13:05, and Midilli quickly turned back south. Her stern 15 cm gun kept Russian destroyers at bay, but the ship only slowly drew out of range of Imperatritsa Mariya's heavy guns. Several near misses rained shell splinters on the deck and wounded several men. Heavy use of smoke screens and a rain squall allowed Midilli to break contact with her Russian pursuers, and she reached the Bosporus early the following morning. By the end of 1916, a severe coal shortage prevented Midilli and Yavûz Sultân Selîm from conducting offensive operations.

===== 1917–1918 =====
Wreck location

In May 1917, Midilli laid a minefield off the mouth of the Danube; while there, she destroyed the wireless station on Fidonisi Island and captured 11 prisoners. The minefield she laid later sank the destroyer Leytenant Zatsarenni on 30 June. While Midilli was at sea, a Russian force including Imperatritsa Ekaterina Velikaya, which had by then been renamed Svobodnaya Rossiya, raided the Bosporus. Returning to port, Midilli was spotted by the Russian fleet, which attempted to cut her off from the safety of the Bosporus. Midilli raced toward port, while salvos from Svobodnaya Rossiya fell around her. The destroyer Gnevny closed to attack, but Midilli's 15 cm guns drove her off. The cruiser managed to reach port without damage; this was the last engagement of the war between the former German warships and the Russian fleet. (Note: Langensiepen & Güleryüz date the minelaying to 23 June and the encounter with Svobodnaya Rossiya to 25 June.) On 1 November, Midilli left the Bosporus to conduct a sweep for Russian warships. The Russians observed the departure and attempted to attack the cruiser with Svobodnaya Rossiya and the new battleship Volya, but mutiny aboard Svobodnaya Rossiya prevented the force from intercepting Midilli before she slipped back into port that night. (Note: Langensiepen & Güleryüz only describe an unsuccessful search for a pair of Russian destroyers that had destroyed an Ottoman convoy on 31 October and make no mention of an attempted Russian interception.)

On 20 January 1918, Midilli and Yavûz Sultân Selîm left the Dardanelles under the command of Vice Admiral Hubert von Rebeur-Paschwitz, who had replaced Souchon the previous September. Rebeur-Paschwitz's intention was to draw Allied naval forces away from Palestine in support of Ottoman forces there. Outside the straits, in the course of what became known as the Battle of Imbros, the two Ottoman ships surprised and sank the monitors Raglan and M28 which were at anchor and unsupported by the pre-dreadnoughts that should have been guarding them. Rebeur-Paschwitz then decided to proceed to the port of Mudros; there the British pre-dreadnought battleship Agamemnon was raising steam to attack the Ottoman ships. While en route to Mudros Midilli struck a total of five mines and sank; Yavûz hit three mines as well and was forced to beach to avoid sinking. Three hundred and thirty of Midilli's crew were killed in her sinking, though the number of survivors differs. According to Langensiepen & Güleryüz, 162 survivors were rescued by British destroyers, but Hildebrand, Röhr, and Steinmetz state that only 133 men were rescued from the ship.
