= HMS Raglan =

British Royal Navy Abercrombie-class warship (1915–1918)

Coordinates: 40°14′N 25°58′E

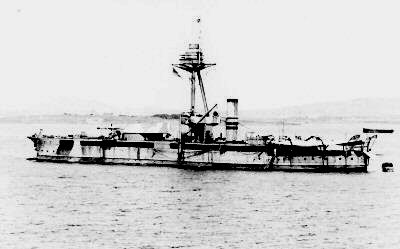
- HMS Raglan

History

United Kingdom
- Name: Raglan
- Namesake: FitzRoy Somerset, 1st Baron Raglan
- Operator: Royal Navy
- Builder: Harland & Wolff, Govan
- Yard number: 476
- Laid down: 1 December 1914
- Launched: 29 April 1915
- Completed: 24 June 1915
- Commissioned: May 1915
- Fate: Sunk, 20 January 1918

General characteristics
- Class & type: Abercrombie-class monitor
- Displacement: 6,150 long tons (6,250 t)
- Length: 334.5 ft (102.0 m)
- Beam: 90 ft (27 m)
- Draught: 10.2 ft (3.1 m)
- Propulsion: 2 × triple-expansion reciprocating steam engines; 2 x Babcock & Wilcox watertube boilers; 2 × shafts
- Speed: 6.5 kn (7.5 mph; 12.0 km/h)
- Complement: 198
- Armament: as built: 2 × 14-inch (356 mm)/45 caliber guns; 2 × 12-pounder (3-inch) guns; 1 × 3-pounder anti-aircraft gun; 1 × 2-pounder AA gun; 1918: 2 × 14-inch (356 mm)/45 caliber guns; 1 × BL 6-inch (152 mm) Mk XII guns; 2 × 12-pounder AA guns; 1 × 3-pounder AA gun; 1 × 2-pounder AA gun
- Armour: Belt: 4 in (10 cm); Bulkheads 4 in (10 cm); Barbettes: 8 in (20 cm); Turrets: 10 in (25 cm); Deck: 1–2 in (2.5–5.1 cm)
- Aircraft carried: October 1916: 1 × Short 166; September 1917: 1 × Short 184
- Aviation facilities: Fitted to carry a seaplane

HMS Raglan was a First World War Royal Navy Abercrombie-class monitor, which was sunk during the Battle of Imbros in January 1918.

== Design ==
On 3 November 1914, Charles M. Schwab of Bethlehem Steel offered Winston Churchill, then First Lord of the Admiralty, the use of eight 14-inch (356 mm)/45 cal BL MK II guns in twin gun turrets, originally destined for the Greek battleship Salamis. These turrets could not be delivered to the German builders, due to the British blockade. The Royal Navy immediately designed a class of monitors, designed for shore bombardment, to use the turrets.

== Construction ==
Raglan was laid down at the Harland & Wolff Ltd shipyard at Govan on 1 December 1914. The ship was named Robert E Lee in honour of the CSA General Robert E Lee, however as the United States was still neutral, the ship was hurriedly renamed HMS M3 on 31 May 1915. She was then named HMS Lord Raglan on 20 June 1915 and again renamed HMS Raglan on 23 June 1915.

== Career ==
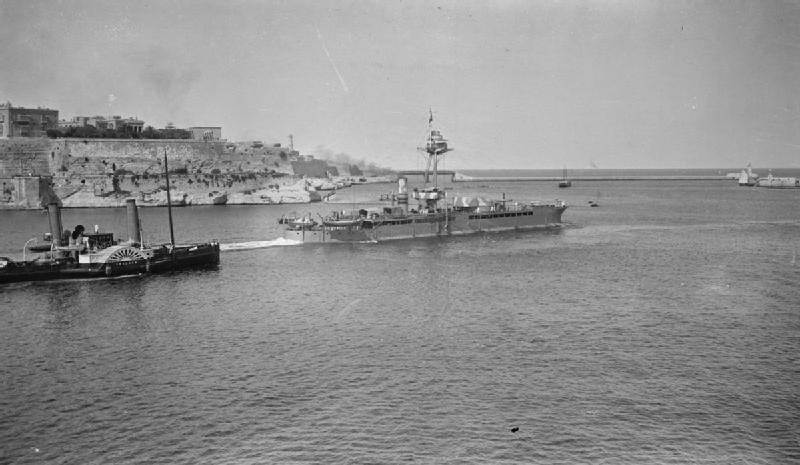
Raglan leaving Malta for Brindisi during the First World War.

Raglan sailed for the Dardanelles campaign in June 1915. She remained in the Eastern Mediterranean, based at Imbros. On 29 October, Raglan took part in the Third Battle of Gaza.

On 20 January 1918, while the battleships Agamemnon and Lord Nelson were absent, Raglan and other members of the Detached Squadron of the Aegean Squadron were attacked by the Turkish battlecruiser Yavuz Sultan Selim (formerly German battlecruiser SMS Goeben), the light cruiser Midilli (formerly German light cruiser SMS Breslau) and four destroyers. Raglan was sunk with the loss of 127 lives. The monitor M28 was also sunk in the same battle. Midilli and Yavuz Sultan Selim ran into a minefield while withdrawing; Midilli sank and Yavuz Sultan Selim was badly damaged.

== Bibliography ==
- Buxton, Ian (2008) [1978]. Big Gun Monitors. Seaforth Publishing. ISBN 978-1-84415-719-8.
- Dittmar, F. J. & Colledge, J. J., "British Warships 1914–1919", (Ian Allan, London, 1972), ISBN 0-7110-0380-7
- Gray, Randal (ed), "Conway's All the World's Fighting Ships 1906–1921", (Conway Maritime Press, London, 1985), ISBN 0-85177-245-5
