= Action of 10 May 1915 =

Naval battle on the Black Sea in 1915

- Part of World War I
Date	10 May 1915
Location	Black Sea, 25 miles from the Bosphorus
Result	Indecisive: Russian operations disrupted

Belligerents
Russian Empire	Ottoman Empire

Commanders and leaders
(Russian Empire) Andrei Eberhardt	(Ottoman Empire) (German Empire) Richard Ackermann

Strength
5 pre-dreadnought battleships	1 battlecruiser

Casualties and losses
None	1 battlecruiser lightly damaged

The action of 10 May 1915, or Battle of the Bosporus, was a naval encounter between the Russian pre-dreadnought squadron and the Ottoman battlecruiser Yavuz Sultan Selim in the Black Sea, north of the Bosporus. After a brief exchange of fire the Ottomans withdrew. The battle took place during the main operation of the Black Sea Fleet aimed at shelling the Bosporus fortifications. The action of the battlecruiser led to the interruption of the operation, but it did not manage to inflict significant damage to the Russian fleet, suffering only minor damage itself.

== Background ==
After the outbreak of hostilities between Russia and the Ottoman Empire on 29 October 1914, naval operations in the Black Sea primarily involved shelling coastal targets and laying mines. The core of the Russian fleet in this area consisted of five outdated battleships of the pre-dreadnought generation, each armed with four 305 mm guns, except for the weaker Rostislav with 254 mm guns. The main adversary of the Russian Black Sea Fleet was the German battlecruiser Goeben, which, after breaking through to Constantinople along with the cruiser Breslau, was formally incorporated into the Ottoman navy as Yavuz Sultan Selim, although it was still known in practice by its original name. It significantly surpassed each of the Russian ships existing at the beginning of the war in terms of speed, armor and artillery, which included 10 guns of 28 cm caliber, (Note: The Germans specified the caliber of the guns in centimeters; the actual caliber was 283 mm. (DiGiulian, Tony. "Germany 28 cm/50 (11") SK L/50". navweaps.com.)) with a higher rate of fire than the Russian heavy guns. This forced the Russians to operate in groups consisting of at least three battleships to equalize the odds in artillery combat. Additionally, due to the older construction of the Russian battleships, each hit could have serious consequences for them, especially in long-range duels, when steeply falling shells could penetrate the deck. The first inconclusive battle between the Black Sea Fleet and the Yavuz Sultan Selim occurred on 18 November 1914, near Cape Sarych, in which both sides' ships suffered damage.

Parallel to the start of the Dardanelles Campaign by the Western Entente powers, the Russian command ordered demonstrative actions to divert the attention of the Ottomans, including shelling positions and a possible local landing in the Bosporus area. To this end, on 28 March, 25 April, 2 May, and 3 May 1915, the Black Sea Fleet shelled Ottoman fortifications north of the Bosporus, also using seaplanes carried by base ships in the action. (Note: According to Langensiepen & Güleryüz (1995, p. 47), the last shelling of the Bosporus took place on May 1st and 2nd; there is no information there about shelling on April 25th.) However, these actions did not lead to significant damage. On May 6, Russian ships returned to the base in Sevastopol after the final raid, during which 10 Ottoman ships (including 4 steamers) were sunk, seriously disrupting Ottoman coal transport, and an Italian ship carrying contraband was seized. (Note: On May 1–5, 1915, the steamers Necat (1523 BRT), Yeşilirmak (865 BRT), Güzel Girit (1232 BRT), Morna (1495 BRT) were sunk, and the Amalia (413 BRT) was captured. (Langensiepen & Güleryüz (1995, p. 41))) On the same day (May 6), the best ships available to the Ottomans were sent on a raid into the Black Sea: Yavuz Sultan Selim and the cruisers Midilli and Hamidiye. On the morning of May 8, Yavuz Sultan Selim sailed along the coast of Crimea, but there were no encounters with the Russian fleet or shipping, nor was there any shelling of the coast due to limited ammunition supplies. The Ottoman ships then returned to port by evening.

Around noon on May 8, the main Russian ships left Sevastopol but encountered no enemy. Therefore, the main forces of the Black Sea Fleet set out in the afternoon for another operation to shell Ottoman positions and raid with light forces in the Ottoman coal basin around Zonguldak. The Russian squadron consisted of 5 battleships, 2 protected cruisers, an unarmored aircraft cruiser (Almaz), 15 destroyers (7 of them modern, with turbine propulsion), 6 naval trawlers (converted steamships), and the seaplane carrier Imperator Aleksandr I with 5 seaplanes (3 Curtiss and 2 M-5).

On 9 May 1915, a Russian squadron (including the cruiser Kagul and the destroyer Biespokojnyj) attacked Ottoman shipping between Kozlu and Eregli, sinking four steamers and many sailing ships. The cruiser Pamiat' Mierkurija and the destroyer Dierzkij shelled the port of Ereğli, causing fires and sinking one ship. (Note: During the raid on May 9, the ship Selanik (with 1127 GT) was heavily damaged, and it remained unrepaired for the rest of the war. Additionally, the ship Sadiç (763 GT) was damaged, and while attempting to escape, it ran aground. In the port of Ereğli, the ship Millet (812 GT) was sunk. (Kozłow (2003, p. 19), Langensiepen & Güleryüz (1995, pp. 47–48))) The Russians also attempted to land a sabotage group from a motorboat towed by a boat to cause damage in the port, but they had to retreat (without casualties) due to rifle fire.

The battlecruiser Yavuz Sultan Selim, under Captain Richard Ackermann, immediately put to sea in order to intercept the Russians. Early on the morning of 10 May, a bombardment force detached from the Russian squadron in order to attack the Bosphorus forts. This consisted of the obsolete pre-dreadnoughts Tri Sviatitelia and Panteleimon, the seaplane carriers Almaz and Imperator Alexander I, as well as a screen of destroyers and minesweepers.

After receiving reports of the shelling of Ereğli, the battleship Yavuz Sultan Selim was ordered to take action against the Russian group and left the Bosporus in the afternoon. However, by that time, the Russian ships had already left Ereğli. At 2:38 P.M., Yavuz Sultan Selim spotted the Russian submarine Tiulen on the surface and turned back, pretending to return towards the Bosporus, causing the submarine to not report the presence of the battleship. Before entering the strait, Yavuz Sultan Selim headed east, remaining in the Black Sea to locate the Russian main forces the next day and, if possible, surprise them while they were separated.

== Battle ==
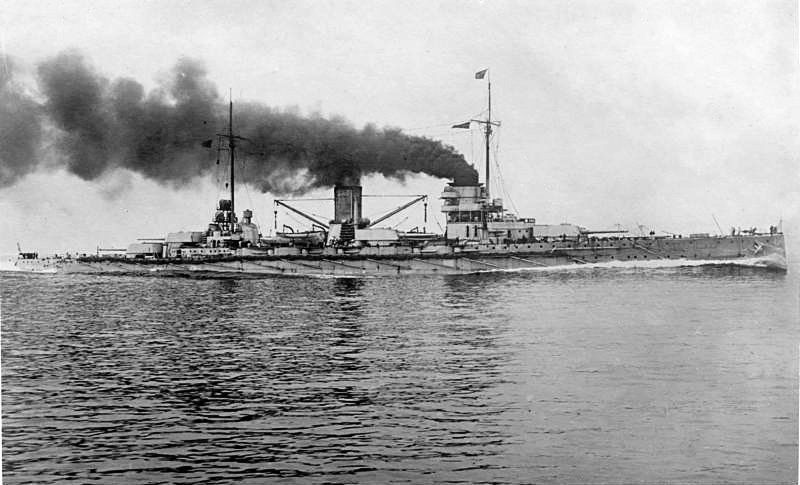
Goeben before the war

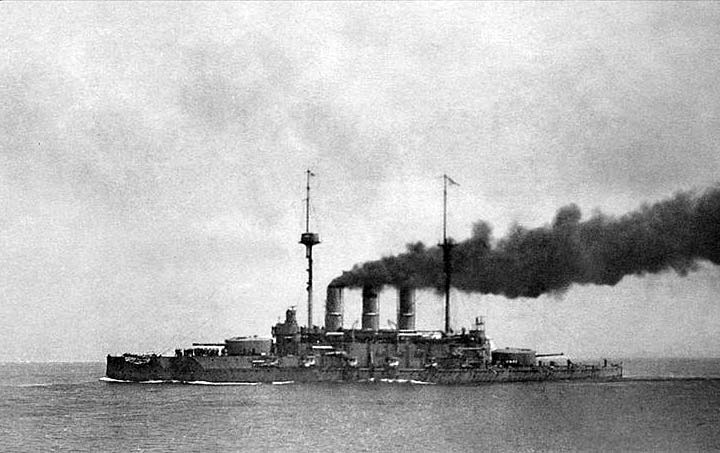
Battleship Ioann Zlatoust just before the battle on 10 May 1915

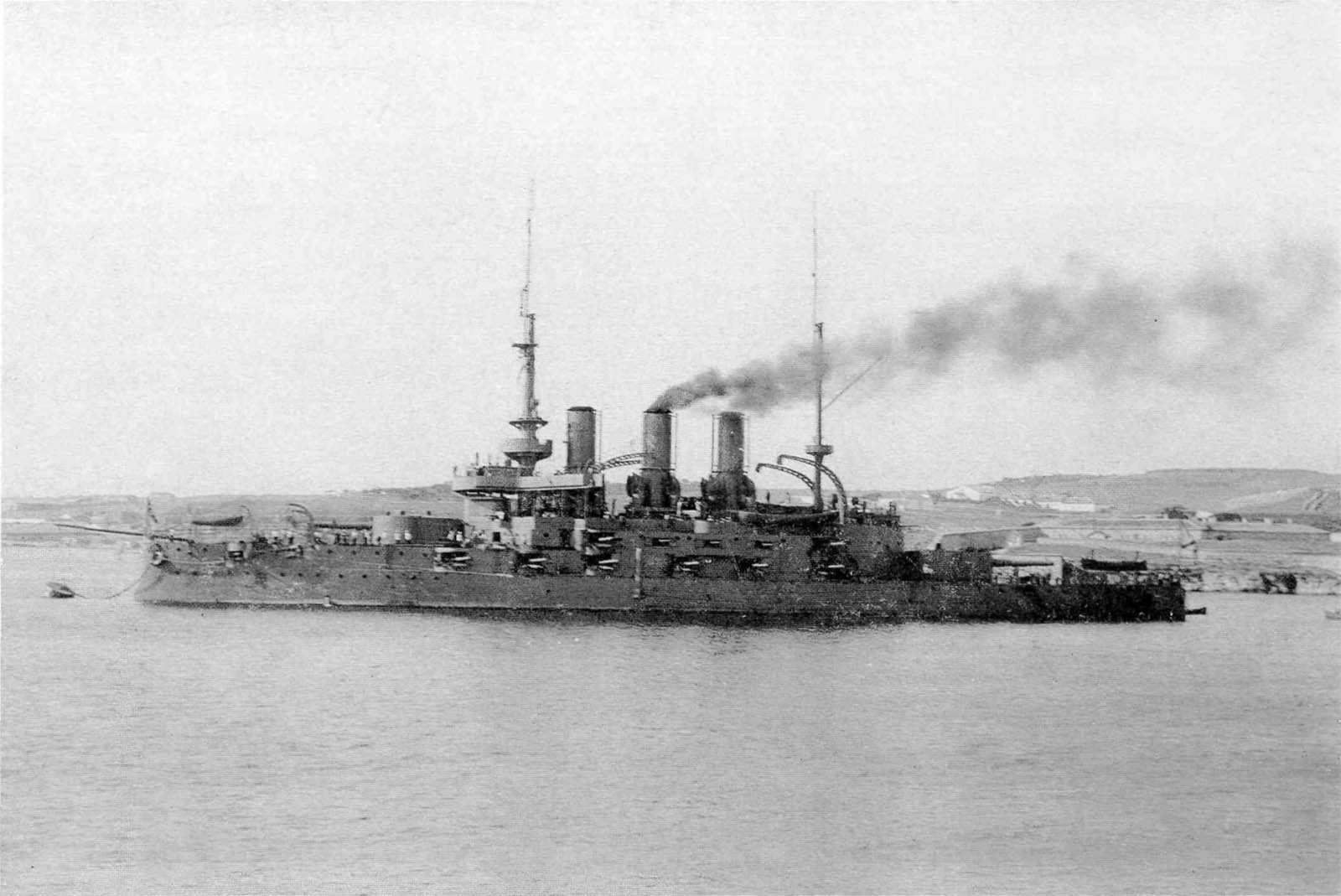
Battleship Pantielmon before the war

On May 10, at dawn, the Russian ships were about 22 miles from the Bosporus. The bombardment group consisted of the older battleship Tri Sviateitelia (under the command flag of Rear Admiral N. Putiatin, commander of the 2nd Brigade of Line Ships) and the newer Pantelimon, which replaced the weaker Rostislav due to its longer-range guns. At 5:40 A.M., the group headed towards the shore, following the minesweepers tasked with clearing the minefields, escorted by six older destroyers from the 4th and 5th Destroyer Divisions, which were also towing minesweeping gear, and two newer destroyers from the 1st Destroyer Division. The battleships Evstafi, Ioann Zlatoust, and Rostislav, along with the remaining destroyers, formed a covering group, protecting the bombardment group from the seaward side. The cruisers Kagul and Pamiat' Merkuria were sent to watch to the west and east, respectively; the latter sank a small Ottoman sailing ship carrying coal. A Curtiss seaplane was also launched into the air.

The Ottoman destroyer Nümune-i Hamiyet, acting as a guard ship at the mouth of the Bosphorus, sighted the bombardment force at 5:40 A.M. and radioed a warning to Yavuz. Captain Ackermann promptly set his ship on a course to intercept at 26 knots (48 km/h). Approaching from the east at high speed, the destroyer was detected before 7:00 A.M. by the vigilant cruiser Pamiat' Merkuria and a seaplane, which alerted the main forces. The Russian cruiser returned to the group at maximum speed to evade the faster Yavuz Sultan Selim. (Note: A humorous touch could be considered that the German ship signaled its call signs with a signal lamp: GB (Goeben). (Kozłow (2003, pp. 20–21))) Upon receiving information about the opponent, the main Russian commander, Admiral Eberhardt, directed the battleships of the covering force to the south to approach the bombardment group. Simultaneously, orders to return were given for the detached battleships, which had already moved about 15 nautical miles away.

The destroyer proceeded to engage at 7:10 A.M., firing on the minesweepers from a distance of 4.1 nautical miles. The battleships Evstafi, Ioann Zlatoust, and Rostislav engaged in battle in line-ahead formation, while Yavuz Sultan Selim changed course to parallel them, sailing on their starboard side. At 7:51 A.M., Ioann Zlatoust and Yavuz Sultan Selim opened fire on each other from a distance of 9.4 nautical miles, followed by the flagship battleship Evstafi. According to procedures developed in the fleet, Ioann Zlatoust directed the centralized fire of both battleships. Both groups exchanged fire, but initially without effect. Subsequent five-gun salvos began to surround the flagship Evstafi, flooding the rangefinders with water spouts and damaging the splinter shields and wooden elements, although no direct hits were achieved. Initially, the Russian salvos were too short, but the water spouts they caused somewhat hindered the Germans' aim. Rostislav (commanded by Captain of 1st Rank Kazimierz Porębski) did not participate in the bombardment to avoid interfering with the correction of fire for the 305mm guns of the stronger battleships. The commander of the Russian group and the entire Black Sea Fleet, Admiral Andrei Eberhardtt, skillfully maneuvered, making course and speed adjustments to make it difficult for the enemy to target. In particular, instead of increasing the speed of the column after the Germans obtained cover, he reduced it from 10 to 9 knots, causing the next salvo to fall short of Evstafi. He also facilitated the approach of the remaining battleships.

At 07:53 hours, Eberhardt's force met Yavuz sailing along a parallel course. Ackermann believed this to be the bombardment detail, though he was confused as to why he was facing three battleships instead of two. He soon realized his mistake when Tri Sviatitelia and Panteleimon joined the Russian battle line. The Ottoman battlecruiser fired 160 11-inch (279 mm) shells in the ensuing engagement, but scored no hits and caused no damage. One near miss on Evstafi sent a cascade of water over the flying bridge, drenching Admiral Eberhardt and his staff. In return, the Russians landed one heavy caliber shell on Yavuz's forecastle, and another on her forward armoured belt. Outnumbered and outgunned, Captain Ackermann ordered his ship to disengage at 08:12. The Russians pursued the battlecruiser to the north before it doubled back and returned to Ottoman waters.

During the battle, around 8:05 A.M., the Russian squadron was joined by the battleships Tri Sviatitelia and Panteleimon, sailing at maximum speed (Panteleimon even surpassed the flagship of the 2nd Brigade, reaching a speed of 17.5 knots at the end of the maneuver – faster than during trials). As Panteleimon caught up with the rear Rostislav, it independently opened fire with its 305 mm guns and achieved a hit with the second salvo fired at close to maximum effective range, about 10.4 nautical miles away, at 8:13 A.M. The shell hit the left side of Yavuz Sultan Selim amidships, below the waterline, tearing apart at the lower edge of the armor belt. This caused localized flooding of a bulkhead corridor (without affecting the speed of the battlecruiser) and disabling one of the 15 cm guns. In the next few minutes, Panteleimon, followed by Tri Sviatitelia, took their positions ahead of the retreating Rostislav in the line of battle. Admiral Eberhardt then ordered a slight turn to the right, trying to reduce the distance, and the engagement distance decreased to 7.3 nautical miles. Russian destroyers remained on the left side of the battleships, ready for a potential torpedo attack. Yavuz Sultan Selim was hit by two more shells, in the bow and in the torpedo net compartment, which hung overboard. These shells also did not cause significant damage, but at 8:16 A.M., Yavuz Sultan Selim broke off the engagement and turned to the right. The German commander, attempting to draw the Russians away from the Bosporus, headed north, maintaining a distance of 12–13 nautical miles. The Russian battleship squadron pursued Yavuz Sultan Selim for several more hours, hoping that the damage would reduce its speed. Eventually, however, Yavuz Sultan Selim, after turning eastward, accelerated and easily escaped from its pursuers, disappearing from sight around 3 P.M.

Pantelimon also fired seven shots at a larger ship observed deeper in the strait (identified as a Turgut Reis-class battleship). The protected cruiser Pamiat Merkuria then spotted Yavuz and reported it to the fleet, giving the bombardment force time to break off before it was sighted.

The reversal of the bombardment group on the opposite course took 18 minutes due to the need to turn in the narrow, mine-swept channel. At 7:41 A.M., upon reaching the shallower waters where mine barriers could be present, the battleships of the main force turned north again, with the enemy approaching from the starboard side at a distance of about 15 nautical miles. Due to the surprise of the divided Russian forces, the Germans had a potential opportunity to achieve victory, even over the entire Russian squadron.

Cruising 25 miles (40 km) off of the Bosphorus at 5 knots (9.3 km/h) was Russian Admiral Andrei Eberhardt's covering force, consisting of the newer pre-dreadnoughts Evstafi (the flagship), Ioann Zlatoust, and Rostislav. Ackermann was unaware of this, and ran right into the squadron.

== Aftermath ==
To support Yavuz Sultan Selim, upon sighting the Russian fleet near the Bosporus, the commander of the Ottoman fleet – German Rear Admiral Wilhelm Souchon – ordered steam to be raised and also sent out the cruiser Midilli. However, Midilli only managed to arrive at the scene around noon, after the Russians had departed. To protect the returning cruisers from potential submarines from the Bosporus, the Ottoman torpedo cruiser Peyk-i Şevket and the destroyer Yadigar-i Millet were also sent out. However, these units did not encounter any enemy vessels, as Tiulen left patrol due to engine problems, and Nierpa, sent as a replacement, did not arrive in time.

The Russian admiral considered sending the minesweepers back to base and returning with the main force to the Bosporus, but a nocturnal storm caused the entire fleet to return to Sevastopol on May 11th.

The German-Ottoman side interrupted the Russian operation to shell the Bosporus fortifications, but despite the favorable tactical situation, they failed to inflict any damage on the enemy fleet. The command of the Russian squadron and its maneuvering by Admiral Eberhardt, which led to the effective combination of striking forces and hindered the German gunners' targeting, are highly praised. Although the Germans did not achieve any hits with 126 fired 28 cm caliber shells, (Note: Kozłow (2003, p. 27). According to Gribowskij (1996, p. 33) – 160 28 cm shells.) their fire was initially assessed by the Russians as accurate, well-focused, and skillfully conducted. Despite the tactical victory, some criticism arose due to the limited effectiveness of the Russian shelling, considering the number of shells fired. Evstafi fired 60 rounds of 305 mm and 32 rounds of 203 mm, Ioann Zlatoust fired 75 rounds of 305 mm and 4 rounds of 203 mm, Panteleimon fired 16 rounds of 305 mm, and Tri Sviatitelia fired 13 rounds of 305 mm (a total of 164 rounds of the main caliber and 36 rounds of 203 mm caliber – approximately 1.5% hits). (Note: According to Kozłow (2003, p. 26). Gribowskij (1996, p. 33) stated that the first three battleships fired 156 rounds of 305 mm (without a detailed breakdown), and together with Tri Svyatitelya – 169 rounds.) The application of centralized fire control techniques in practice did not meet expectations. The decision to significantly separate the bombardment group from the covering group was also criticized, as it posed a risk of destruction to either group, which did not occur due to the fortunate course of the battle and skillful further command. Despite this, the fleet's actions were deemed a success, and some Russian officers and sailors – especially those from the battleship Pantaleimon – received decorations. (Note: Among others, the captain of the Pantaleimon Captain of the 1st Rank M. Kas'kov received the Golden Weapon for Bravery, artillery officer W. Malchikovsky was promoted to senior lieutenant, awarded the Order of Saint Anna 3rd Class with swords and the Order of Saint Stanislaus 2nd Class, and Admiral Eberhardt himself received swords to the Order of Saint Vladimir 2nd Class. (Kozłow (2003, p. 26)))

The battle of the Bosporus was one of the two largest naval engagements in the Black Sea during World War I, alongside the Battle of Cape Sarych, involving the main forces of both sides, although no ships were sunk as a result. (Note: Based on the chronology of naval actions in Langensiepen & Güleryüz (1995, pp. 44–53).)

== Units of both sides ==
(F) – flagships

# – damaged units

=== Russian Empire ===
- Main forces of the Black Sea Fleet – Admiral Andrei Eberhardtt
  - Battleship Division – Vice Admiral P. Nowickij:
    - 1st Battleship Brigade (escort group):
      - Evstafi (F/Admiral A. Eberhardt) – Captain 1st Rank (Commander) M. Fiodorowicz,
      - Ioann Zlatoust (F/Vice Admiral P. Nowickij) – Captain 1st Rank F. Winter,
      - Rostislav – Captain 1st Rank Kazimierz Porębski (Note: According to Kozłow (2003, pp. 23–24), Kazimierz Porębski was the commander of Rostislav during the battle. However, Rafaił Mielnikow in the book Eskadriennyj bronienosjec Rostislav (1893-1920) states that Porębski commanded it in 1914, and from 24 December 1914, until an unknown date, the commander was Ivan Kuznetsov.)
    - 2nd Battleship Brigade (bombardment group) – Rear Admiral N. Putiatin:
      - Tri Sviateitelia (F) – Captain 1st Rank W. Łukin,
      - Panteleimon – Captain 1st Rank Mitrofan Kas’kow
  - Cruisers: Kagul – Captain 1st Rank S. Pogulajew, Pamiat' Mierkurija – Captain 1st Rank M. Ostrogradskij, Almaz
  - 1st Destroyer Squadron – Captain 1st Rank W. Trubieckij:
    - Dierzkij (F) – Commander 2nd Rank A. Gadd, Biespokojnyj – Commander S. Bierch, Gniewnyj – Commander W. Czerkasow, Pronzitielnyj – Commander W. Borsuk
  - 2nd Destroyer Squadron (Captain 1st Rank A. Zarudnyj):
    - Gromkij (F) – Commander F. Stark, Sczastliwyj – Commander F. Klimow, Bystryj – Commander B. Bykow
  - 4th Destroyer Squadron – Commander I. Podjapolskij:
    - Lejtnant Puszczin (F) – Commander W. Gołowizin, Zutkij – Commander A. Tichmieniew, Zywuczij – Senior Lieutenant (Lieutenant Commander) J. Tumanow, Zarkij – Lieutenant W. Sobieckij
  - 5th Destroyer Squadron – Commander A. Gieziechus:
    - Zvonkiy (F) – Commander A. Gieziechus, Zorkiy – Senior Lieutenant W. Pyshnov, Zavetny – Commander W. Bubnov, Zavidny – Lieutenant P. von Stilberg
  - Sea mine party – Commander I. Engelman:
    - Minesweepers Witjaz (F), Rossija, St. Nikolai,
    - Minelayers/minesweepers Wielikaja kniaginia Ksenia, Wielikij kniaz Konstantin, Wielikij kniaz Aleksiej
  - Seaplane carrier (auxiliary cruiser) Impierator Aleksandr I – Captain 1st Rank P. Giering
- Submarine Tiulen – Senior Lieutenant P. Baczmanow

=== Ottoman Empire / Germany ===
- Battlecruiser Yavuz Sultan Selim (formerly Goeben) – Kapitän zur See (Commander) Richard Ackermann
- Destroyer Nümune-i Hamiyet – kidemli yüzbaşi (Note: The rank higher than Captain in the navy, no direct equivalent in English. (Langensiepen & Güleryüz (1995, p. 197))) Nezir Abdullah
