= Richard Ackermann =

German naval officer (1869–1930)

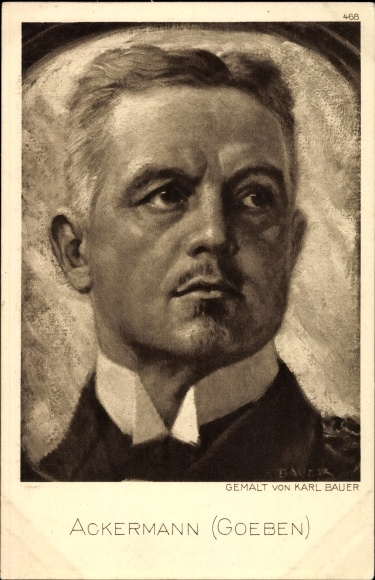
- Portrait sketch of Ackermann, 1914
- Born: November 17, 1869; Weeskenhof, East Prussia, German Empire
- Died: September 27, 1930 (aged 60); Charlottenburg, Germany
- Military career
- Allegiance: German Empire
- Branch: Imperial German Navy
- Service years: 1889–1919
- Rank: Konteradmiral
- Commands: SMS Tiger; SMS Goeben
- Awards: Order of the Red Eagle; Order of the Crown; Knight's Cross of the House Order of Hohenzollern

Richard Ackermann (17 November 1869 – 27 September 1930) was a German career naval officer who served in the Imperial German Navy from 1889 and took part in World War I, before retiring in 1919.

== Naval career ==
Richard Ackermann was born on 17 November 1869 at Weeskenhof in East Prussia (today, Rzeczna, Poland). He entered the Imperial German Navy as an officer cadet in 1889. He rose through the ranks, and as a Korvettenkapitän, commanded the gunboat SMS Tiger from June 1908 to May 1910.

Ackermann was promoted to Kapitän zur See in March 1914. He served as the commanding officer of the battlecruiser SMS Goeben from April 1914 to January 1918. He alone commanded the ship during an engagement in the Black Sea against the Imperial Russian Navy in May 1915. After the end of the war, he retired in 1919 with the brevet rank of Konteradmiral. Ackermann died on 27 September 1930 in Charlottenburg.

== Awards and decorations ==
- Order of the Red Eagle 4th Class
- Order of the Crown 2nd Class with swords
- Knight's Cross of the House Order of Hohenzollern
- Iron Cross (1914) 2nd and 1st class
- Service Award Cross of Prussia
- Knight's Cross 1st class of the Albert Order
- Hanseatic Cross of Hamburg

== Sources ==
- Hildebrand, Hans H.; Henriot, Ernest (1988). Deutschlands Admirale, 1849-1945: die militärischen Werdegänge der See-, Ingenieur-, Sanitäts-, Waffen- und Verwaltungsoffiziere im Admiralsrang (in German). Biblio Verlag. ISBN 9783764814991.
- Noppen, Ryan K. (20 July 2015). Ottoman Navy Warships 1914-18. Bloomsbury Publishing. ISBN 9781472806208.
- Staff, Gary (2014). German Battlecruisers of World War One. Seaforth Publishing. ISBN 9781848323070.
