= SMS Goeben =

German and Turkish battlecruiser (1912–1950)

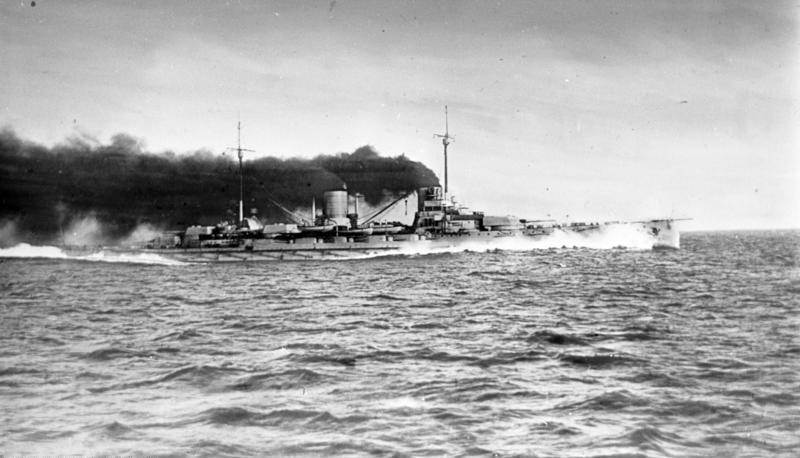
- SMS Goeben

History

German Empire
- Name: Goeben
- Namesake: August Karl von Goeben
- Ordered: 8 April 1909
- Builder: Blohm & Voss
- Laid down: 12 August 1909
- Launched: 28 March 1911
- Commissioned: 2 July 1912
- Fate: Transferred to the Ottoman Empire 16 August 1914

History

Ottoman Empire/Turkey
- Name: Yavuz Sultan Selim
- Namesake: Selim the Resolute
- Acquired: 16 August 1914
- Commissioned: 16 August 1914
- Decommissioned: 20 December 1950
- Renamed: Yavuz in 1936
- Stricken: 14 November 1954
- Fate: Scrapped in 1973–1976

General characteristics
- Class & type: Moltke-class battlecruiser
- Displacement: Design: 22,979 t (22,616 long tons); Full load: 25,400 t (25,000 long tons)
- Length: 186.6 m (612 ft 2 in)
- Beam: 29.4 m (96 ft 5 in)
- Draft: 9.19 m (30 ft 2 in)
- Installed power: 24 × water-tube boilers; 51,289 shp (38,246 kW)
- Propulsion: 4 × screw propellers; 4 × Parsons turbines
- Speed: Design: 25.5 knots (47.2 km/h; 29.3 mph)
- Range: 4,120 nmi (7,630 km; 4,740 mi) at 14 knots (26 km/h; 16 mph)
- Complement: 43 officers; 1,010 men
- Armament: 10 × 28 cm (11 in) /50 SK guns; 12 × 15 cm (5.9 in) guns; 12 × 8.8 cm (3.5 in) guns
- Armor: Belt: 76 to 280 mm (3 to 11 in); Barbettes: 230 mm (9.1 in); Gun turrets: 230 mm; Deck: 25 to 76 mm (1 to 3 in)

SMS Goeben (Note: "SMS" stands for "Seiner Majestät Schiff ", or "His Majesty's Ship" in German.) was the second of two Moltke-class battlecruisers of the Imperial German Navy, launched in 1911 and named after the German Franco-Prussian War veteran General August Karl von Goeben. Along with her sister ship, Goeben was similar to the previous German battlecruiser design, Von der Tann, but larger, with increased armor protection and two more main guns in an additional turret. Goeben and Moltke were significantly larger and better armored than the comparable British Indefatigable class. (Note: The Indefatigable-class ships displaced 22,100 t (21,800 long tons; 24,400 short tons) at full load, compared to 25,400 t (25,000 long tons; 28,000 short tons) for the Moltke-class. The Indefatigable-class ships had an armored belt between 4–6 in (100–150 mm), while Moltke's belt was 11–3 in (279–76 mm) thick.)

Several months after her commissioning in 1912, Goeben, with the light cruiser Breslau, formed the German Mediterranean Division and patrolled there during the Balkan Wars. After the outbreak of World War I on 28 July 1914, Goeben and Breslau bombarded French positions in North Africa and then evaded British naval forces in the Mediterranean and reached Constantinople. The two ships were transferred to the Ottoman Empire on 16 August 1914, and Goeben became the flagship of the Ottoman Navy as Yavuz Sultan Selim, usually shortened to Yavuz. By bombarding Russian facilities in the Black Sea, she brought Turkey into World War I on the German side. The ship operated primarily against Russian forces in the Black Sea during the war, including several inconclusive engagements with Russian battleships. She made a sortie into the Aegean in January 1918 that resulted in the Battle of Imbros, where Yavuz sank a pair of British monitors but was herself badly damaged by mines.

In 1936, Goeben was officially renamed TCG Yavuz ("Ship of the Turkish Republic Yavuz"); she carried the remains of Mustafa Kemal Atatürk from Istanbul to İzmit in 1938. Yavuz remained the flagship of the Turkish Navy until she was decommissioned in 1950. She was scrapped in 1973, after the West German government declined an invitation to buy her back from Turkey. She was the last surviving ship built by the Imperial German Navy, and the longest-serving dreadnought-type ship in any navy.

== Design ==
As the German Kaiserliche Marine (Imperial Navy) continued in its arms race with the British Royal Navy in 1907, the Reichsmarineamt (Imperial Navy Office) considered plans for the battlecruiser that was to be built for the following year. An increase in the budget raised the possibility of increasing the caliber of the main battery from the 28 cm (11 in) guns used in the previous battlecruiser, SMS Von der Tann, to 30.5 cm (12 in), but Admiral Alfred von Tirpitz, the State Secretary of the Navy, opposed the increase, preferring to add a pair of 28 cm guns instead. The Construction Department supported the change, and ultimately two ships were authorized for the 1908 and 1909 building years; Moltke was the first, followed by Goeben.

=== Characteristics ===
Plan and profile sketch of the Moltke class

Goeben was 186.6 meters (612 ft 2 in) long overall, with a beam of 29.4 m (96 ft) and a draft of 9.19 m (30 ft 2 in) fully loaded. The ship displaced 22,979 t (22,616 long tons) normally, and 25,400 t (25,000 long tons) at full load. She had a long forecastle deck that extended for most of the ship, stepping down to the main deck at the rearmost 27 cm gun turrets. The ship's superstructure consisted of a pair of conning towers, a larger one forward as the primary position, and a smaller, secondary position aft. She was fitted with a pair of pole masts for signaling and spotting purposes. Her crew consisted of 43 officers and 1,010 enlisted men.

Goeben was powered by four Parsons steam turbines that drove four screw propellers, with steam provided by twenty-four Schulz-Thornycroft coal-fired water-tube boilers. The boilers were vented through a pair of widely spaced funnels. The propulsion system was rated at 51,289 shaft horsepower (38,246 kW) and a top speed of 25.5 knots (47.2 km/h; 29.3 mph), though she exceeded this speed significantly on her trials. At 14 knots (26 km/h; 16 mph), the ship had a range of 4,120 nautical miles (7,630 km; 4,740 mi).

The ship was armed with a main battery of ten 28 cm (11 in) SK L/50 guns mounted in five twin-gun turrets; of these, one was placed forward, two were placed amidships in an en echelon arrangement, and the other two were in a superfiring pair aft. Her secondary armament consisted of twelve 15 cm (5.9 in) SK L/45 guns placed in individual casemates in the central portion of the ship. For defense against torpedo boats, she carried twelve 8.8 cm (3.5 in) SK L/45 guns, also in individual mounts in the bow, the stern, and around the forward conning tower. She was also equipped with four 50 cm (20 in) submerged torpedo tubes, one in the bow, one in the stern, and one on each broadside.

The ship's armor consisted of Krupp cemented steel. The belt was 280 mm (11 in) thick in the citadel where it covered the ship's ammunition magazines and propulsion machinery spaces. The belt tapered down to 76 mm (3 in) on either end. The deck was 25 to 76 mm (1 to 3 in) thick, sloping downward at the side to connect to the bottom edge of the belt. The main battery gun turrets had 230 mm (9.1 in) faces, and they sat atop barbettes that were equally thick.

== Service history ==
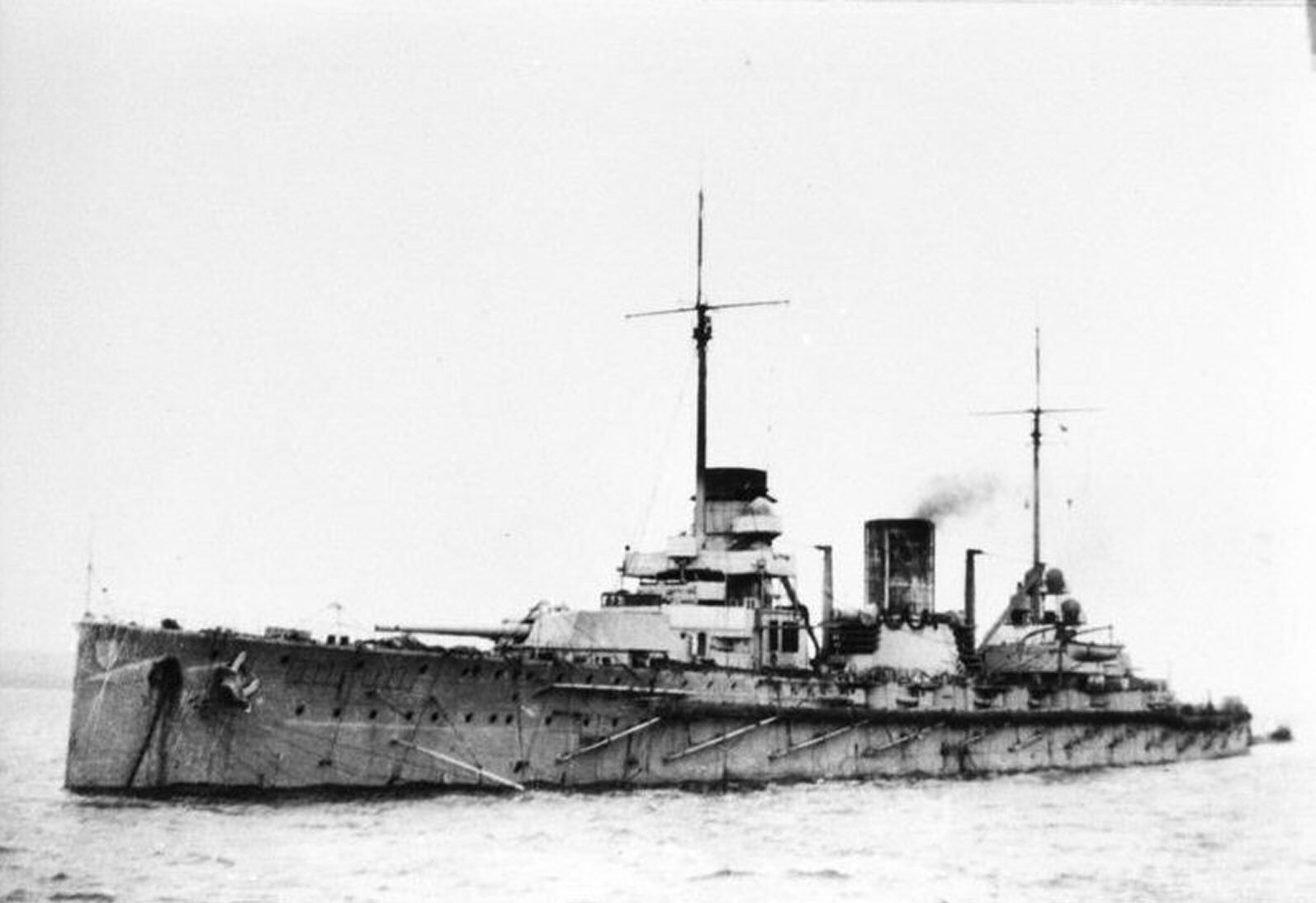
Goeben in port, date unknown

The Imperial Navy ordered Goeben, the third German battlecruiser, on 8 April 1909 under the provisional name "H" from the Blohm & Voss shipyard in Hamburg, under construction number 201. (Note: German warships were ordered under provisional names. Additions to the fleet were given a single letter; ships intended to replace older or lost vessels were ordered as "Ersatz (name of the ship to be replaced)".) Her keel was laid on 12 August; the hull was completed and the ship was launched on 28 March 1911. At the launching ceremony, the ship was christened Goeben after August Karl von Goeben, who had commanded VIII Corps during the Franco-Prussian War; the current commander of VIII Corps, General Paul von Ploetz, performed the christening. Fitting-out work followed, and she was ready to begin acceptance trials in June 1912. These were completed by the end of the month, and Goeben was commissioned into active service on 2 July under the command of Kapitän zur See (KzS—Captain at Sea) Otto Philipp. She thereafter began sea trials, but these were interrupted on 29 August by the start of the annual fleet training exercises, during which Goeben was assigned to the temporarily created II Scouting Group. On 24 September, Goeben returned to trials.

=== Mediterranean Division ===
==== 1912–1913 ====
When the First Balkan War broke out between the Balkan League and the Ottoman Empire in October 1912, the German General Staff determined that a naval Mediterranean Division (Mittelmeer-Division) was needed to project German power in the Mediterranean, and thus dispatched Goeben and the light cruiser Breslau to Constantinople. The two ships left Kiel on 4 November and arrived on 15 November 1912; the unit also included the unprotected cruiser Geier, the old station ship Loreley, and the training cruisers Hertha and Vineta. Goeben served as the flagship of the unit, commanded by Konteradmiral (KAdm—Rear Admiral) Konrad Trummler. At the time, the major European powers—German, Britain, France, Russia, and Austria-Hungary—all had interests in the region; they pressured the warring states to agree to an armistice in December, but fighting quickly resumed in February 1913. Greece captured Salonika from the Ottomans in March, and during a visit there, the Greek king, George I was assassinated. Goeben led an international fleet that escorted the Greek state yacht Amphitrite, which carried the body back to Piraeus.

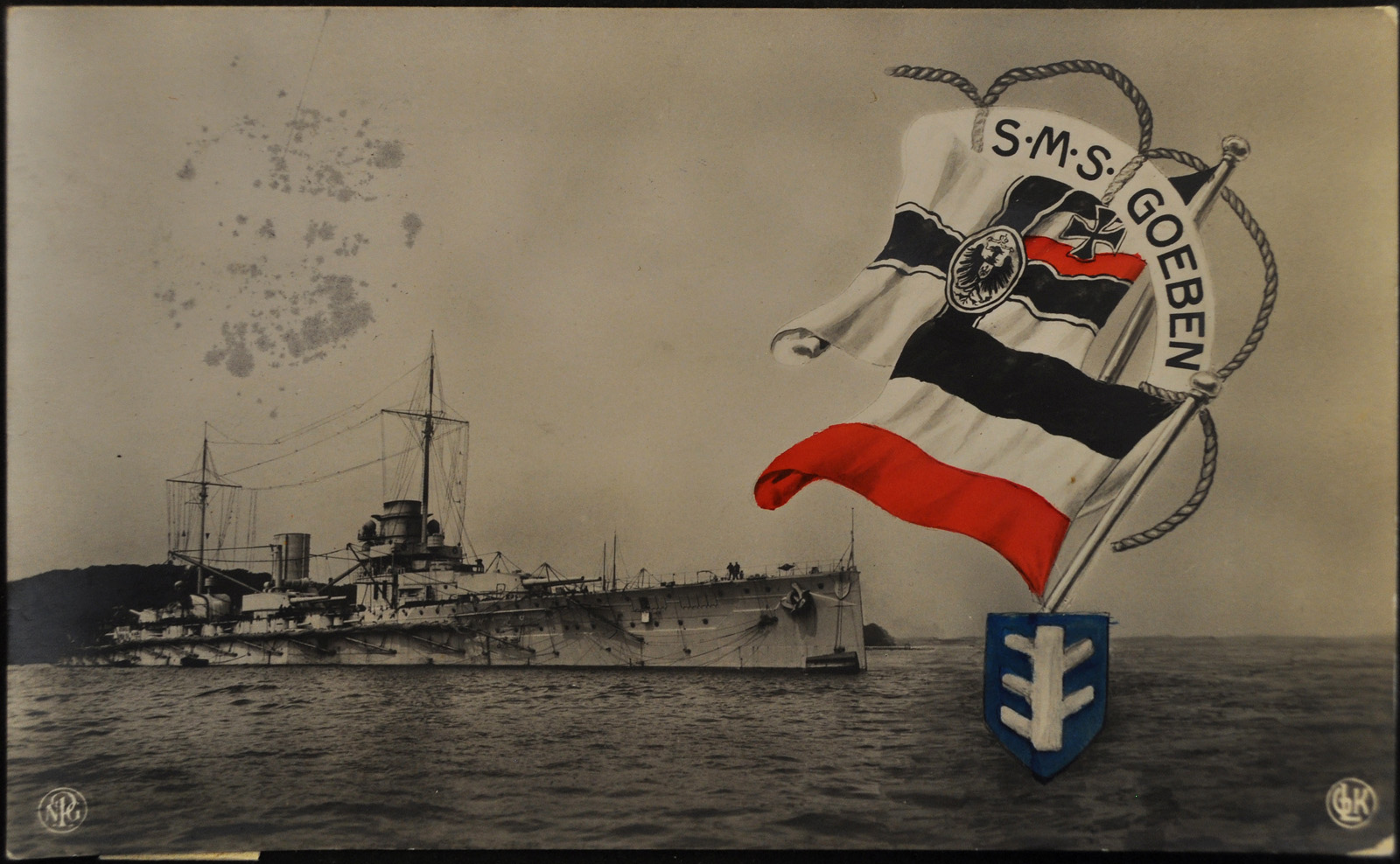
Prewar postcard depicting Goeben

Trummler detached Hertha and Vineta to return home in February 1913. Beginning in April 1913, Goeben visited many Mediterranean ports including Venice, Pola, and Naples, while Trummler sent Breslau Geier to the Albanian coast during the Siege of Scutari. The European powers had decided at the London Conference that Scutari would be awarded to the newly created Principality of Albania, but Montenegro and Serbia both claimed it for themselves and had laid siege to the city. An international fleet was assembled there to pressure Montenegro and Serbia to abandon the siege. Goeben joined the fleet off Scutari on 6 August, by which time the Mediterranean Division had been reinforced in the meantime by the cruisers Dresden and Strassburg. Following this trip, Goeben returned to Pola and remained there from 21 August to 16 October for maintenance. Soon thereafter, the First Balkan War came to an end on 3 December.

On 23 June 1913, Trummler met with Admiral Anton Haus, the commander of the Austro-Hungarian Navy, to sign an agreement for coordinated war plans in the event of a conflict with the Triple Entente (which comprised Britain, France, and Russia). The plan called for the Mediterranean Division to operate with Austro-Hungarian and Italian light forces to intercept French troop convoys bringing soldiers from French North Africa. On 29 June, the Second Balkan War broke out and the Mediterranean Division was retained in the area, though another armistice was soon signed on 30 August. The war was formally ended on 10 September with the signing of the Treaty of Bucharest, though the European powers assumed the peace was temporary. Nevertheless, Strassburg and Dresden were sent home, though the squadron was not seriously weakened, as by that time the training cruisers Hansa and Victoria Louise had arrived in the Mediterranean, and could be employed if the fighting resumed. On 23 October 1913, Konteradmiral (Rear Admiral) Wilhelm Souchon assumed command of the squadron. In December, the ship sailed to Italy for Souchon to meet with Italian naval leadership to ratify their agreements to the plans Trummler had concluded with Haus. Goeben then sailed back to Greek waters, cruising primarily in the Aegean Sea. Goeben ended the year anchored at Smyrna in the Ottoman Empire.

==== 1914 ====
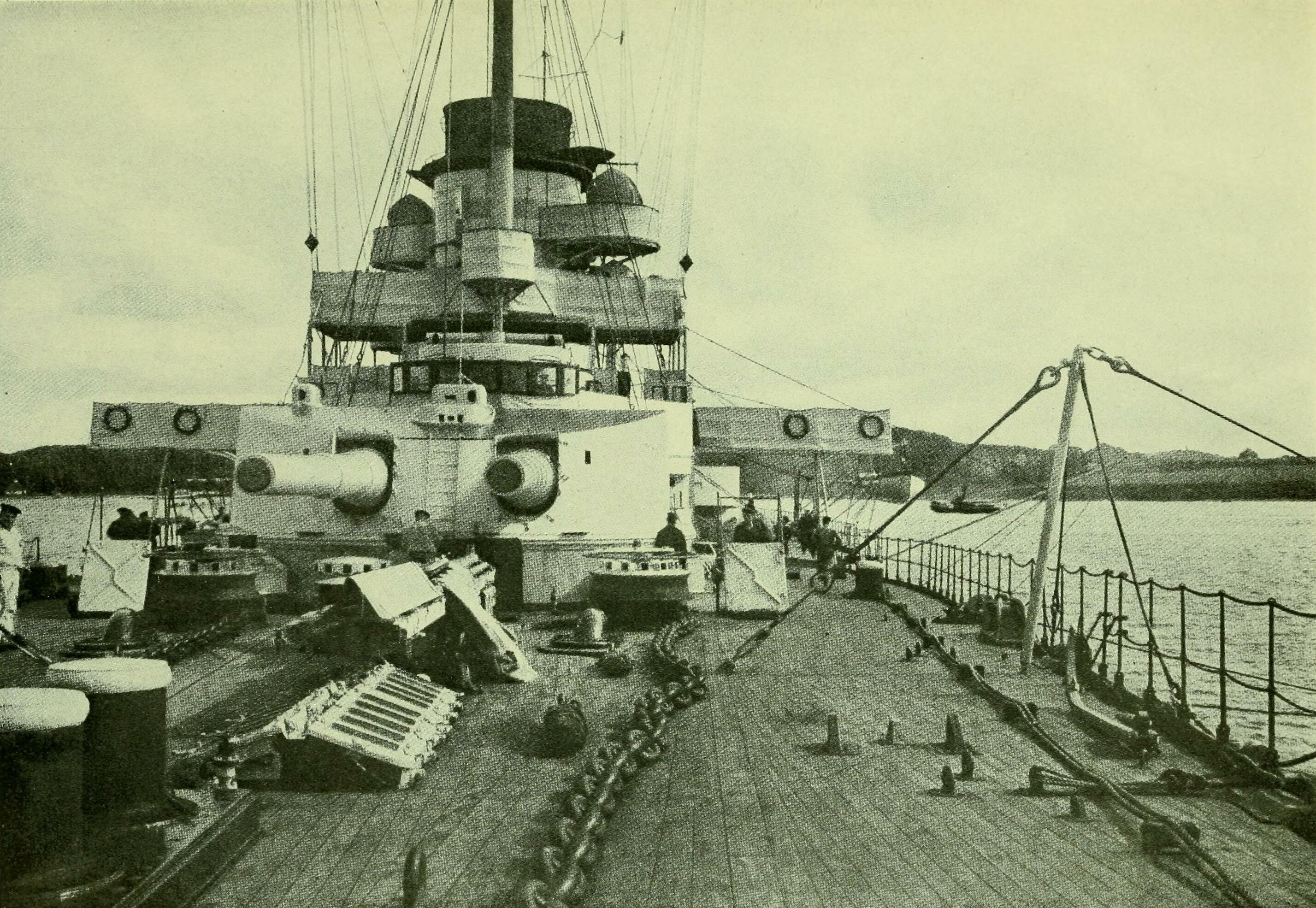
Goeben's forward main battery turret

The ship embarked on a tour of Italy on 2 January 1914, and during this time, Souchon to traveled to Rome to meet with the naval minister. Part of the purpose of the trip was to familiarize the Germans with the main Italian ports in the event of a war with the Triple Entente. In March, Goeben made another stop in Pola for a conference between Souchon and Haus. Later that month, on the 27th, the ship rendezvoused with the imperial yacht Hohenzollern during Kaiser Wilhelm II's visit to the island of Corfu. In April, KzS Richard Ackermann arrived to take command of the ship. The two ships then sailed north to Genoa, Italy, on 4 May. Five days later, Goeben met the cruiser Königsberg in Naples, which was passing through the Mediterranean. The battlecruiser then sailed to Constantinople to deliver a message to the sultan, where on 24 May, a contingent of 300 men from Goeben went ashore to help suppress a major fire in the city. Three crewmen were killed in the effort. Goeben departed on 5 June to sail to Alexandria, Egypt, in company with Breslau.

The navy made plans to replace Goeben with her sister Moltke so that the former could be returned for a major overhaul in mid-1914. The assassination of Archduke Franz Ferdinand of Austria in Sarajevo, Bosnia, on 28 June 1914 and the subsequent rise in tensions between the Great Powers made the transfer impossible. After the assassination, Souchon assessed that war was imminent between the Central Powers and the Triple Entente, and ordered his ships to make for Pola for repairs. By that time, the two training cruisers had returned home, leaving just Goeben, Breslau, and Loreley in the region. Goeben arrived in Pola on 10 July, and work on her boilers began immediately. Engineers came from Germany to work on the ship. Goeben had 4,460 boiler tubes replaced, among other repairs. Upon completion of the work, the ship departed for Messina; she met Breslau off Brindisi on 1 August. While underway on the night of 2 August, both vessels received their mobilization orders.

=== World War I ===
==== Pursuit of Goeben and Breslau ====
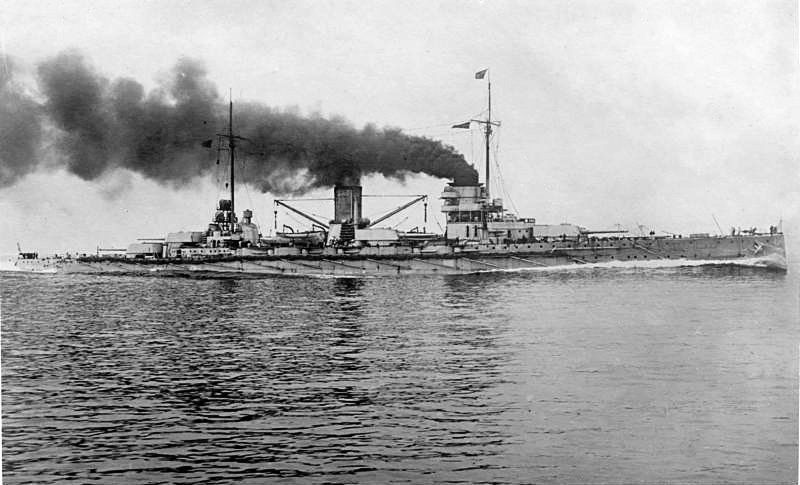
Goeben steaming at full speed

Wilhelm II had ordered that in the event of war, Goeben and Breslau should either conduct raids in the western Mediterranean to prevent the return of French troops from North Africa to Europe, or break out into the Atlantic and attempt to return to German waters, on the squadron commander's discretion. On the evening of 2 August, Souchon received word that war had begun with Russia; he was told to expect hostilities with France in the immediate future. In the absence of specific instructions from the naval command, Souchon decided to attack French North Africa in accordance with pre-war plans. Goeben and Breslau sailed from Messina at 01:00 on 3 August, bound for French North Africa. While they were en route to French Algeria, Souchon received confirmation of the declaration of war against France. At 02:35 the next morning, Souchon received orders from Tirpitz and Admiral Hugo von Pohl directing him to sail to Constantinople, in direct contravention of the Kaiser's instructions and without his knowledge. Souchon nevertheless decided to continue on and bombard the North African coast. At around 06:00 that morning, Goeben arrived off Philippeville, Algeria, and bombarded the port facilities for about 10 minutes while Breslau shelled nearby Bône. The attack prompted the French naval command to concentrate the fleet off Algiers and Oran, as they assumed Goeben would continue westward. The French also prohibited troopships from sailing independently.

Since Goeben could not reach Constantinople without coaling, Souchon headed for Messina. The Germans encountered the British battlecruisers HMS Indefatigable and Indomitable, but Germany was not yet at war with Britain and neither side opened fire. The British turned to follow Goeben and Breslau, but the German ships were able to outrun the British, and arrived in Messina by 5 August. Refueling in Messina was complicated by the declaration of Italian neutrality on 2 August. Under international law, combatant ships were permitted only 24 hours in a neutral port. Sympathetic Italian naval authorities in the port allowed Goeben and Breslau to remain in port for around 36 hours while the ships coaled from a German collier. While the Germans were in Messina, Souchon evaluated his options; he decided that attempting to break into the Adriatic Sea was hopeless, and allowing his ships to be interned by neutral Italy was unacceptable. Britain's declaration of war precluded any attempt to return to Germany, so he decided the Ottoman Empire was the best option. Souchon contacted Haus to request the support of the Austro-Hungarian fleet at the southern end of the Adriatic, but received an unclear reply. Haus was reluctant to support the Germans in the hopes that Austria-Hungary could avoid a direct conflict with Britain. He nevertheless ordered the fleet south on 7 August to cover the Germans should they decide to enter the Adriatic.

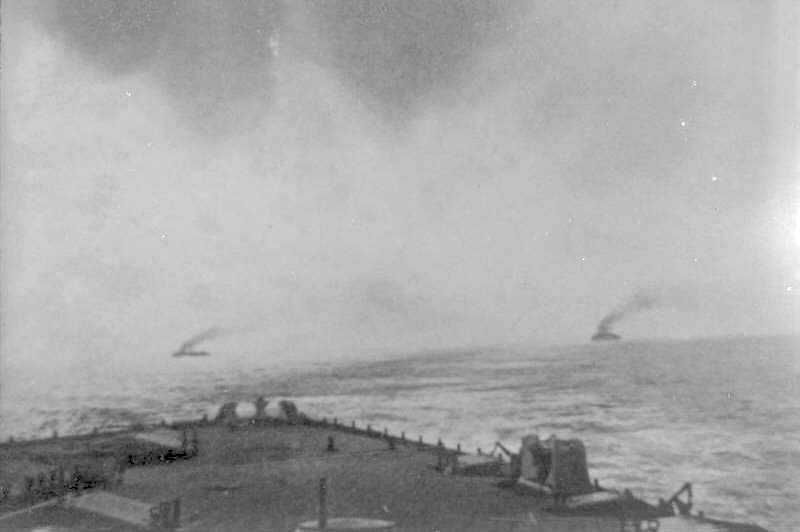
British warships seen in the distance from aboard Goeben

In the meantime, Goeben and Breslau sailed from Messina at 17:00 on 6 August. Despite the additional time to coal in Messina, Goeben's fuel stocks were not sufficient to permit the voyage to Constantinople, so Souchon arranged to rendezvous with another collier in the Aegean Sea. The French fleet remained in the western Mediterranean, since the French naval commander in the Mediterranean, Admiral Augustin Boué de Lapeyrère, was convinced the Germans would either attempt to escape to the Atlantic or join the Austrians in Pola. The two British battlecruisers were 100 miles away, while a third, Inflexible, was coaling in Bizerta, Tunisia. The only British naval force in Souchon's way was the 1st Cruiser Squadron, which consisted of the four armored cruisers Defence, Black Prince, Duke of Edinburgh and Warrior under the command of Rear Admiral Ernest Troubridge. The Germans headed initially towards the Adriatic in a feint; the move misled Troubridge, who sailed to intercept them in the mouth of the Adriatic. After realizing his mistake, Troubridge reversed course and ordered the light cruiser Dublin and two destroyers to launch a torpedo attack on the Germans. Breslau's lookouts spotted the ships, and in the darkness, she and Goeben evaded their pursuers undetected. Troubridge broke off the chase early on 7 August, convinced that any attack by his four older armored cruisers against Goeben—armed with her larger 28 cm guns—would be suicidal. Souchon's journey to Constantinople was now clear.

Goeben refilled her coal bunkers off the island of Donoussa near Naxos. During the afternoon of 10 August, the two ships entered the Dardanelles. They were met by an Ottoman picket boat, which guided them through to the Sea of Marmara. To circumvent neutrality requirements, the Ottoman government proposed that the ships be transferred to its ownership "by means of a fictitious sale." Before the Germans could approve this, the Ottomans announced on 11 August that they had purchased the ships for 80 million Marks. In a formal ceremony the two ships were commissioned in the Ottoman Navy on 16 August. On 23 September, Souchon accepted an offer to command the Turkish fleet. Goeben was renamed Yavuz Sultan Selim and Breslau was renamed Midilli; their German crews donned Ottoman uniforms and fezzes, and some Ottoman sailors came aboard to complete the "transfer".

==== Black Sea operations ====
===== 1914 =====
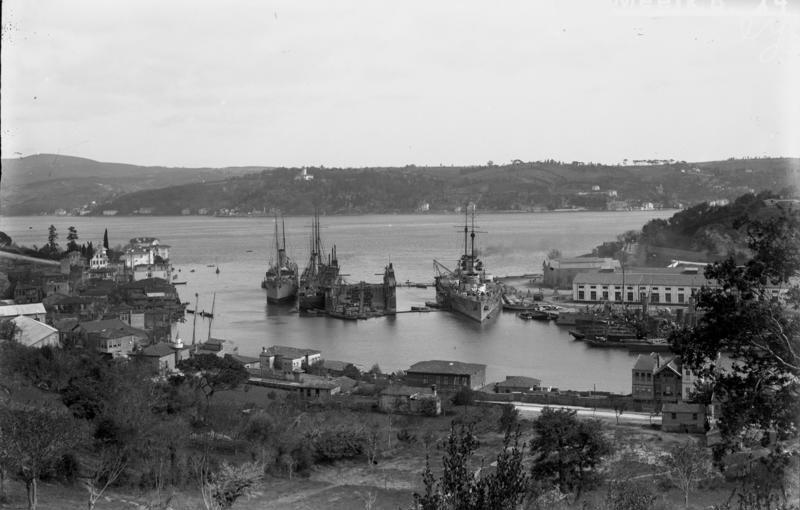
Yavuz at Istinye Bay on the European shoreline of the Bosphorus in Istanbul.

Enver Pasha, the Ottoman Minister of War, ordered offensive operations against Imperial Russia to begin on 22 October, though the two countries were not at war. On 29 October Yavuz bombarded Sevastopol in her first operation against Russia, though the Ottoman Empire was still not yet at war with the Entente; Souchon conducted the operation under Enver's direction. A 25.4 cm (10 in) shell struck the ship in the after funnel, but it failed to detonate and did negligible damage. Two other hits inflicted minor damage. The ship and her escorts passed through an inactive Russian minefield during the bombardment. As she returned to Turkish waters, Yavuz came across the Russian minelayer Prut which scuttled herself with 700 mines on board. During the engagement the escorting Russian destroyer Lieutenant Pushkin was damaged by two of Yavuz's secondary battery 15 cm (5.9 in) shells. In response to the bombardment, Russia declared war on 1 November, thus forcing the Ottomans into the wider world war. From this engagement, the Russians drew the conclusion that the entire Black Sea Fleet would have to remain consolidated so it could not be defeated in detail (one ship at a time) by Yavuz.

France and Great Britain bombarded the Turkish fortresses guarding the Dardanelles on 3 November and formally declared war two days later. During the bombardment, Yavuz and Midilli stood guard, ready to intervene if the British attempted to pass through the straits. Yavuz thereafter returned to the Black Sea. On 6 November, Yavuz and the torpedo cruiser Berk-i Satvet, operated off Sevastopol to distract the Russian fleet from troop transports moving along the Ottoman Black Sea coast.

Yavuz, escorted by Midilli, intercepted the Russian Black Sea Fleet in the Battle of Cape Sarych on 18 November, some 17 nautical miles (31 km; 20 mi) off the Crimean coastline as the Russians returned from a bombardment of Trebizond. Despite the noon hour the conditions were foggy and none of the capital ships were spotted initially. The Black Sea Fleet had experimented with concentrating fire from several ships under the control of one "master" ship before the war, and Evstafi held her fire until Ioann Zlatoust, the master ship, could see Yavuz. When the gunnery commands were finally received they showed a range over 4,000 yards (3,700 m) in excess of Evstafi's own estimate of 7,700 yards (7,000 m), so Evstafi opened fire using her own data before Yavuz turned to fire her broadside. She scored a hit with her first salvo as a 12-inch shell partially penetrated the armor casemate protecting one of Yavuz's 15-centimeter (5.9 in) secondary guns. It detonated some of the ready-use ammunition, starting a fire that filled the casemate and killed the entire gun crew. A total of thirteen men were killed and three were wounded. Yavuz returned fire and hit Evstafi in the middle funnel; the shell detonated after it passed through the funnel and destroyed the antennae for the fire-control radio, so that Evstafi could not correct Ioann Zlatoust's inaccurate range data. The other Russian ships either used Ioann Zlatoust's incorrect data or never saw Yavuz and failed to register any hits. Yavuz hit Evstafi four more times, although one shell failed to detonate, before Souchon decided to break contact after 14 minutes of combat. The four hits out of nineteen 28 cm (11 in) shells fired killed 34 men and wounded 24.

The following month, on 5–6 December, Yavuz and Midilli provided protection for troop transports, and on 10 December, Yavuz bombarded Batum. On 23 December, Yavuz and the protected cruiser Hamidiye escorted three transports to Trebizond. While returning from another transport escort operation on 26 December, Yavuz struck a mine that exploded beneath the conning tower, on the starboard side, about one nautical mile outside the Bosphorus. The explosion tore a 50-square-meter (540 sq ft) hole in the ship's hull, but the torpedo bulkhead held. Two minutes later, Yavuz struck a second mine on the port side, just forward of the main battery wing barbette; this tore open a 64-square-meter (690 sq ft) hole. The bulkhead bowed in 30 cm (12 in) but retained watertight protection of the ship's interior. However, some 600 tons of water flooded the ship. There was no dock in the Ottoman Empire large enough to service Yavuz, so temporary repairs were effected inside steel cofferdams, which were pumped out to create a dry work area around the damaged hull. The holes were patched with concrete, which held for several years before more permanent work was necessary.

===== 1915 =====
Still damaged, Yavuz sortied from the Bosphorus on 28 January and again on 7 February 1915 to help Midilli escape the Russian fleet; she also covered the return of Hamidiye. Yavuz then underwent repair work to the mine damage until May. On 1 April, with repairs incomplete, Yavuz left the Bosphorus in company with Midilli to cover the withdrawal of Hamidiye and the protected cruiser Mecidiye, which had been sent to bombard Odessa. Strong currents, however, forced the cruisers 15 miles (24 km) east to the approaches of the Dnieper-Bug Liman (bay) that led to Nikolayev. As they sailed west after a course correction, Mecidiye struck a mine and sank, so this attack had to be aborted. After Yavuz and Midilli appeared off Sevastopol and sank two cargo steamers, the Russian fleet chased them all day, and detached several destroyers after dusk to attempt a torpedo attack. Only one destroyer, Gnevny, was able to close the distance and launch an attack, which missed. Yavuz and Midilli returned to the Bosphorus unharmed.

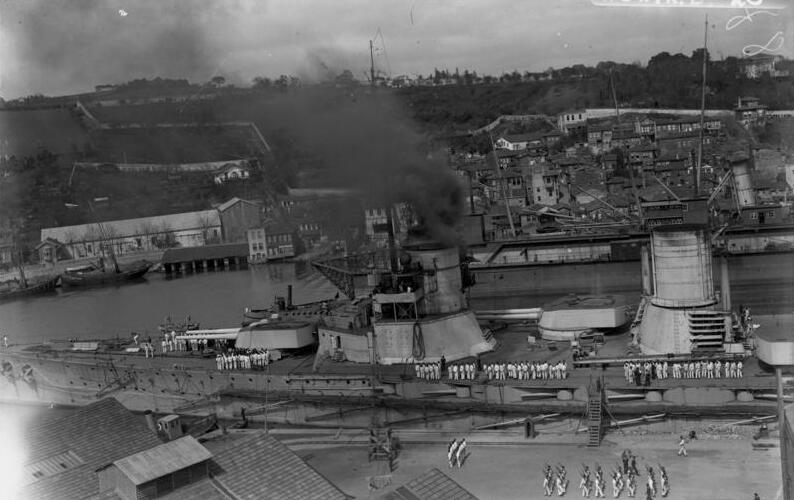
Yavuz in the Bosporus, c. 1914–1916

On 25 April, the same day the Allies landed at Gallipoli, Russian naval forces arrived off the Bosphorus and bombarded the forts guarding the strait. Two days later Yavuz Sultan Selim headed south to the Dardanelles to bombard Allied troops at Gallipoli, accompanied by the pre-dreadnought battleship Turgut Reis. They were spotted at dawn from a kite balloon as they were getting into position. When the first 15-inch (380 mm) round from the dreadnought Queen Elizabeth landed close by, Yavuz moved out of firing position, close to the cliffs, where Queen Elizabeth could not engage her. On 30 April Yavuz tried again, but was spotted from the pre-dreadnought Lord Nelson which had moved into the Dardanelles to bombard the Turkish headquarters at Çanakkale. The British ship only managed to fire five rounds before Yavuz moved out of her line of sight.

On 1 May, Yavuz sailed to the Bay of Beikos in the Bosphorus after the Russian fleet bombarded the fortifications at the mouth of the Bosphorus. Around 7 May, Yavuz sortied from the Bosphorus in search of Russian ships as far as Sevastopol, but found none. Running short on main gun ammunition, she did not bombard Sevastopol. While returning on the morning of 10 May, Yavuz's lookouts spotted two Russian pre-dreadnoughts, Tri Sviatitelia and Panteleimon, and she opened fire. Within the first ten minutes she had been hit twice, although she was not seriously damaged. Souchon disengaged and headed for the Bosphorus, pursued by Russian light forces. Later that month two of the ship's 15 cm guns were taken ashore for use there, and the four 8.8 cm guns in the aft superstructure were removed at the same time. Four 8.8 cm anti-aircraft were installed on the aft superstructure by the end of 1915.

On 18 July, Midilli struck a mine; the ship took on some 600 long tons (610 t) of water and was no longer able to escort coal convoys from Zonguldak to the Bosphorus. Yavuz was assigned to the task, and on 10 August she escorted a convoy of five coal transports, along with Hamidiye and three torpedo boats. During transit, the convoy was attacked by the Russian submarine Tyulen, which sank one of the colliers. The following day, Tyulen and another submarine tried to attack Yavuz as well, though they were unable to reach a firing position. Two Russian destroyers, Bystry and Pronzitelni, attacked a Turkish convoy escorted by Hamidiye and two torpedo boats on 5 September. Hamidiye's 15 cm (5.9 in) guns broke down during combat, and the Turks summoned Yavuz, but she arrived too late: the Turkish colliers had already been beached to avoid capture by the Russian destroyers.

On 21 September, Yavuz Sultan Selim was again sent out of the Bosphorus to drive off three Russian destroyers which had been attacking Turkish coal ships. Escort missions continued until 14 November, when the submarine Morzh nearly hit Yavuz with two torpedoes just outside the Bosphorus. Admiral Souchon decided the risk to the battlecruiser was too great, and suspended the convoy system. In its stead, only those ships fast enough to make the journey from Zonguldak to Constantinople in a single night were permitted; outside the Bosphorus they would be met by torpedo boats to defend them against the lurking submarines. By the end of the summer, the completion of two new Russian dreadnought battleships, Imperatritsa Mariya and Imperatritsa Ekaterina Velikaya, further curtailed Yavuz's activities.

===== 1916–1917 =====
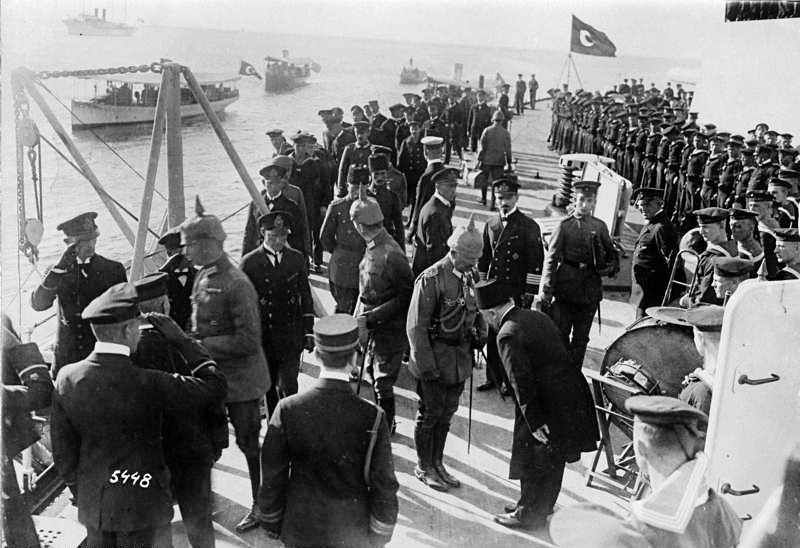
Kaiser Wilhelm II visiting Yavuz during his stay in Constantinople in October 1917 as a guest of Sultan Mehmed V, his ally in World War I.

Souchon sent Yavuz to Zonguldak on 8 January to protect an approaching empty collier from Russian destroyers in the area, but the Russians sank the transport ship before Yavuz arrived. On the return trip to the Bosphorus, Yavuz encountered Imperatritsa Ekaterina. The two ships engaged in a brief artillery duel, beginning at a range of 18,500 meters. Yavuz turned to the southwest, and in the first four minutes of the engagement, fired five salvos from her main guns. Neither ship scored any hits, though shell splinters from near misses struck Yavuz. This was the only battle between dreadnoughts on the Black Sea to ever occur. Though nominally much faster than Imperatritsa Ekaterina, the Turkish battlecruiser's bottom was badly fouled and her propeller shafts were in poor condition. This made it difficult for Yavuz to escape from the powerful Russian battleship, which was reported to have reached 23.5 kn (44 km/h; 27 mph). (Note: Langensiepen & Güleryüz make no mention of this engagement.)

Russian forces were making significant gains into Ottoman territory during the Caucasus Campaign. In an attempt to prevent further advances by the Russian army, Yavuz rushed 429 officers and men, a mountain artillery battery, machine gun and aviation units, 1,000 rifles, and 300 cases of munitions to Trebizond on 4 February. On 4 March, the Russian navy landed a detachment of some 2,100 men, along with mountain guns and horses, on either side of the port of Atina. The Turks were caught by surprise and forced to evacuate. Another landing took place at Kavata Bay, some 5 miles east of Trebizond, in June. In late June, the Turks counterattacked and penetrated around 20 miles into the Russian lines. Yavuz and Midilli conducted a series of coastal operations to support the Turkish attacks. On 4 July, Yavuz shelled the port of Tuapse, where she sank a steamer and a motor schooner. The Turkish ships sailed northward to circle back behind the Russians before the two Russian dreadnoughts left Sevastopol to try to attack them. They then returned to the Bosphorus, where Yavuz was docked for repairs to her propeller shafts until September.

Over the course of the year, the Russian Navy embarked on a campaign of offensive minelaying off the Bosporus, which hampered Ottoman operations in the Black Sea. In addition, the coal shortage continued to worsen until Souchon was forced to suspend operations by Yavuz and Midilli through 1917. Early on 10 July 1917, a Royal Naval Air Service Handley Page Type O bomber, flying from Moudros, Greece, tried to bomb Yavuz from 800 ft (240 m) with eight 112 lb (51 kg) bombs. It missed but instead sank the destroyer Yadigar-i Millet, the largest ship sunk by air during the First World War. An armistice between Russia and the Ottoman Empire was signed in December 1917 following the Bolshevik revolution. The agreement, which ended fighting in the Black Sea, was formalized in the Treaty of Brest-Litovsk in March 1918, coal started to arrive again from eastern Turkey.

===== 1918 =====
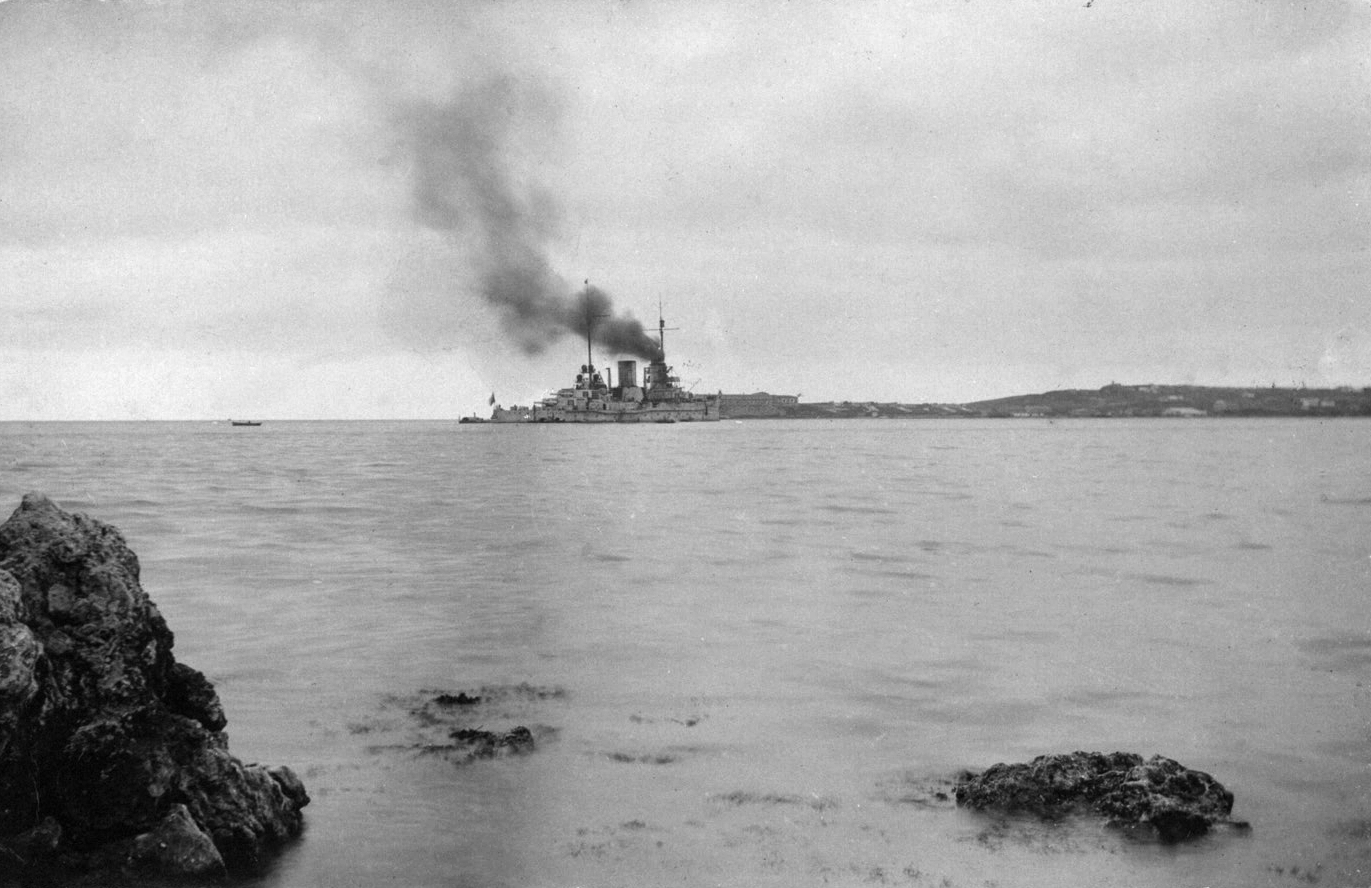
Yavuz in Sevastopol, 1918

In January 1918, KzS Albert Stoelzel relieved Ackermann as the ship's commander. On 20 January, Yavuz and Midilli left the Dardanelles under the command of Vice Admiral Hubert von Rebeur-Paschwitz, who had replaced Souchon the previous September. Rebeur-Paschwitz's intention was to draw Allied naval forces away from Palestine in support of Turkish forces there. Outside the straits, in the course of what became known as the Battle of Imbros, Yavuz surprised and sank the monitors Raglan and M28 which were at anchor and unsupported by the pre-dreadnoughts that should have been guarding them. Rebeur-Paschwitz then decided to proceed to the port of Mudros; there the British pre-dreadnought battleship Agamemnon was raising steam to attack the Turkish ships. While en route, Midilli struck several mines and sank; Yavuz hit three mines as well. Retreating to the Dardanelles and pursued by the British destroyers HMS Lizard and Tigress, she was intentionally beached near Nagara Point just outside the Dardanelles. The British attacked Yavuz with bombers from No. 2 Wing of the Royal Naval Air Service while she was grounded and hit her twice, but the bombs from the light aircraft were not heavy enough to do any serious damage. The monitor M17 attempted to shell Yavuz on the evening of 24 January, but only managed to fire ten rounds before withdrawing to escape the Turkish artillery fire. The submarine E14 was sent to destroy the damaged ship, but was too late; the old ex-German pre-dreadnought Turgut Reis had towed Yavuz off and returned her to the safety of Constantinople. Yavuz was crippled by the extensive damage; cofferdams were again built around the hull, and repairs lasted from 7 August to 19 October.

Before the repair work was carried out, Yavuz escorted the members of the Ottoman Armistice Commission to Odessa on 30 March 1918, after the Treaty of Brest-Litovsk was signed. After returning to Constantinople she sailed in May to Sevastopol where she had her hull cleaned and some leaks repaired. Yavuz and several destroyers sailed for Novorossiysk on 28 June to intern the remaining Soviet warships, but they had already been scuttled when the Turkish ships arrived. The destroyers remained, but Yavuz returned to Sevastopol. During the return trip, she carried Field Marshal Hermann von Eichhorn back to Sevastopol. The ship got underway again on 6 July and arrived back in Constantinople on 12 July; at that time, she was commanded by Korvettenkapitän (Corvette Captain) Heinrich Lampe, who had been the executive officer under Stoelzel. Two days later, the ship was laid up for the rest of the war. While in Sevastopol, dockyard workers scraped fouling from the ship's bottom. Yavuz subsequently returned to Constantinople, where from 7 August to 19 October a concrete cofferdam was installed to repair one of the three areas damaged by mines.

On 1 November, the Armistice of Mudros went into effect, ending the war for the Ottoman Empire. The German navy formally transferred ownership of the vessel to the Turkish government the next day. According to the terms of the Treaty of Sèvres between the Ottoman Empire and the Western Allies, Yavuz was to have been handed over to the Royal Navy as war reparations, but this was not done due to the Turkish War of Independence, which broke out immediately after World War I ended, as Greece attempted to seize territory from the crumbling Ottoman Empire. After modern Turkey emerged from the war victorious, the Treaty of Sèvres was discarded and the Treaty of Lausanne was signed in its place in 1923. Under this treaty, the new Turkish republic retained possession of much of its fleet, including Yavuz.

=== Post-war service ===
==== Repair and refit ====
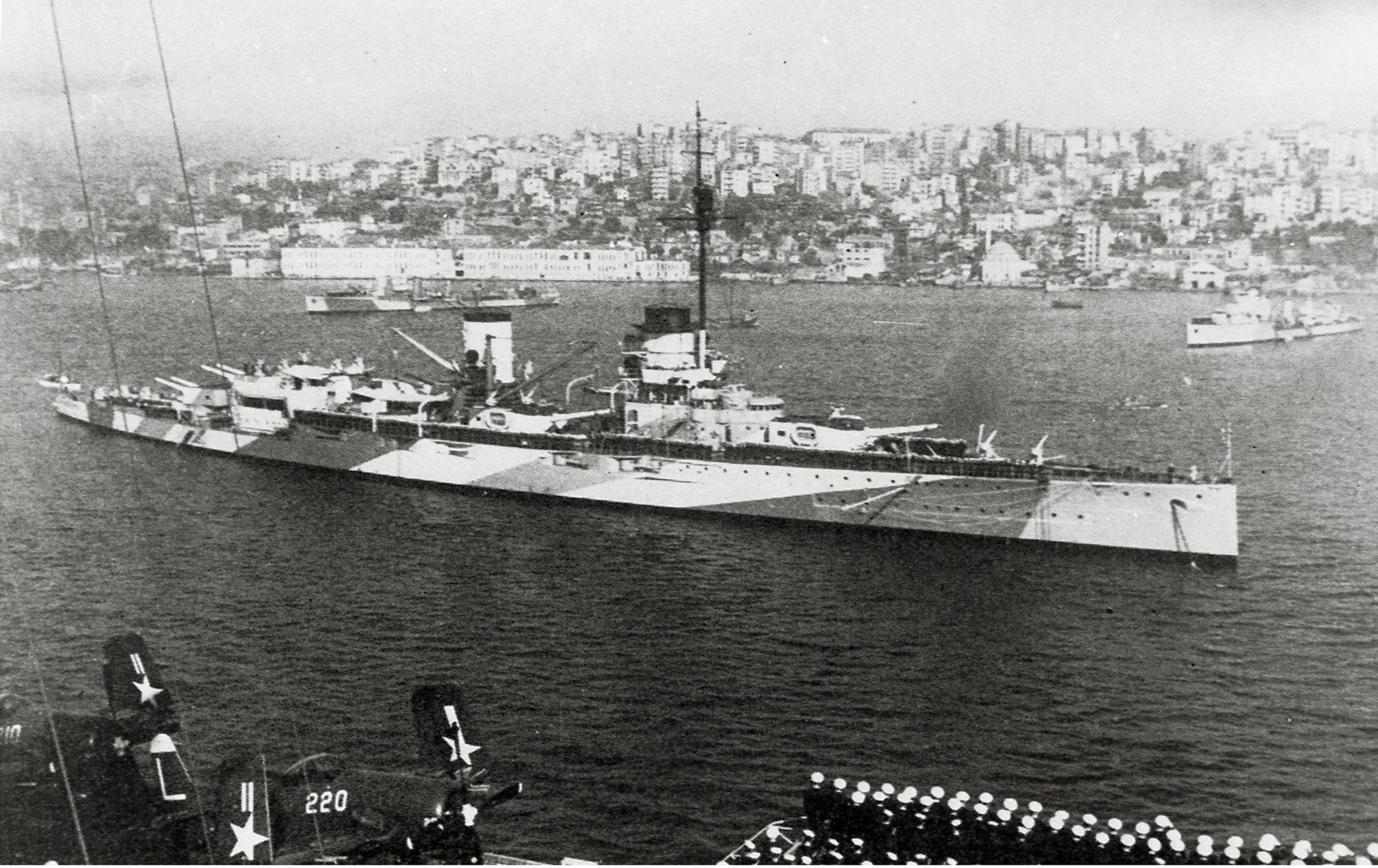
Yavuz and two Turkish destroyers at the Bosporus strait in Istanbul, viewed from the U.S. Navy aircraft carrier Leyte in 1947

During the 1920s, a commitment to refurbish Yavuz as the centerpiece of the new country's fleet was the only constant element of the various naval policies which were put forward. The battlecruiser remained in İzmit until 1926, in a neglected state: only two of her boilers worked, she could not steer or steam, and she still had two unrepaired scars from the mine damage in 1918. Enough money was raised to allow the purchase of a new 26,000-metric-ton (26,000-long-ton) floating dock from Germany, as Yavuz could not be towed anywhere without risk of her sinking in rough seas. The French company Atelier et Chantiers de St. Nazaire-Penhöet was contracted in December 1926 to oversee the subsequent refit, which was carried out by the Gölcük Naval Shipyard. Work proceeded from 1927 to 1930; it was delayed when several compartments of the dock collapsed while being pumped out. Yavuz was slightly damaged before she could be refloated and the dock had to be repaired before the repair work could begin. The Minister of Marine, Ihsan Bey (İhsan Eryavuz), was convicted of embezzlement in the resulting investigation.

Other delays were caused by fraud charges which resulted in the abolition of the Ministry of Marine. The Turkish Military's Chief of Staff, Marshal Fevzi, opposed naval construction and slowed down all naval building programs following the fraud charges. Intensive work on the battlecruiser only began after the Greek Navy conducted a large-scale naval exercise off Turkey in September 1928 and the Turkish government perceived a need to counter Greece's naval superiority. The Turks also ordered four destroyers and two submarines from Italian shipyards. The Greek government proposed a 10-year "holiday" from naval building modeled on the Washington Treaty when it learned that Yavuz was to be brought back into service, though it reserved the right to build two new cruisers. The Turkish government rejected this proposal, and claimed that the ship was intended to counter the growing strength of the Soviet Navy in the Black Sea.

Over the course of the refit, the mine damage was repaired, her displacement was increased to 23,100 t (22,700 long tons), and the hull was slightly reworked. She was reduced in length by a half meter but her beam increased by 10 cm (4 in). Yavuz was equipped with new boilers and a French fire control system for her main battery guns. Two of the 15 cm guns were removed from their casemate positions. Her armor protection was not upgraded to take the lessons of the Battle of Jutland into account, and she had only 2 inches (5.1 cm) of armor above her magazines. Yavuz was recommissioned in 1930, resuming her role as flagship of the Turkish Navy, and performed better than expected in her speed trials, reaching a speed of 27.1 knots (50.2 km/h; 31.2 mph). Her subsequent gunnery and fire control trials were also successful. The four destroyers, which were needed to protect the battlecruiser, entered service between 1931 and 1932; their performance never met the design specifications. In response to Yavuz's return to service, the Soviet Union transferred the battleship Parizhskaya Kommuna and light cruiser Profintern from the Baltic in late 1929 to ensure that the Black Sea Fleet retained parity with the Turkish Navy. The Greek government also responded by ordering two destroyers.

==== Active service ====
In 1933, she took Prime Minister İsmet İnönü from Varna to Istanbul and carried the Shah of Iran from Trebizond to Samsun the following year. Yavuz Sultan Selim had her name officially shortened to Yavuz Sultan in 1930 and then to Yavuz in 1936. Another short refit was conducted in 1938, and in November that year she carried the remains of Mustafa Kemal Atatürk from Istanbul to İzmit. She and the other ships of the navy were considered outdated by the British Naval Attache by 1937, partly due to their substandard anti-aircraft armament, but in 1938 the Turkish government began planning to expand the force. Under these plans the surface fleet was to comprise two 10,000-ton cruisers and twelve destroyers. Yavuz would be retained until the second cruiser was commissioned in 1945, and the navy expected to build a 23,000-ton ship between 1950 and 1960. The naval building program did not come about, as the foreign shipyards which were to build the ships concentrated on the needs of their own nations leading up to World War II.

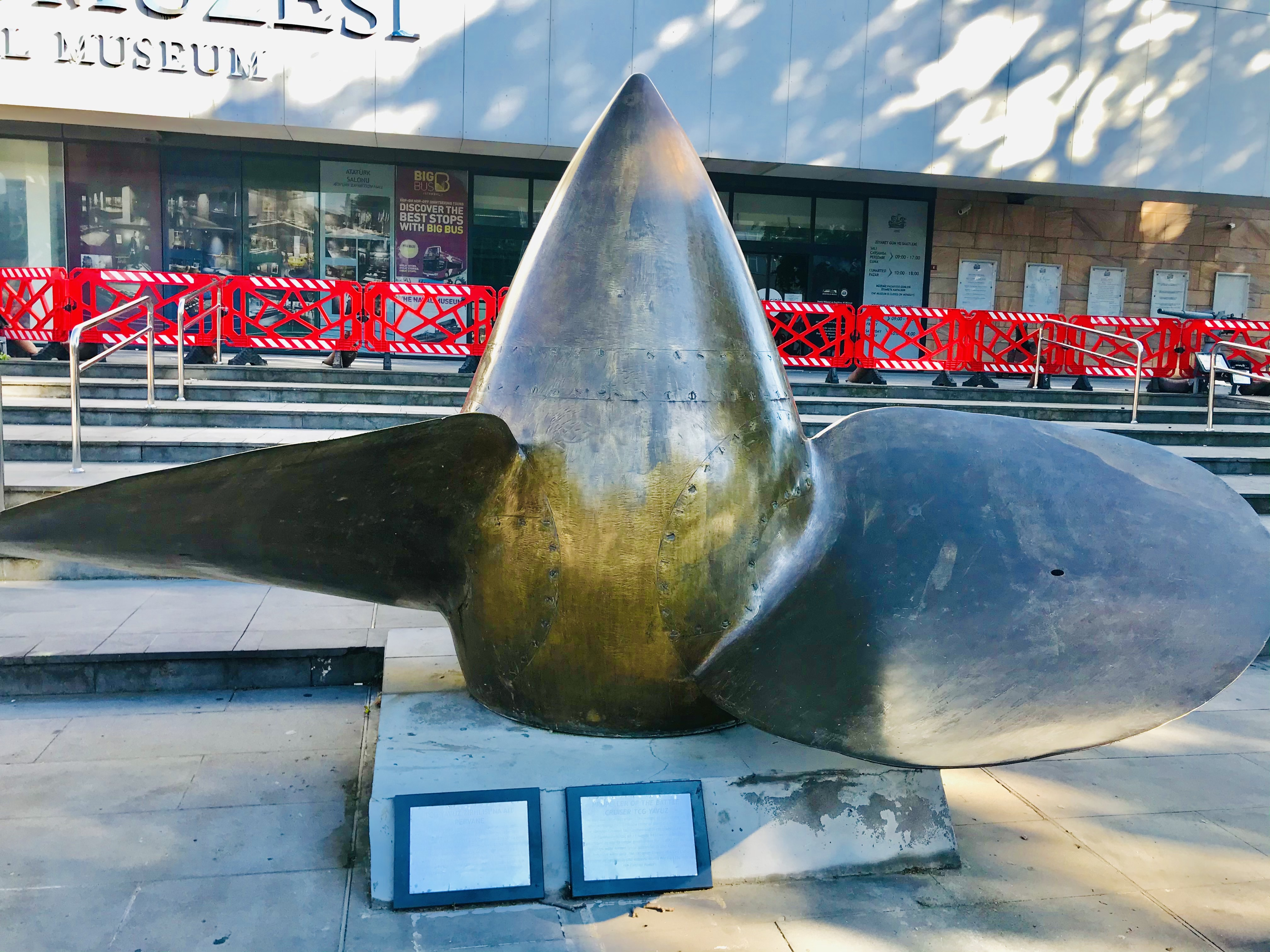
Yavuz's propeller at the Istanbul Naval Museum

Yavuz remained in service throughout World War II, but Turkey remained neutral during the conflict. Yavuz was kept at Gölcük, defended by torpedo nets and reinforced anti-aircraft units. The ship had her main mast removed to make it more difficult to determine her course and to improve fields of fire for her anti-aircraft guns. In November 1939 she and Parizhskaya Kommuna were the only capital ships in the Black Sea region, and Life magazine reported that Yavuz was superior to the Soviet ship because the latter was in poor condition. In 1941, her anti-aircraft battery was strengthened to four 88 mm (3.5 in) guns, ten 40 mm (1.6 in) guns, and four 20 mm (0.79 in) guns. These were later increased to twenty-two 40 mm guns and twenty-four 20 mm guns. Degaussing equipment was installed aboard the ship (and several other Turkish warships) in 1943 to protect them against magnetic mines.

On 5 April 1946, the American battleship USS Missouri, light cruiser Providence, and destroyer Power arrived in Istanbul to return the remains of Turkish ambassador Münir Ertegün. Yavuz greeted the ships in the Bosphorus, where she and Missouri exchanged 19-gun salutes. After 1948, the ship was stationed in either İzmit or Gölcük. The ship continued to participate in the annual fleet maneuvers that were held every September until 1950. She was decommissioned from active service on 20 December 1950 and placed in reserve; another ceremonial decommissioning was performed on 7 June 1954, and she was soon stricken from the Navy register on 14 November. When Turkey joined NATO in 1952, the ship was assigned the hull number B70. Though the ship had been removed from the naval register, she continued to be used as a stationary headquarters of the Battle Fleet Command and the Mine Fleet Command until 1960.

=== Decommissioning ===
The Turkish government offered to sell the ship to the West German government in 1963 as a museum ship, but the offer was declined due to financial reasons. Unable to afford the cost of preserving the ship itself, and with no other buyers available, Turkey sold the ship to M.K.E. Seyman in 1971 for scrapping. She was towed to the breakers on 7 June 1973, and the work was completed in February 1976. By the time of her disposal she was the last dreadnought in existence outside the United States. She was the last surviving ship built by the Imperial German Navy, and the longest-serving dreadnought-type ship in any navy.

Her decommissioning was documented in film by Turkish photographer Ara Güler, who wrote, directed, and produced the documentary Hero's End (also translated as The End of the Hero), based on a fictional account of the dismantling of the ship. The film, which he worked on between 1973 until 1975, comprises a cinematic collage put together from a number of sources. Its unusual soundtrack includes compositions by Turkish folk musician Ruhi Su, and includes historical drawings and photos, as well as Güler's own documentary footage, in which he used actors.

Several parts of the ship have been preserved, including three of her screws (which were sent to the Naval Command and to the Istanbul Naval Museum) and her foremast (which was placed at the naval academy). Some additional artefacts from the ship were sent to Germany, where they were displayed at the Historical Museum at the Mürwik Naval School in Flensburg and the Deutsches Museum in Munich. Additionally, a 6-centimetre (2.4 in) field gun that had been carried aboard the ship for use by landing parties was removed from the ship in Messina during preparations for war in August 1914 was placed on display at the La Spezia Naval Base museum.
