= Russian cruiser Almaz =

2nd-class cruiser in the Imperial Russian Navy

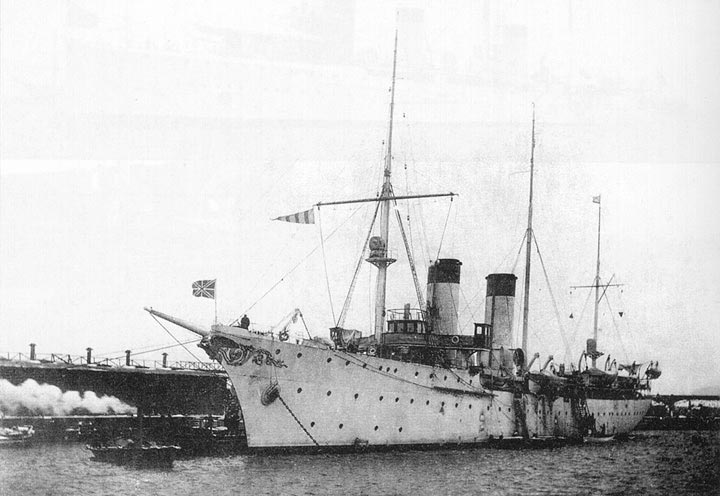
- Almaz

Class overview
- Operators: Imperial Russian Navy
- Preceded by: Pamiat Merkuria
- Succeeded by: None
- Built: 1902–1903
- In service: 1903–1934
- In commission: 1903–1920
- Planned: 1
- Completed: 1
- Scrapped: 1

History

Russian Empire
- Name: Almaz (Russian: Алмаз)
- Namesake: Diamond
- Operator: Imperial Russian Navy
- Builder: Baltic Works, Saint Petersburg
- Laid down: 25 September 1902 (Note: All dates used in this article are New Style)
- Launched: 2 June 1903
- Completed: December 1903
- Reclassified: Seaplane tender, 1915
- Fate: Scrapped 1934

General characteristics
- Type: Unprotected cruiser
- Displacement: 3,285 long tons (3,338 t)
- Length: 365 ft 8 in (111.5 m) o/a
- Beam: 43 ft 6 in (13.3 m)
- Draught: 17 ft 3 in (5.3 m)
- Installed power: 7,500 ihp (5,600 kW)
- Propulsion: 2 shafts, vertical triple expansion steam engines; 16 Belleville water-tube boilers
- Speed: 19 knots (35 km/h; 22 mph)
- Complement: 336
- Armament: 4 × 75 mm (3 in) guns; 8 × 47 mm (2 in) guns

General characteristics 1915
- Armament: 7 × 120 mm (4.7 in) guns; 4 × 76.2 mm (3 in) AA guns
- Aircraft carried: 4 flying boats

Almaz (Russian: Алмаз; "Diamond") was a 2nd-class cruiser in the Imperial Russian Navy, built by Baltic Shipyard in Saint Petersburg, Russia, as a yacht for Viceroy Yevgeni Alekseyev.

== Construction ==
Almaz had her first keel plate laid down at the Baltic Shipyard on 25 September 1902, in the presence of Tsar Nicholai II, Grand Duke Konstantin and King George I of Greece. She was launched on 2 July 1902, and completed in December that year.

== Service history ==
Almaz was commissioned into the Baltic Fleet in 1903. At the start of the Russo-Japanese War (1904–1905), she was assigned to the Baltic Fleet, and was subsequently transferred to the Second Pacific Squadron, which transited the Suez Canal under the command of Admiral Dmitry von Fölkersam. On 28 May 1905, with most of the ships in the Russian fleet destroyed or captured at the Battle of Tsushima, Almaz was the only major ship to reach Vladivostok after the battle. She returned to the Baltic Fleet after the war, serving as an aviso and temporarily as an imperial yacht in 1908. In 1911, after repairs, she was transferred to the Black Sea Fleet and at the start of World War I was rebuilt as a seaplane tender in 1914, carrying four seaplanes. She was at the Battle of Cape Sarych on 5 November 1914, and at the Action of 10 May 1915.

However, the crew of Almaz revolted in early 1918, joining the Rumcherod against the authority of the Ukrainian People's Republic and supporting the Odessa Soviet Republic. The ship became the center of a “people marine military tribunal”, where many officers of the former Imperial Russian Navy were imprisoned, tortured and executed. In September 1918, while docked as Sevastopol, Almaz was captured by the White movement forces. In 1920 she was interned at Bizerta with the remainder of Wrangel's fleet.

On 29 October 1924, she was turned over to the Soviet Union by France, and was subsequently sold to a French firm for scrap in 1934.
