= Rzeczna =

- Village
- Location within Poland
- Coordinates: 54°4′24″N 19°36′14″E
- Country: Poland
- Voivodeship: Warmian-Masurian
- County: Elbląg
- Gmina: Pasłęk
- Population: 370

Rzeczna [ˈʐɛt͡ʂna] is a village in the administrative district of Gmina Pasłęk, within Elbląg County, Warmian-Masurian Voivodeship, in northern Poland.
