= Kazimierz Porębski =

Polish naval officer, 1st commander-in-chief of inter-war Polish Navy

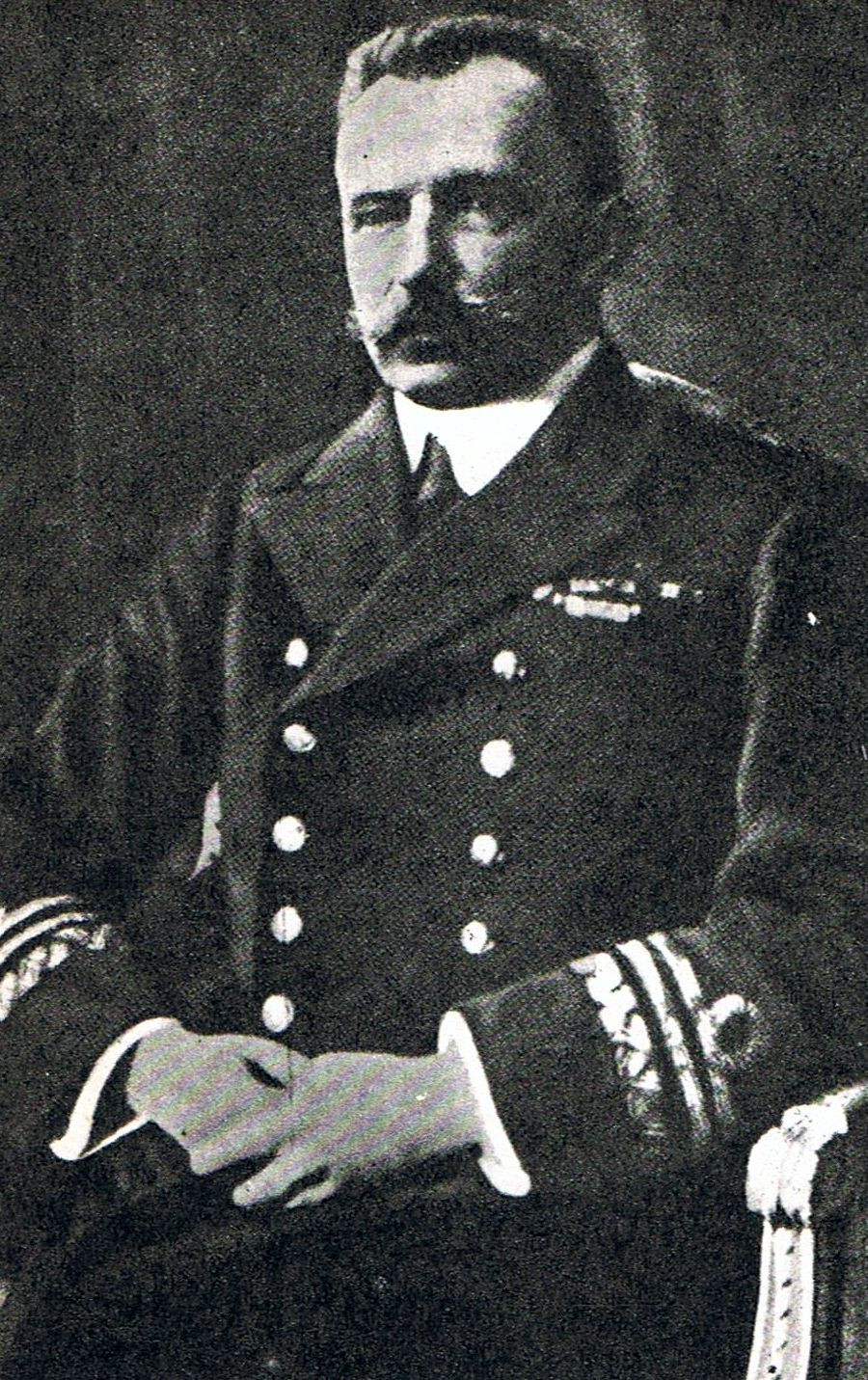
- Born: November 15, 1872; Vilna, Russian Empire
- Died: January 21, 1933 Warsaw, Poland
- Buried: Powązki Military Cemetery
- Allegiance: Russian Empire; Poland
- Branch: Imperial Russian Navy; Polish Navy
- Service years: 1889–1933
- Rank: Rear Admiral
- Commands: Polish Navy
- Conflicts: Russo-Japanese War; Battle of the Yellow Sea; Battle of Korsakov; World War I

Kazimierz Porębski (November 15, 1872 – January 21, 1933) was a Polish career naval officer who rose to the position of admiral within the Imperial Russian Navy and was subsequently the first commander-in-chief of the inter-war Polish Navy.

== Biography ==
Porębski was born in Vilnius, in what was then Vilna Governorate of the Russian Empire, to an ethnic Polish family. He entered the Sea Cadets Corps in Petrograd in 1889 and graduated as a midshipman in 1892.

== Russian Navy career ==
Porębski attended mine warfare school upon being commissioned into the Imperial Russian Navy. From 1895 to 1899, he served aboard the Dmitrii Donskoi on which he voyaged to the Mediterranean and the Far East with a visit to Nagasaki, Japan in 1896. Porebski was promoted to lieutenant on April 13, 1897, after his return to Russia, and continued his studies in mine warfare.

Porebski was assigned to the Pamiat Azova from 1899 to 1901. On December 1, 1901, he became the executive officer on the cruiser Novik, whose construction he had been sent to oversee at the Schichau-Werke shipyards in Danzig, Germany. Assigned with Novik to the Russian Pacific Fleet, he was promoted to Captain Lieutenant on April 17, 1905. Novik played an active role in the Russo-Japanese War, especially at the Battle of the Yellow Sea and the Battle of Korsakov.

After the end of the war, Porębski was promoted to lieutenant commander on December 6, 1906, and was assigned to the Russian Baltic Fleet. He briefly commanded the new cruiser, Admiral Makarov, in 1909. From 1909 to 1913, Porębski was captain of the minelayer, Yenisei. He was also promoted to the rank of captain on November 26, 1912.

During the early stages of World War I, Porębski was captain of the battleship, Imperatritsa Mariya, with the Russian Black Sea Fleet and was active in combat operations off of Bulgaria. Porębski was promoted to rear admiral on April 19, 1916, and reassigned to command the cruiser squadron of the Black Sea Fleet. He went into the reserves from November 1916, but was recalled in early 1917, and was placed in command of the fortifications guarding the Gulf of Finland. Porebski then served as head of the Maritime Department for the Northwestern Front.

== Polish Naval career ==
With the Russian Revolution, Porębski was released from service with the Russian Navy and quickly moved to the newly independent Poland, arriving in Warsaw in November 1918. He founded the predecessor of the Maritime and Colonial League, an organization dedicated to the establishment of a Polish Navy with an overseas colonial presence. From 1919, he joined the Department of Maritime Affairs in the Ministry of National Defense, initiating the Polish Merchant Navy and the Polish Naval Academy in 1920. He also was involved in the purchasing of the training sailing-ship "Lwów", and the expansion of the military harbor in Gdynia.

Porebski also participated in the symbolic Poland's Wedding to the Sea performed by Polish president General Józef Haller in early 1920. During the Polish–Soviet War (February 1919 – March 1921), Porębski commanded naval units on the Vistula River. In 1921, he was granted the rank of vice admiral and served as chairman of Maritime Affairs in the Department of the Navy. However, in 1925, he became embroiled in a political scandal involving the purchase of obsolete naval mines and was forced to resign his post. He retired from public service in 1927. A criminal investigation that was launched against him in 1928 by the Military Prosecutor's Office was eventually discontinued.

Porębski died on January 21, 1933, in Warsaw, after a long illness and was buried in the Powązki Military Cemetery.

== Promotions ==
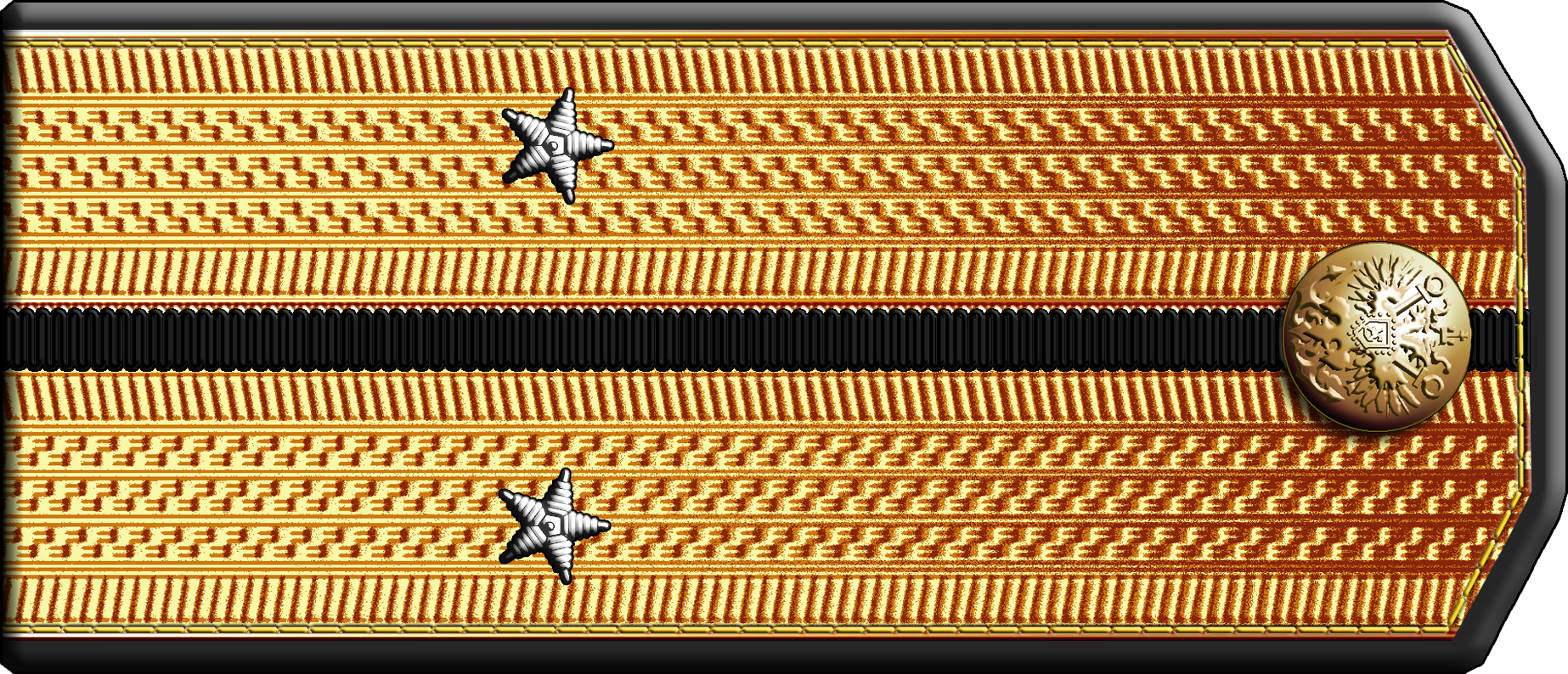
- Michman (Midshipman) - 1892
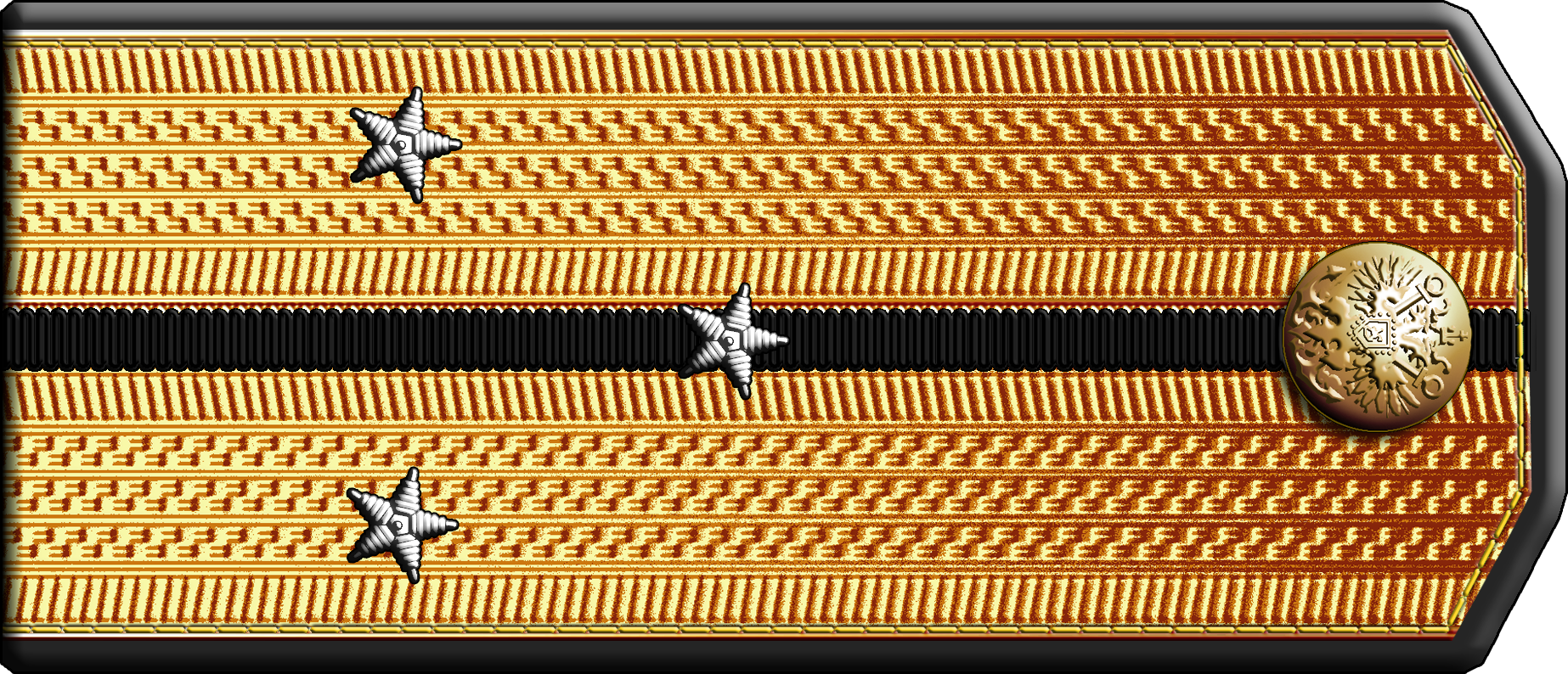
- - Leitenant (Lieutenant junior grade) - 1897
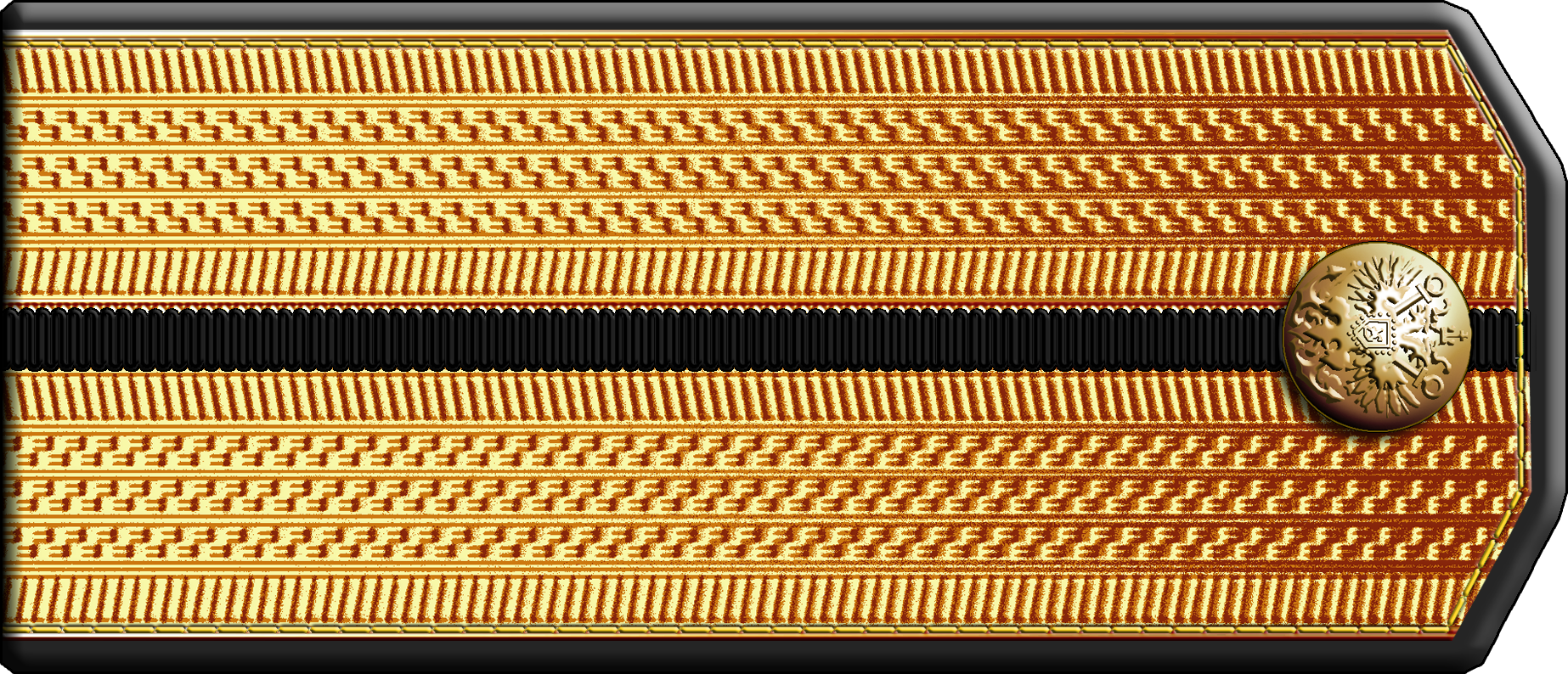
- Starshii leitenant (Lieutenant)
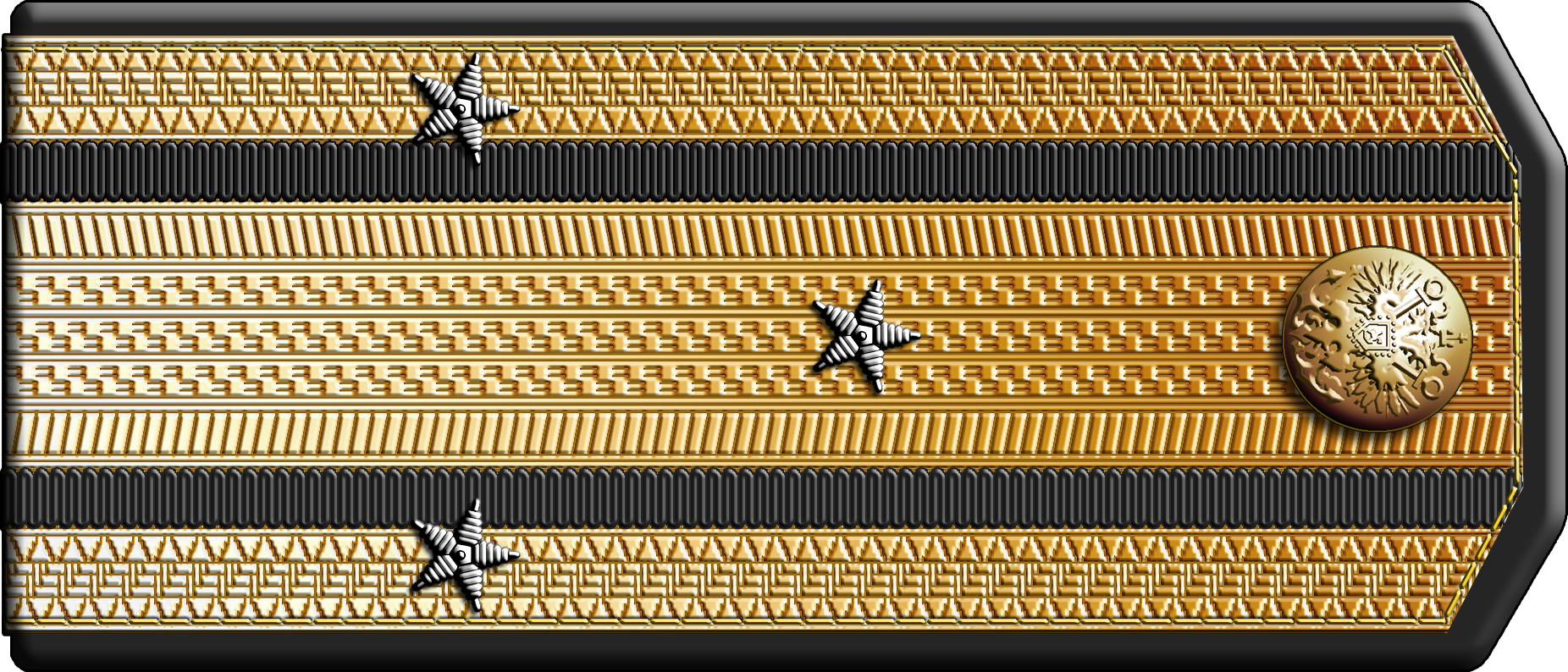
- Kapitan vtorogo ranga (Commander) - 1906
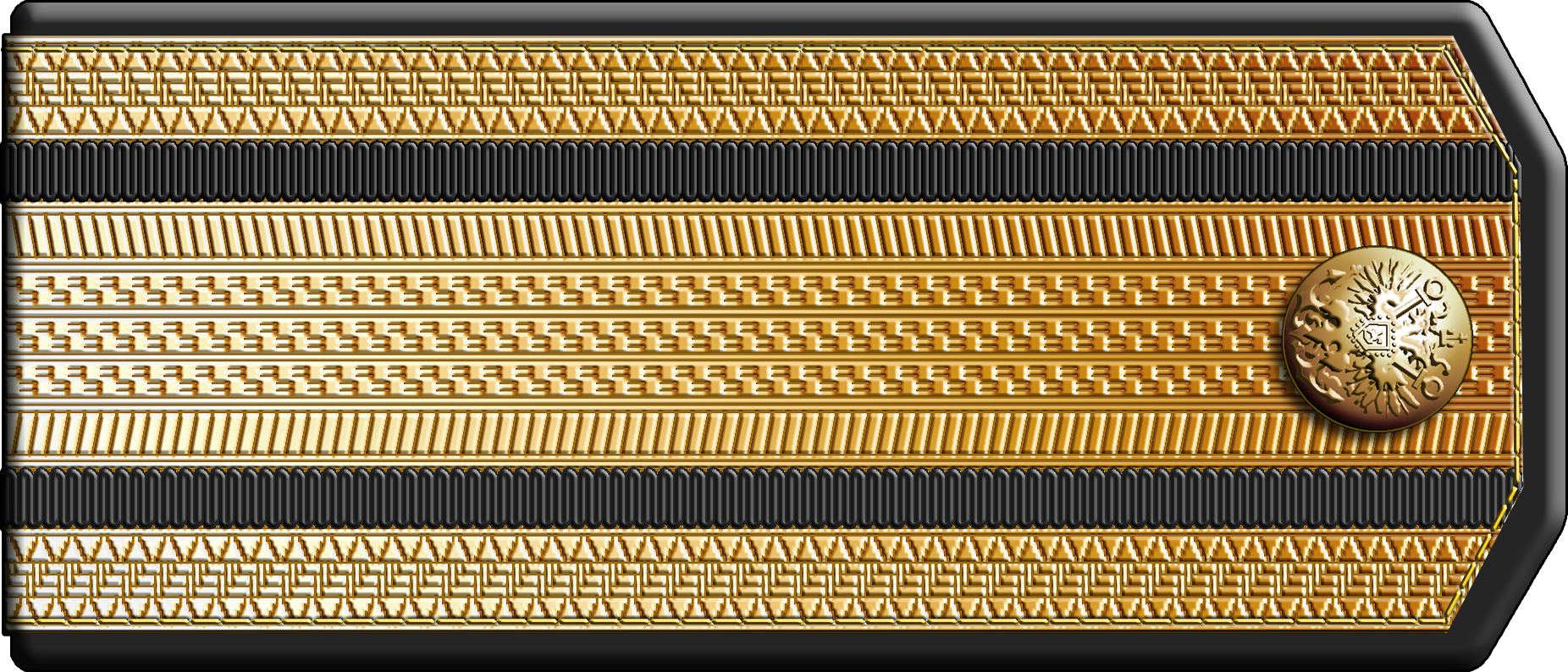
- Kapitan pervogo ranga (Captain) - 1913
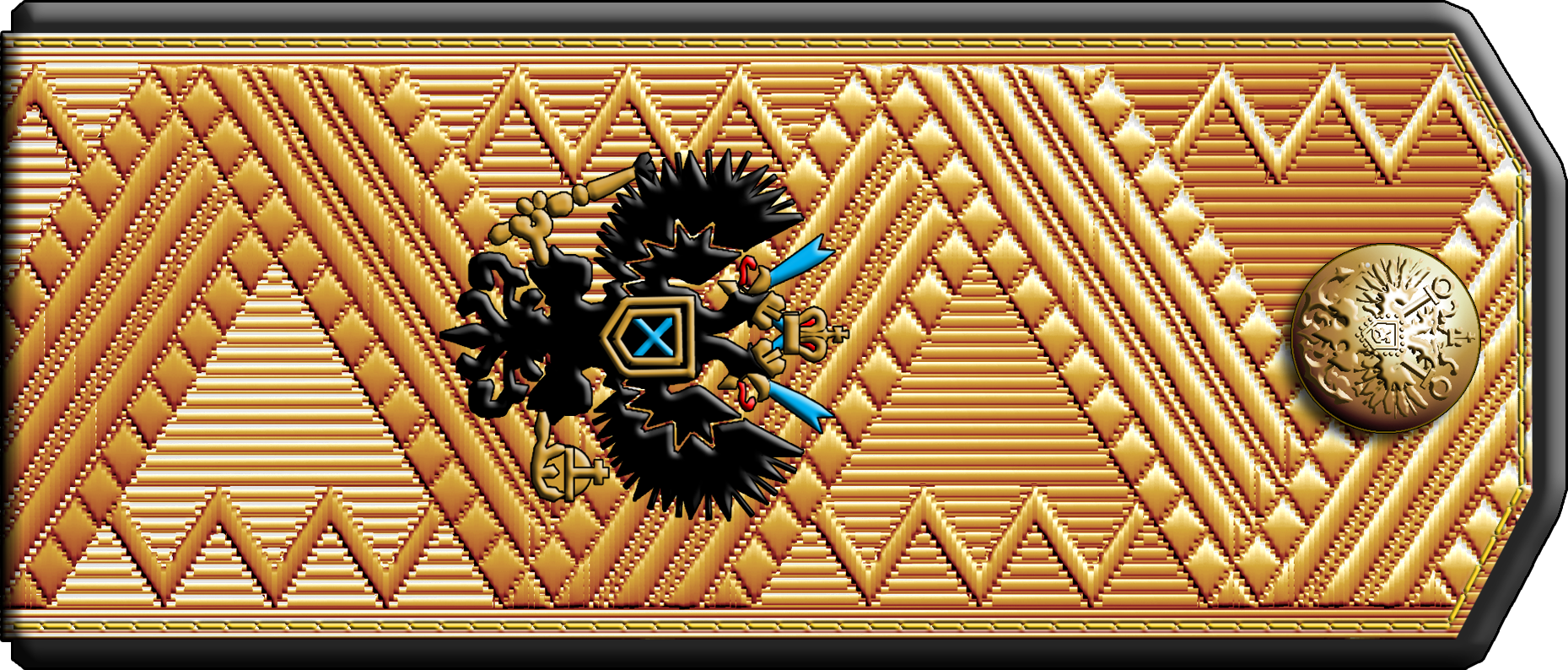
- Kontr-admiral (Commodore) - 1916
- Generał podporucznik marynarki (Brigadier general of the navy) - 1918
- Generał porucznik marynarki (Major general of the navy) - 30 April 1921
- Wiceadmirał (Rear admiral) - 3 May 1922

== Awards and decorations ==
- Polish:
  - Commander's Cross of the Order of Polonia Restituta (2 May 1923)
  - Officer's Cross of the Order of Polonia Restituta
  - Cross of Valour
- Russian:
  - Order of St. George, 4th Class (29 October 1904)
  - Order of Saint Vladimir, 3rd and 4th Class
  - Order of Saint Anna, 2nd and 3rd Class
  - Order of Saint Stanislaus, 2nd and 3rd Class (11 November 1904)
  - Golden Weapon for Bravery (2 April 1907)
- From other countries:
  - Order of the Red Eagle, 4th Class (Kingdom of Prussia)
  - Grand Cross of the Order of the Star of Romania (Romania)
  - Grand Officer of the Order of Glory (Tunisia)
  - Commander of the Order of the Crown of Italy (Italy, 1909)
  - Commander of the Order of Saints Maurice and Lazarus (Italy, 1909)
  - Officer of the Legion of Honour (France)
  - Cross of Liberty, 2nd Class (Estonia)
