= Ottoman Navy =

Navy of the Ottoman Empire

- Turkish: Osmanlı Donanması
- Naval standard of the Ottoman Sultan
- Active: 1323–1922
- Country: Ottoman Empire
- Allegiance: Ottoman Sultan
- Type: Navy
- Garrison/HQ: Ministry of the Navy, Constantinople
- Engagements: Ottoman wars in Europe; Greek War of Independence; Crimean War; Tripolitanian War; Balkan Wars; World War I

Commanders
- Kapudan Pasha (1567–1867): Müezzinzade Ali Pasha (first); Damat Mehmed Ali Pasha (last)
- Minister of the Navy (1867–1922): İsmail Hakkı Paşa (first); Salih Hulusi Pasha (last)
- Fleet Commander (1877–1922): Bozcaadalı Hasan Hüsnü Pasha (first); Fuat Hüsnü Kayacan (last)

The Ottoman Navy (Turkish: Osmanlı Donanması) or the Imperial Navy (Ottoman Turkish: Donanma-yı Humâyûn), also known as the Ottoman Fleet, was the naval warfare arm of the Ottoman Empire. It was established after the Ottomans first reached the sea in 1323 by capturing Praenetos (later called Karamürsel after the founder of the Ottoman Navy), the site of the first Ottoman naval shipyard and the nucleus of the future navy.

During its long existence, the Ottoman Navy was involved in many conflicts and signed a number of maritime treaties. It played a decisive role in the conquest of Constantinople and the subsequent expansion into the Mediterranean and Black Seas. At its height in the 16th century, the Navy extended to the Indian Ocean, sending an expedition to Indonesia in 1565, and by the early 17th century operated as far as the Atlantic. Commensurate with the decline and modernization of the empire in the late 18th century, the Ottoman Navy stagnated, albeit remaining among the largest in the world: with nearly 200 warships, including 21 battleships, it ranked third after the British and French navies in 1875.

For much of its history, the Navy was led by the Kapudan Pasha (Grand Admiral; literally "Captain Pasha"); this position was abolished in 1867, when it was replaced by the Minister of the Navy (Turkish: Bahriye Nazırı) and a number of Fleet Commanders (Turkish: Donanma Komutanları).

After the end of the Ottoman Empire and the declaration of the Republic of Turkey in 1923, the Navy's tradition was continued under the modern Turkish Naval Forces.

== History ==
=== Pre-Ottoman Turkish fleets ===
The first Turkish naval fleet in Anatolia, which consisted of 33 sail ships and 17 oar ships, was formed at the port of Smyrna (İzmir) by Tzachas in 1081, following his conquest of Smyrna, Vourla (Urla), Kysos (Çeşme), Phocaea (Foça) and Teos (Sığacık) on the Aegean coast of Anatolia in that same year. Tzachas's fleet raided Lesbos in 1089 and Chios in 1090, before defeating a Byzantine fleet near the Oinousses Islands off Chios on 19 May 1090, which marked the first major naval victory of the Anatolian Turks in a naval battle. In 1091 Tzachas's fleet raided the islands of Samos and Rhodes in the Aegean Sea, but was then defeated and driven out by the Byzantine admirals Constantine Dalassenos and John Doukas. In 1095 Tzachas's fleet raided the strategic port city and Gulf of Adramyttium (Edremit) on the Aegean coast of Anatolia and the city of Abydos on the Dardanelles Strait.

Seljuq sultan of Rûm Kayqubad I conquered Alaiye (Alanya) and formed a naval arsenal there. Alanya became the homeport of the Seljuk fleet in the Mediterranean Sea. Kayqubad I later formed a fleet in the Black Sea based in Sinope (Sinop), which, under the command of Amir Chupan, conquered parts of the Crimean Peninsula and Sugdak on the Sea of Azov (1220–1237).

=== Rise (1299–1453) ===
==== Expansion to the Aegean, Black, Ionian and Adriatic Seas ====
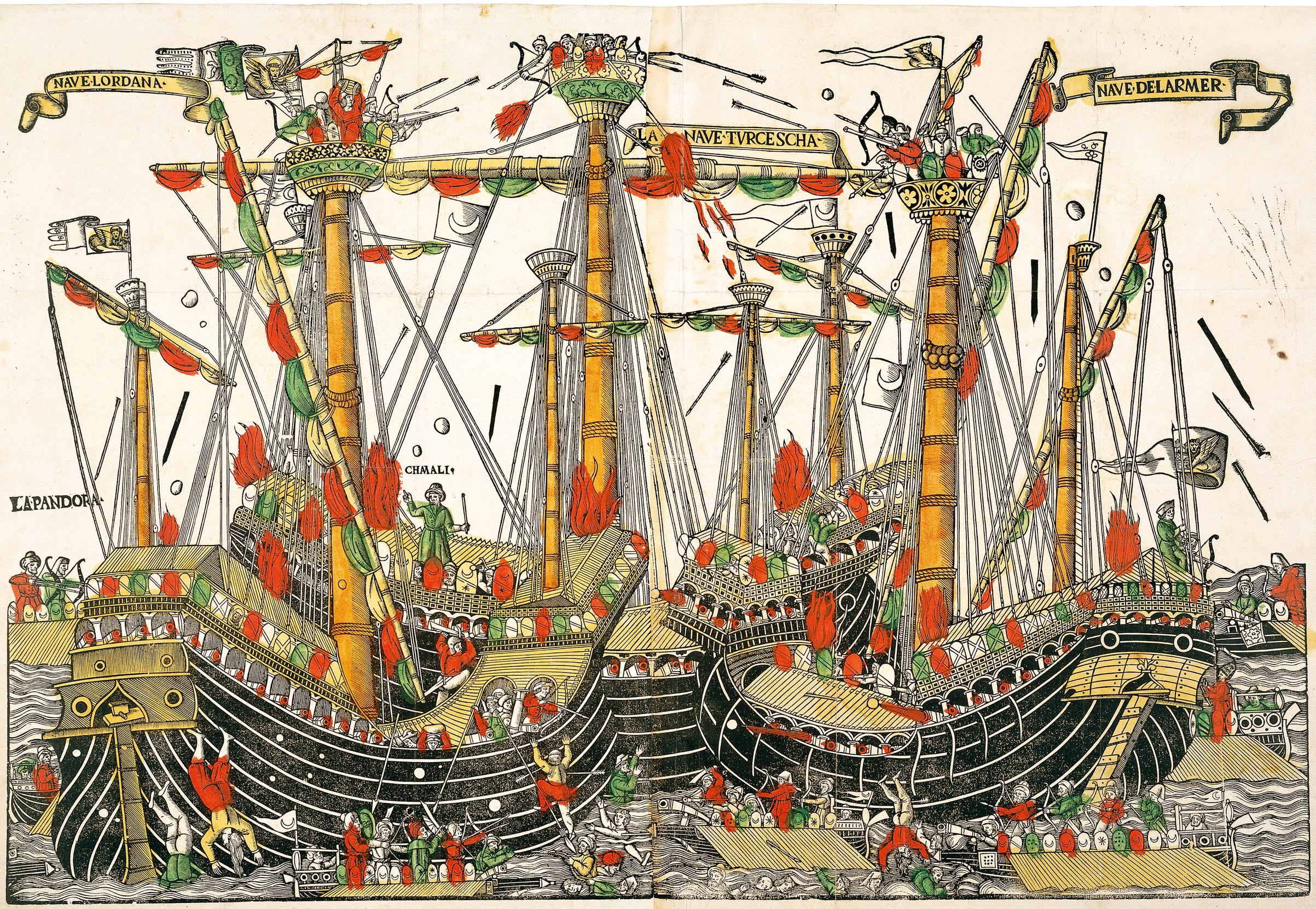
The Battle of Zonchio in 1499.

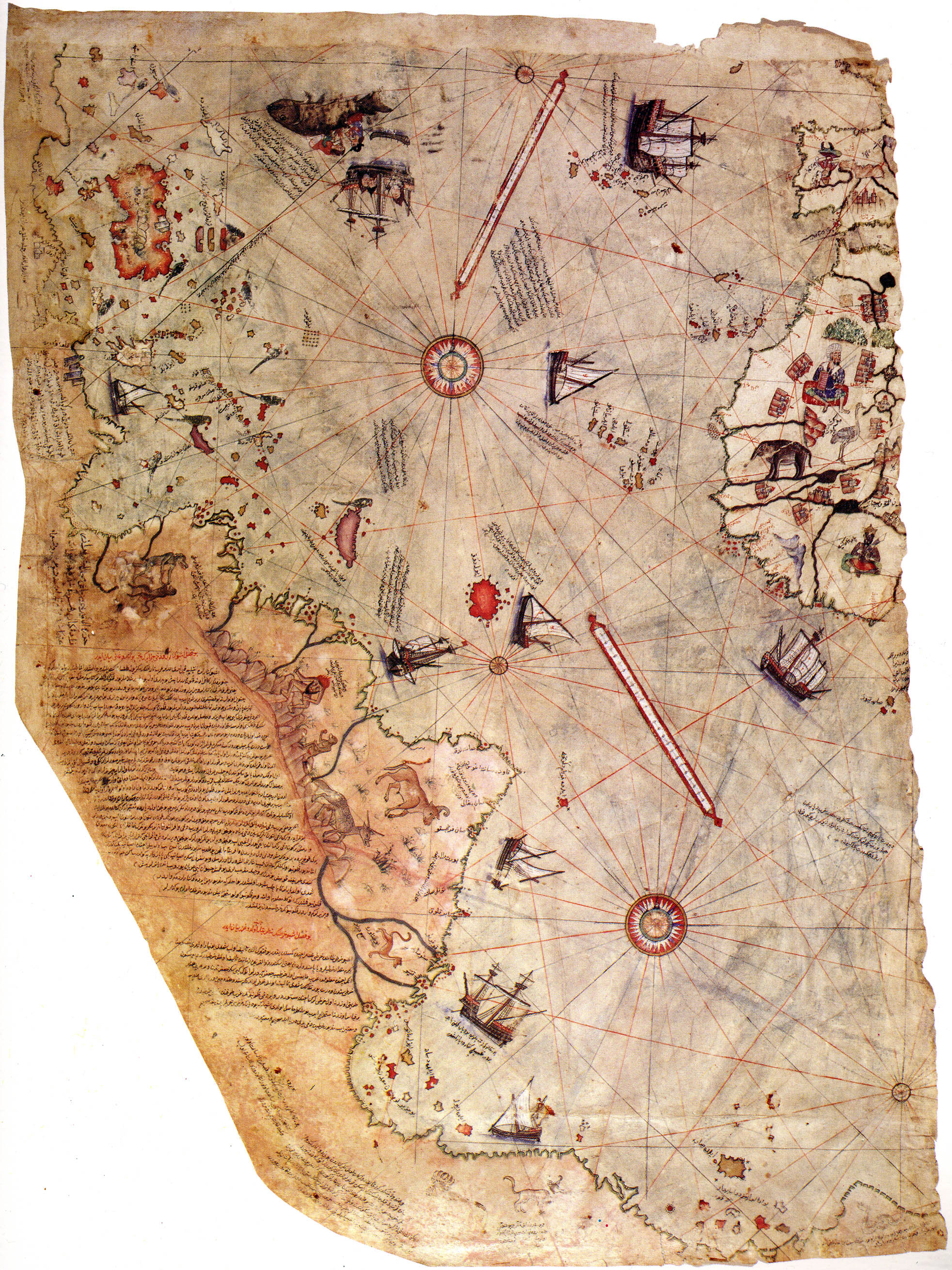
Surviving fragment of the first world map of Ottoman admiral Piri Reis (1513) showing the Atlantic Ocean and the Americas.

The conquest of the island of Kalolimno (İmralı Island) in the Sea of Marmara in 1308 marked the first Ottoman naval victory. The Ottoman fleet made its first landings on Thrace in 1321. The first Ottoman fortress in Europe was built in 1351, and the Anatolian shores of the strategic Bosporus Strait near Constantinople in 1352, and both shores of the equally strategic Dardanelles Strait were conquered by the Ottoman fleet.

In 1373 the first landings and conquests on the Aegean shores of Macedonia were made, which was followed by the first Ottoman siege of Thessaloniki in 1374. The first Ottoman conquest of Thessaloniki and Macedonia were completed in 1387. Between 1387 and 1423 the Ottoman fleet contributed to the territorial expansions of the Ottoman Empire on the Balkan peninsula and the Black Sea coasts of Anatolia. Following the first conquests of Venetian territories in Morea, the first Ottoman-Venetian War (1423–1430) started.

In the meantime, the Ottoman fleet continued to contribute to the expansion of the Ottoman Empire in the Aegean and Black Seas, with the conquests of Sinop (1424), Smyrna (1426) and the reconquest of Thessaloniki from the Venetians (1430). Albania was reconquered by the Ottoman fleet with landings between 1448 and 1479.

=== Growth (1453–1683) ===
In 1453 the Ottoman fleet participated in the historic conquests of Constantinople, Gökçeada, Lemnos and Thasos. The conquest of the Duchy of Athens and the Despotate of the Morea was completed between 1458 and 1460, followed by the conquest of the Empire of Trebizond and the Genoese colony of Amasra in 1461, which brought an end to the final vestiges of the Byzantine Empire. In 1462 the Ottoman fleet conquered the Genoese islands of the northern Aegean Sea, which were administered by the Gattilusio family, including their capital Mytilene in the island of Lesbos. This was followed by the Ottoman-Venetian War of 1463–1479.

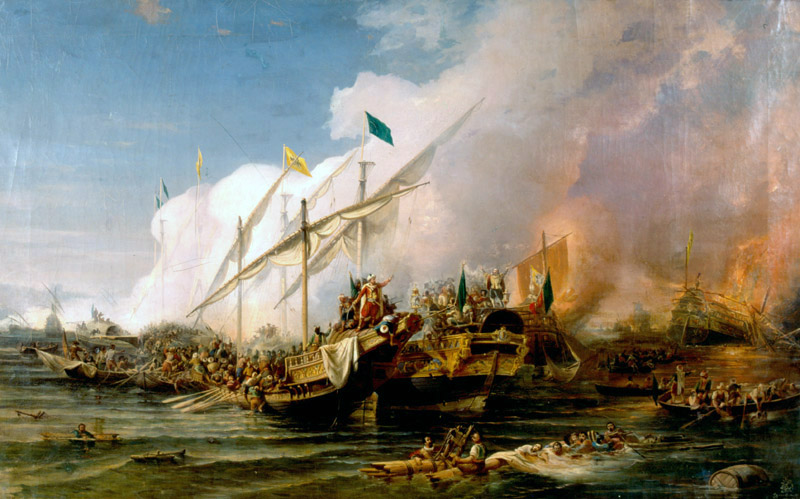
Ottoman admiral Hayreddin Barbarossa defeated the Holy League of Charles V under the command of Andrea Doria at the Battle of Preveza in 1538.

In the following period the Ottoman fleet gained more territory in the Aegean Sea, and in 1475 set foot on Crimea on the northern shores of the Black Sea. Until 1499 this was followed by further expansion on the Black Sea coasts (such as the conquest of Georgia in 1479) and on the Balkan peninsula (such as the final reconquest of Albania in 1497, and the conquest of Montenegro in 1499). The loss of Venetian forts in Montenegro, near the strategic Castelnuovo, triggered the Ottoman-Venetian War of 1499–1503, during which the Turkish fleet of Kemal Reis defeated the Venetian forces at the Battle of Zonchio (1499) and the Battle of Modon (1500). By 1503 the Ottoman fleet raided the northeastern Adriatic coasts of Italy, and completely captured the Venetian lands on Morea, the Ionian Sea coast and the southeastern Adriatic Sea coast.

According to Kâtip Çelebi a typical Ottoman fleet in the mid-17th century consisted of 46 vessels (40 galleys and 6 maona's) whose crew was 15,800 men, roughly two-thirds (10,500) were oarsmen, and the remainder (5,300) fighters.

==== Expansion to the Levant and Maghreb, operations in the West Mediterranean ====
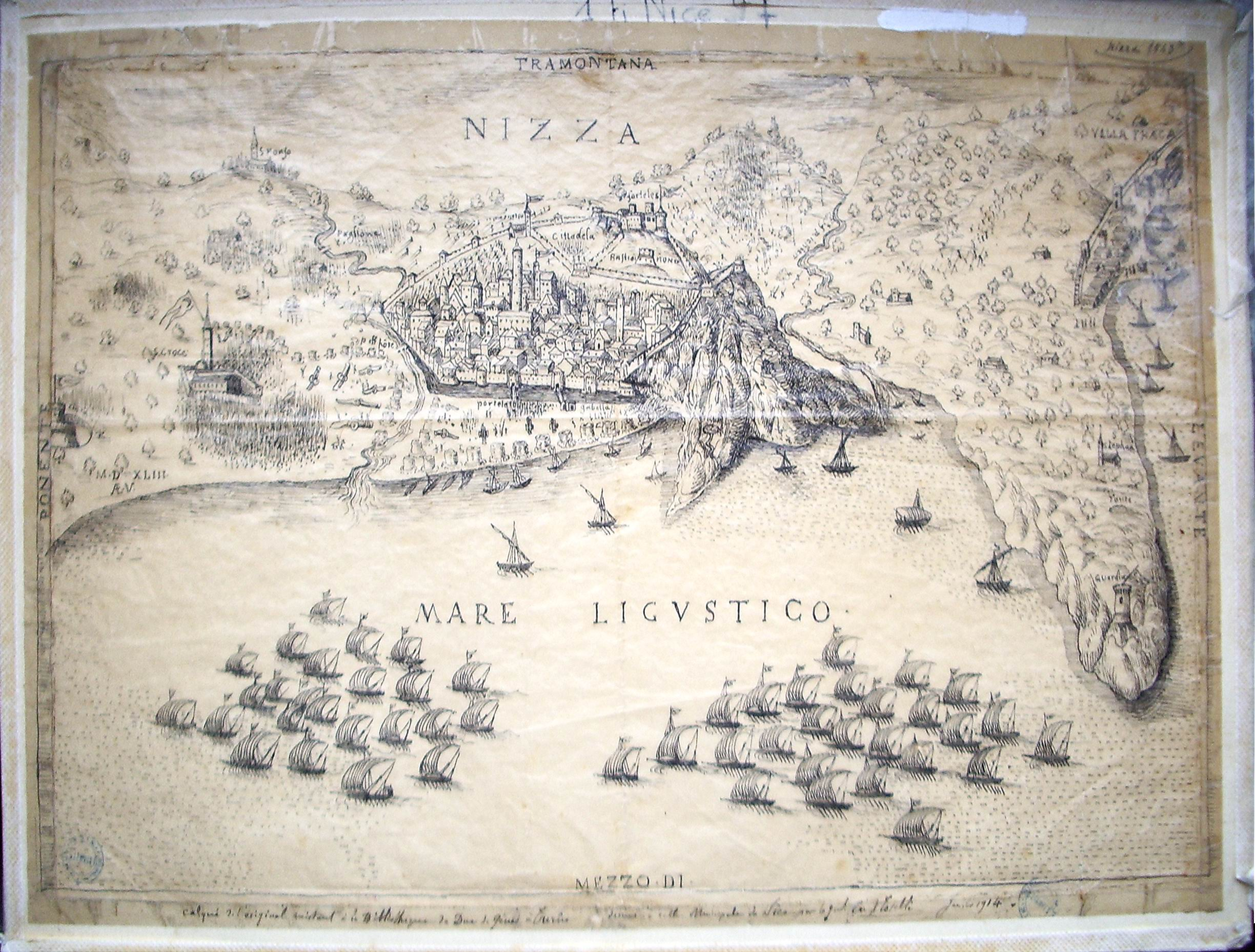
During the Siege of Nice in 1543, the combined forces of the Franco-Ottoman alliance managed to capture the city.

Ottoman fleet wintering at the French port of Toulon in 1543. Miniature by Matrakçı Nasuh, who was travelling with the fleet.

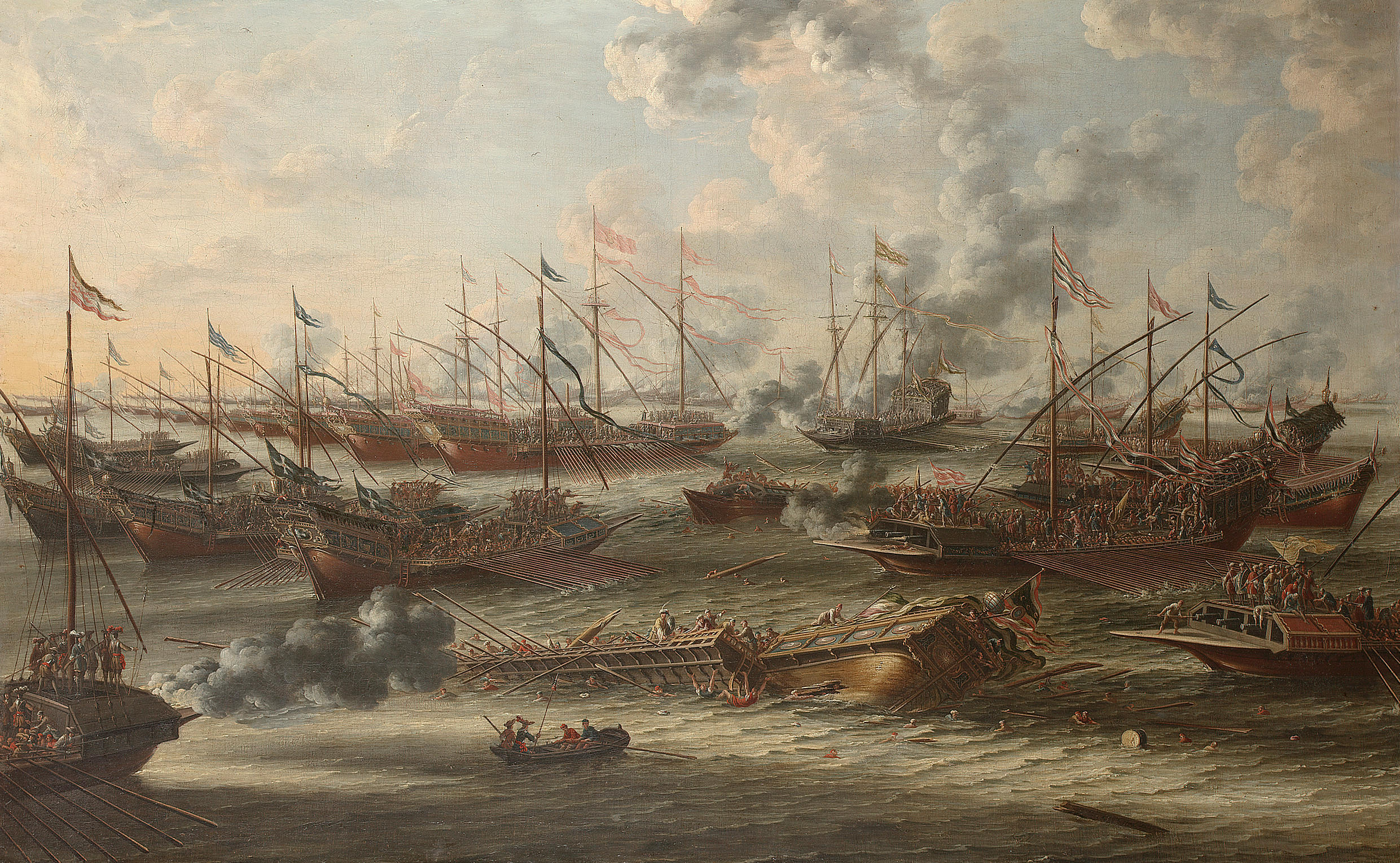
The Battle of Lepanto in 1571, by Laureys a Castro (c. 1683)

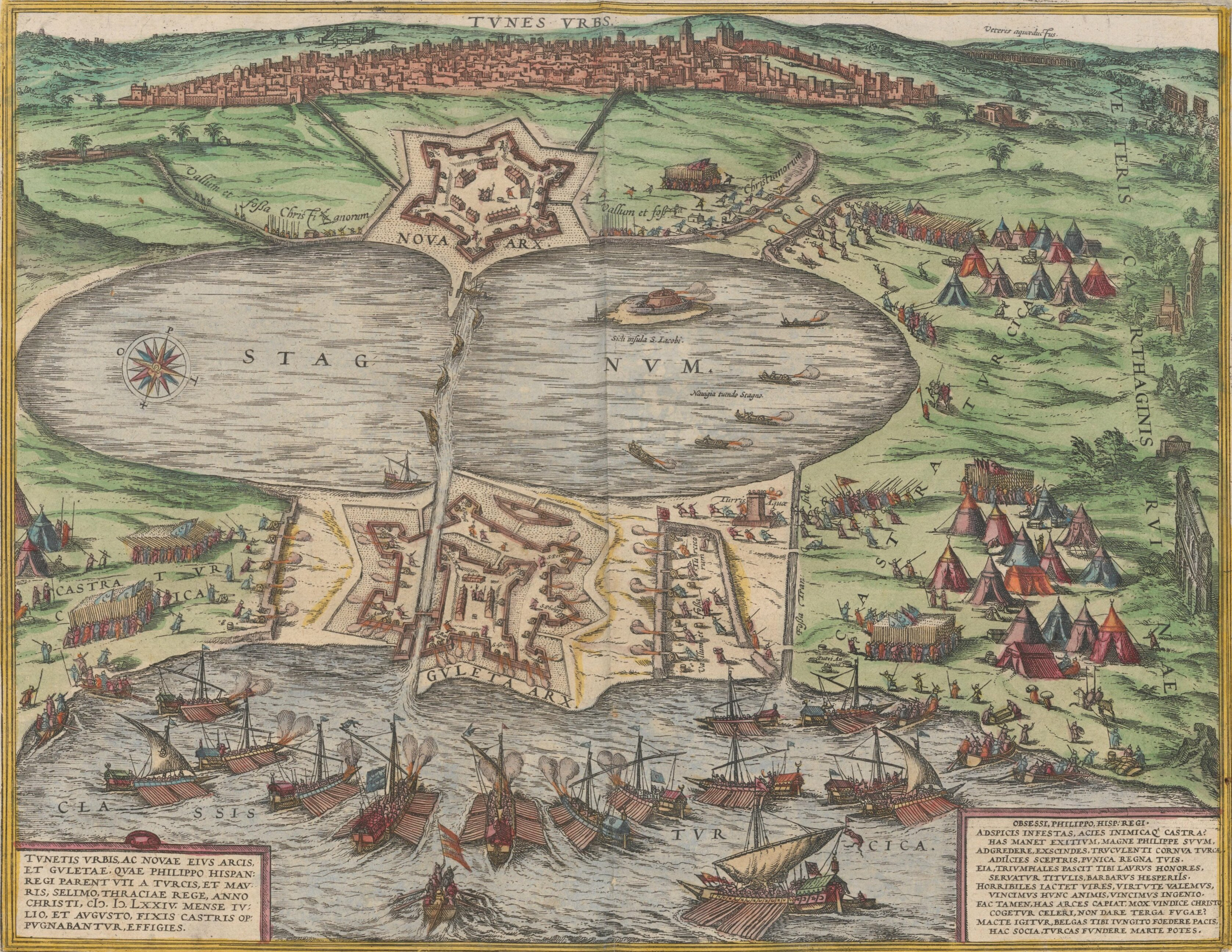
The Ottoman fleet at La Goulette during the capture of Tunis in 1574

Starting from the conquest of Syria in 1516, the Ottoman fleet of Selim I started expanding the Ottoman territories towards the Levant and the Mediterranean coasts of North Africa. Between 1516 and 1517 Algeria was conquered from Spain by the forces of Oruç Reis, who declared his allegiance to the Ottoman Empire, which was followed by the conquest of Egypt and the end of the Mameluke Empire in 1517. In 1522 the strategic island of Rhodes, then the seat of the Knights of St. John, was conquered by the naval fleet of Kurtoğlu Muslihiddin Reis; Suleiman I let the Knights leave the island, and they relocated their base first to Sicily and later to Malta.

In 1527 the Ottoman fleet participated in the conquest of Dalmatia, Croatia, Slavonia, and Bosnia. In 1529 the Ottoman fleet under Salih Reis and Aydın Reis destroyed the Spanish fleet of Rodrigo Portundo near the Isle of Formentera. This was followed by the first conquest of Tunisia from Spain and the reconquest of Morea by the forces of Hayreddin Barbarossa, whose fleet later conquered the islands belonging to the Duchy of Naxos in 1537. Afterwards, the Ottoman fleet laid siege on the Venetian island of Corfu, and landed on the coasts of Calabria and Apulia, which forced the Republic of Venice and Habsburg Spain ruled by Charles V to ask the Pope to create a Holy League consisting of Spain, the Republic of Venice, the Republic of Genoa, the Papal States and the Knights of Malta. The joint fleet was commanded by Charles V's leading admiral, Andrea Doria. The Holy League and the Ottoman fleet under the command of Hayreddin Barbarossa met in September 1538 at the Battle of Preveza, which is often considered the greatest Turkish naval victory in history. In 1543 the Ottoman fleet participated with French forces in the siege of Nice, which at the time was part of the Duchy of Savoy. Afterwards, Francis I of France enabled the Ottoman fleet to overwinter in the French harbor of Toulon. This unique Ottoman wintering in Toulon (sometimes inaccurately called an occupation; the Ottomans merely stayed the winter and did not impose any form of governance on the populace) allowed the Ottomans to attack Habsburg Spanish and Italian ports (enemies of France); they left Toulon in May 1544. Matrakçı Nasuh, a 16th-century Ottoman Janissary, polymath, and swordmaster, reportedly participated in the wintering in Toulon.

In 1541, 1544, 1552 and 1555, the Spanish-Italian fleet of Charles V under the command of Andrea Doria was defeated in Algiers, Naples, Ponza, and Piombino, respectively.

==== Operations in the Indian Ocean and the final conquests in North Africa ====
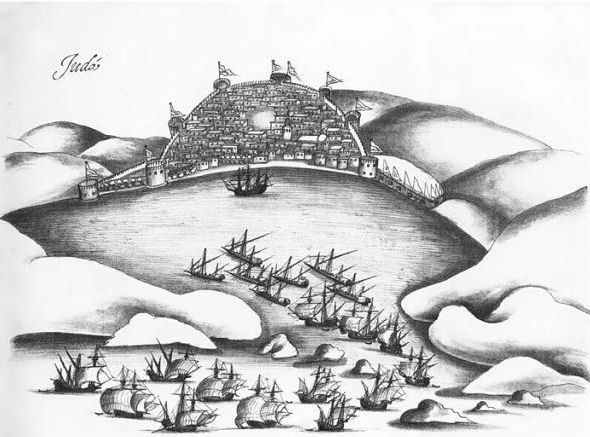
Selman Reis defending Jeddah against a Portuguese attack in 1517

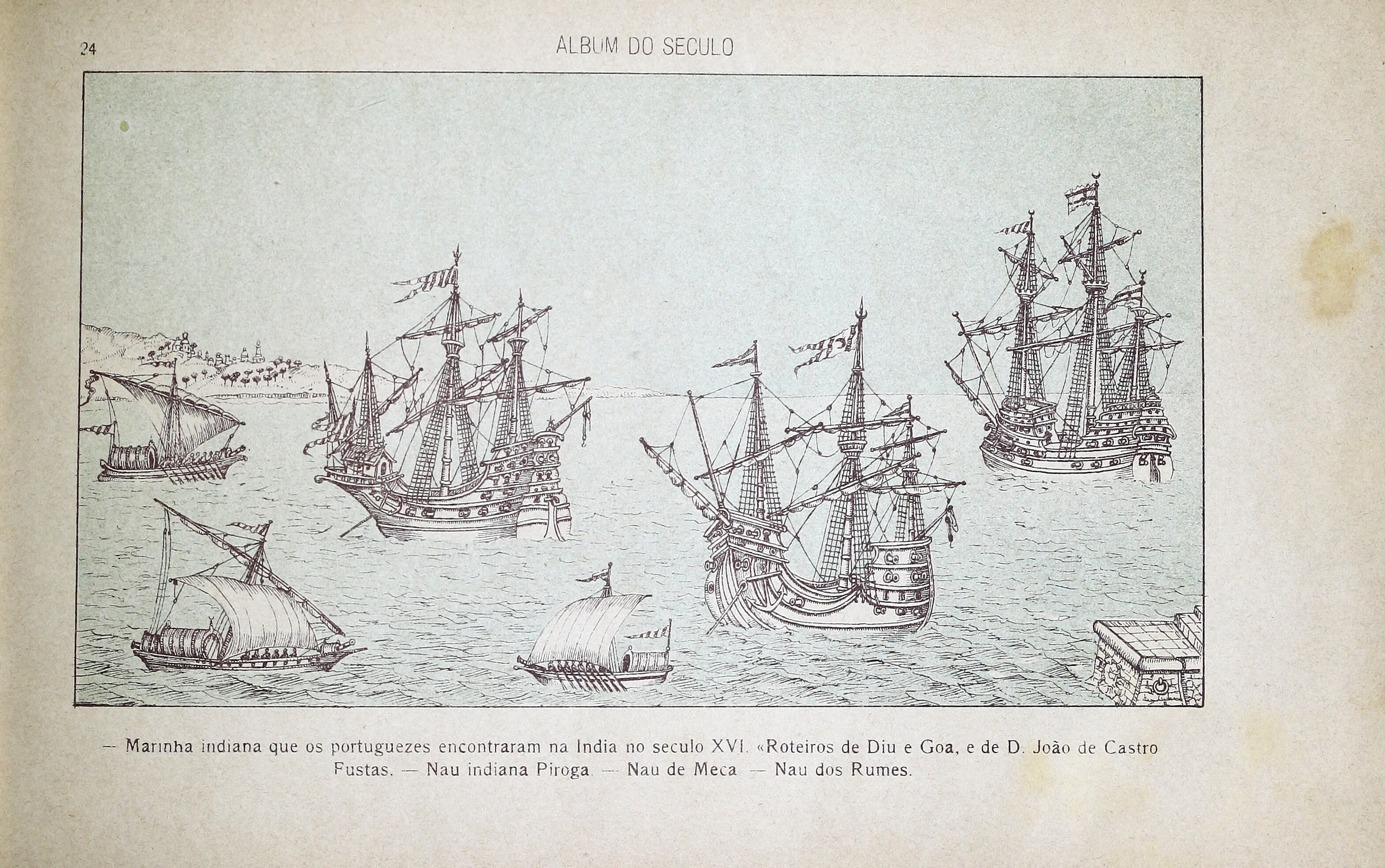
Portuguese depiction of ships at the Indian Ocean, including an Ottoman carrack on the right.

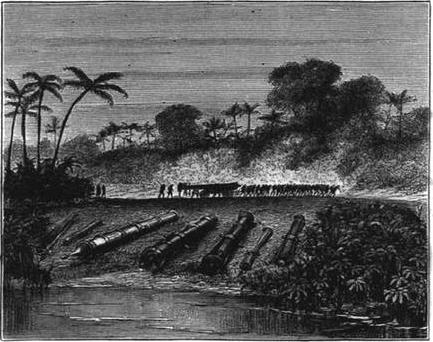
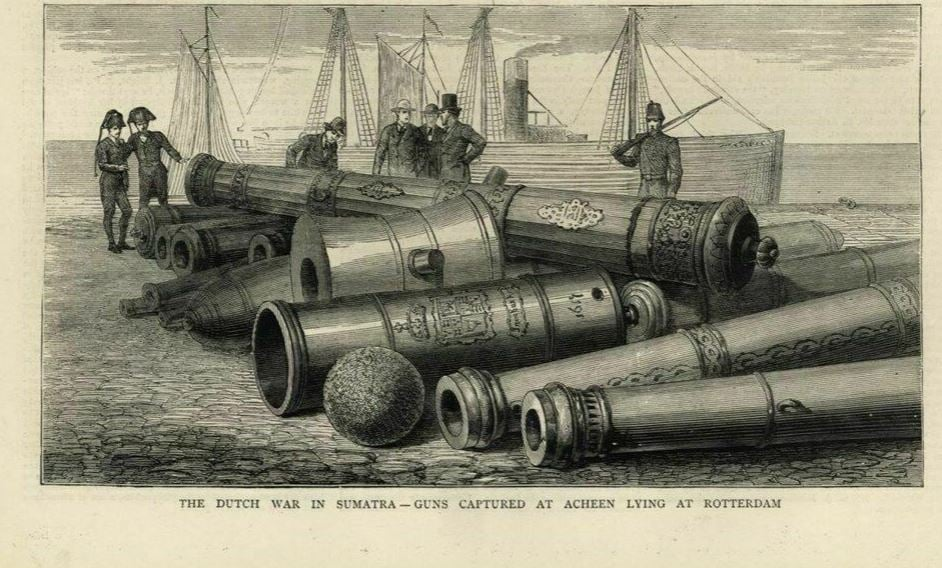
Captured Ottoman and Acehnese guns following the Dutch conquest of Aceh in 1874.

In the meantime, the Ottoman Indian Ocean Fleet, based in Suez and Basra, defeated the Portuguese forces on several occasions near the Arabian peninsula, conquering Aden and Yemen (1538–1539) which were important Portuguese ports, along with Jeddah, Djibouti on the Red Sea coast. The Ottoman siege of Diu in 1538, which aimed to remove the Portuguese from India, failed to achieve this goal.

Between 1547 and 1548, Yemen was reconquered from the Portuguese, while in the Persian Gulf and Arabian Sea, other important Portuguese ports such as Oman and Qatar were conquered in 1552, but the Ottomans failed to take Hormuz Island and therefore the control of the Persian Gulf remained firmly in Portuguese hands.

In 1565 the Sultanate of Aceh in Sumatra (Indonesia) declared allegiance to the Ottoman Empire, and in 1569 the Ottoman fleet of Kurtoğlu Hızır Reis sailed to new ports such as Debal, Surat, Janjira and finally set foot on Aceh with a well-equipped fleet of 22 ships, which marked the easternmost Ottoman territorial expansion.

The Ottoman naval victory at the Battle of Preveza in 1538 and the Battle of Djerba in 1560 ensured the Ottoman supremacy in the Mediterranean Sea for several decades, until the Ottomans suffered their first ever military defeat at the hands of the Europeans at the Battle of Lepanto (1571). But the defeat at Lepanto, despite being much celebrated in Europe, was only a temporary setback: it could not reverse the Ottoman conquest of Cyprus, and within a year, the Ottomans built an equally large fleet, which in 1574 conquered Tunisia from Spain. This completed the Ottoman conquest of North Africa, following the operations of the Ottoman fleet under Turgut Reis which had earlier conquered Libya (1551); and of the fleet under Salih Reis which had conquered the coasts of Morocco beyond the Strait of Gibraltar in 1553.

==== Operations in the Atlantic Ocean ====
Starting from the early 17th century, the Ottoman fleet began to venture into the Atlantic Ocean (earlier, Kemal Reis had sailed to the Canary Islands in 1501, while the fleet of Murat Reis the Elder had captured Lanzarote of the Canary Islands in 1585). In 1617 the Ottoman fleet captured Madeira in the Atlantic Ocean, before raiding Sussex, Plymouth, Devon, Hartland Point, Cornwall and the other counties of western England in August 1625. In 1627 Ottoman naval ships, accompanied by Barbary corsairs under the leadership of Murat Reis the Younger, captured the Isle of Lundy in the Bristol Channel, which served as the main base for Ottoman naval and privateering operations in the North Atlantic for the next five years. They raided the Shetland Islands, Faroe Islands, Denmark-Norway, Iceland and Vestmannaeyjar. Between 1627 and 1631 the same Ottoman force also raided the coasts of Ireland and Sweden. Ottoman ships later appeared off the eastern coasts of North America, particularly being sighted at the English colonies like Newfoundland and Virginia.

==== Black Sea operations ====
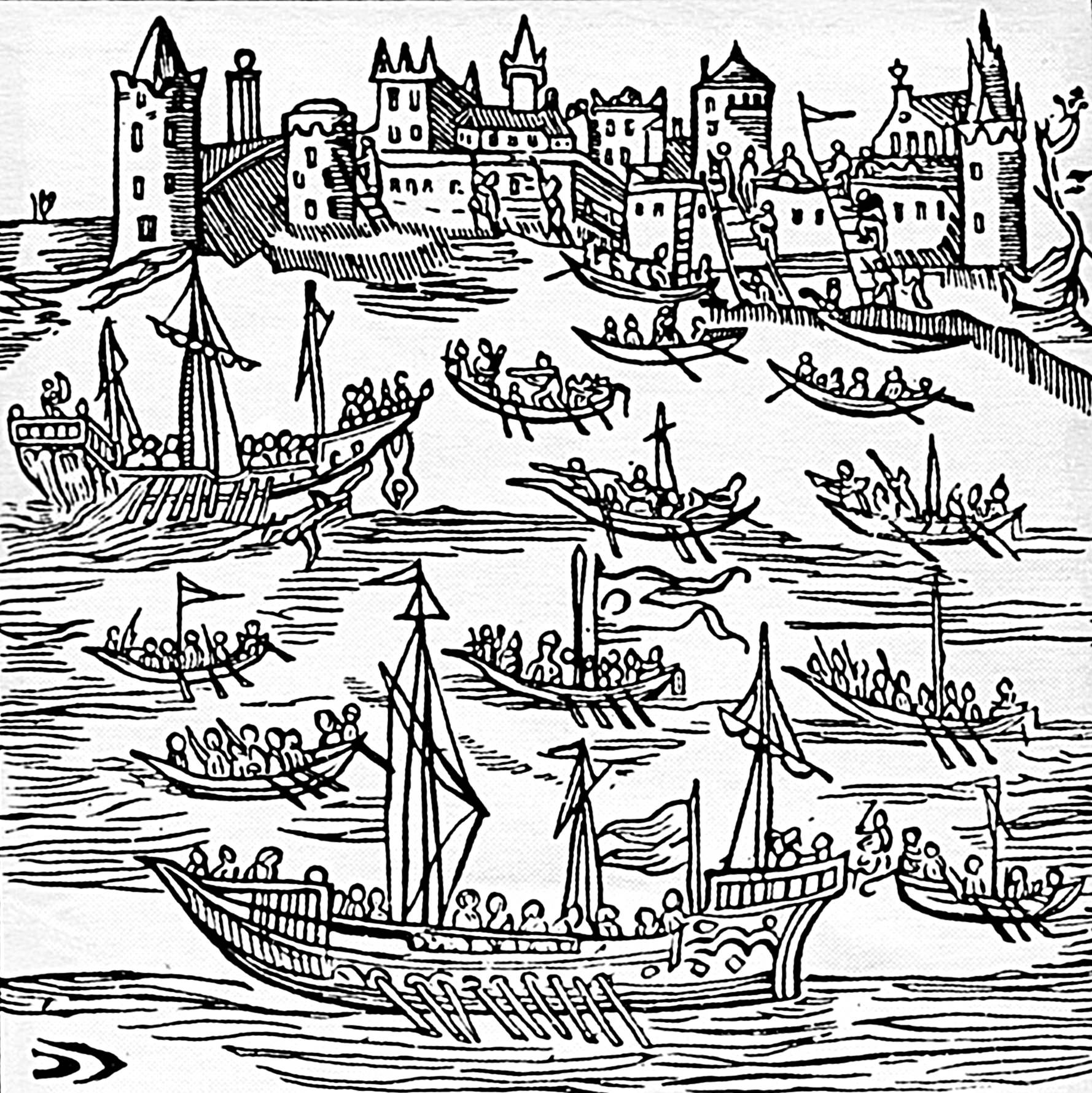
Zaporozhian Cossacks in chaika boats, destroying Ottoman galleys and capturing Caffa in 1616.

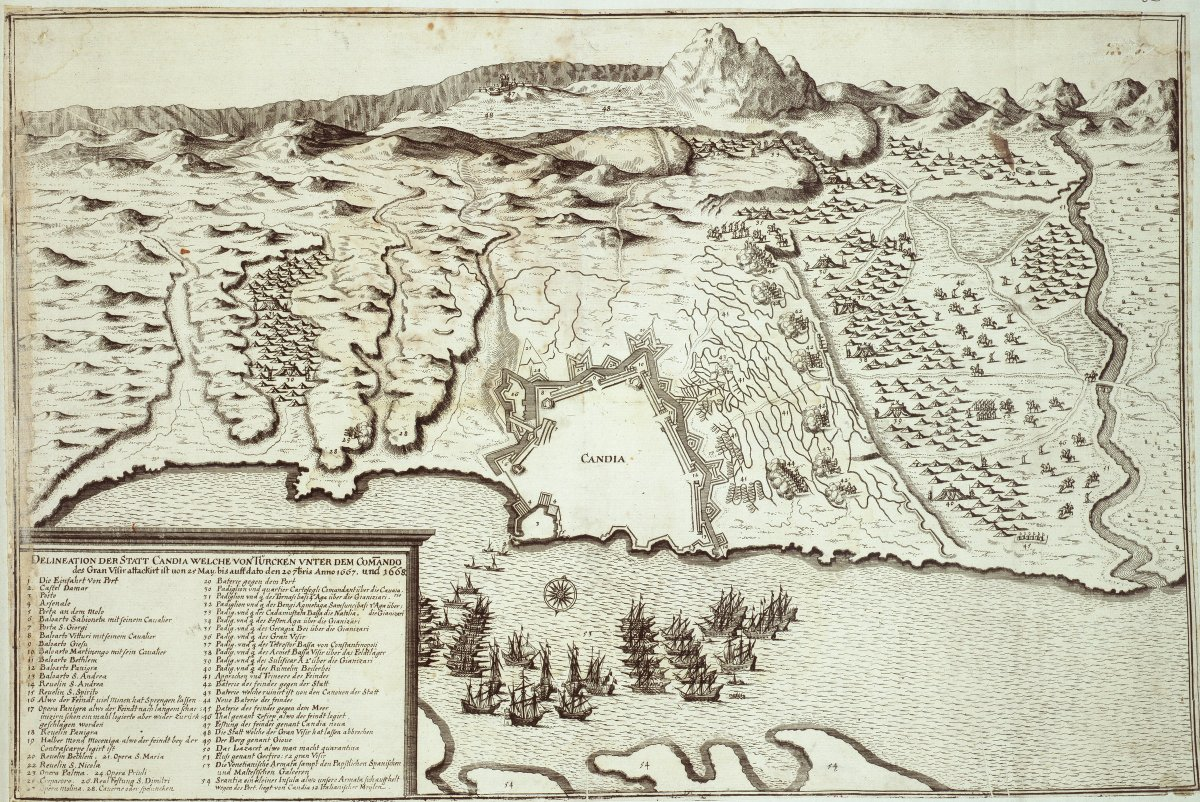
German map of the final phase of the siege of Candia during the Ottoman-Venetian War of 1645–1669. It clearly illustrates the city's trace italienne fortifications, and the proximity of the characteristic Ottoman siege trenches.

Before the Ottomans, the Seljuq sultan of Rûm, Alaeddin Keykubad I, had formed a Black Sea fleet based in Sinop, which, under the command of Amir Chupan, had conquered parts of the Crimean peninsula and Sugdak on the Sea of Azov between 1220 and 1237.

In the years following their conquest of Constantinople in 1453, the Ottoman Turks had dominated the Mediterranean with their fleets of galleys. In 1475, the Ottoman sultan Mehmed II employed 380 galleys under the command of Gedik Ahmet Pasha, whose fleet conquered the Greek Principality of Theodoro together with the Genoese-administered Crimean port towns of Cembalo, Soldaia, and Caffa ("Kefe" in Turkic languages.) As a result of these conquests, starting from 1478, the Crimean Khanate became a vassal state and protectorate of the Ottoman Empire, which lasted until 1774.

The failure of the siege of Malta in 1565 and the victory of the Holy League navies over the Ottomans at the Battle of Lepanto in 1571 indicated that the pendulum was beginning to swing the other way, further shown in the Battle of Cape Gelidonya, but the Black Sea was, for a time, regarded as a "Turkish Lake". For over a hundred years Ottoman naval supremacy in the Black Sea rested on three pillars: the Ottoman Turks controlled the Turkish Straits and the mouth of the Danube; none of the states in the region could muster an effective naval force; and the virtual absence of piracy on the Black Sea. However, after the 1550s, it was the start of frequent naval raids by Zaporozhian Cossacks that marked a major change in control of the Black Sea. The Cossacks' keelless rowing boats, called chaikas, could accommodate up to seventy men and outfitted with carronades, the boats made formidable sea vessels. They had the advantage over the Ottoman galleys in that being small, and low in the water, they were difficult to spot and highly manoeuvrable. In the early 1600s the Cossacks were able to assemble fleets of up to 300 such boats and send them to every corner of the Black Sea. They began attacking large towns such as Caffa, Varna, Trabzon, and even the suburbs of Constantinople.

Guillaume Levasseur de Beauplan, a French military engineer, provided a first-hand account of the Cossack operations and their tactics against the Turkish ships and towns on the Black Sea Coast. The high point of the Cossack attacks came in 1637, when a large party of Zaporozhian and Don Cossacks laid siege to the fortress of Azov. After a two-month land and sea battle, the fortress was conquered by the Cossacks.

The Ottoman Navy also engaged in blockades of Georgia's western coast during the sixteenth and seventeenth centuries in order to coerce local kingdoms into submission.

=== Stagnation (1683–1827) ===
In the rest of the 17th and 18th centuries, however, the operations of the Ottoman fleet were largely limited to the Mediterranean Sea, Black Sea, Red Sea, Persian Gulf and the Arabian Sea. The long-lasting Ottoman-Venetian War of 1645–1669 ended with Ottoman victory and the completion of the conquest of Crete, marking the empire's territorial zenith. In 1708 another long-lasting objective, the conquest of Oran (the final Spanish stronghold in Algeria) was accomplished.

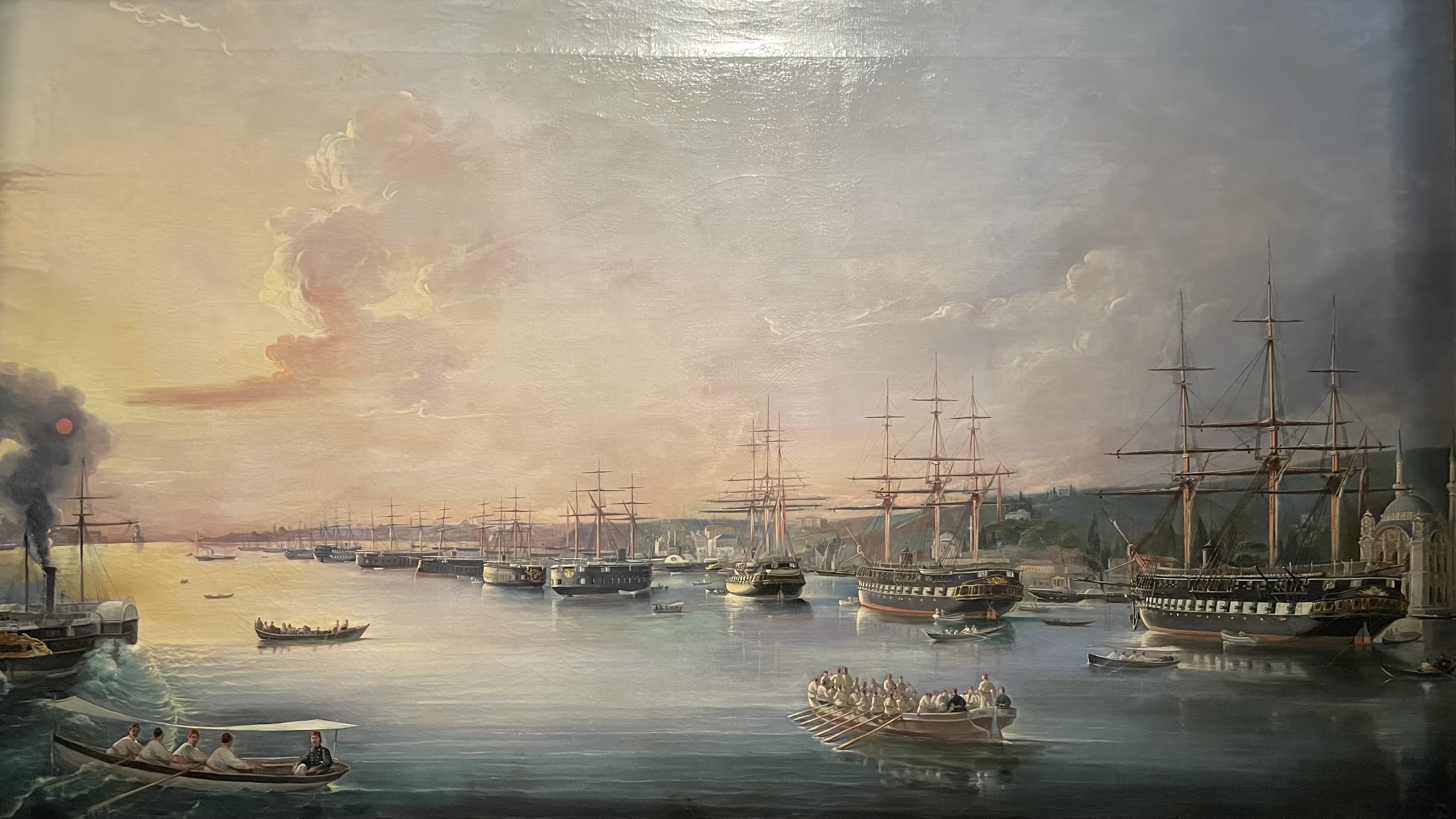
Ottoman Navy warships anchored off Ortaköy Mosque, Çırağan Palace and Dolmabahçe Palace in Istanbul.

The Ottoman fleet experienced a stalemate in the 18th century, with numerous victories matched by equally numerous defeats. Important Ottoman naval victories in this period included the reconquest of Moldavia and Azov from the Russians in 1711. The Ottoman–Venetian War of 1714–1718 saw the reconquest of Morea from the Venetians and the elimination of the last Venetian island strongholds in the Aegean.

For most of the 18th century, during a period of time in the eastern Mediterranean known by some as the Pax Ottomana, the focus of the Ottoman Navy was both on defining and defending its territorial waters from rival states and enforcing its authority over them as well as increasingly on protecting international trade routes and defending its maritime commerce from the constant problem of piracy.

However, during the Russo-Turkish War of 1768–1774, the Ottoman fleet was destroyed in the Battle of Chesme (1770). The next Russo-Turkish War (1787–1792) again saw numerous naval defeats at the hands of the Russian Black Sea Fleet under Admiral Fyodor Ushakov.

During the Greek War of Independence (1821–1829), the Greek rebel navy consisting of converted merchant ships originally challenged Ottoman naval supremacy in the Aegean, blockading Ottoman forts in the Morea and contributing to their capture by Greek land forces. Following the intervention of the Ottoman eyalet of Egypt in 1824, the far superior Ottoman-Egyptian fleet under the command of Ibrahim Pasha gained the upper hand and successfully invaded Crete and the Morea until the arrival of the combined British-French-Russian fleets which destroyed most of the Ottoman-Egyptian naval force at the Battle of Navarino in 1827.

Size of crew in Ottoman ships in 1699 and 1738
Size of crew	ships in 1699	ships in 1738
1500	-	1
1300	-	1
1100	-	1
1000	-	1
800	-	6
750	-	5
650	-	4
600	1	-
500	-	1
450	-	7
400	2	3
350	3	1
300	8	1
250	3	1
200	3	-
Total	20	33
Note: Between 1699 and 1738 the Ottoman navy started to use more sailing ships who needed more crew on each ship instead of galleys with less men.

==== Danube fleet ====
The size of the Danube fleet of the Ottoman Navy at the time of the Great Turkish War in the late 17th century was 52 vessels (4 galliots, 28 frigates and 20 flat-bottomed river boats) manned by 4,070 crew.

=== Decline (1827–1908) ===
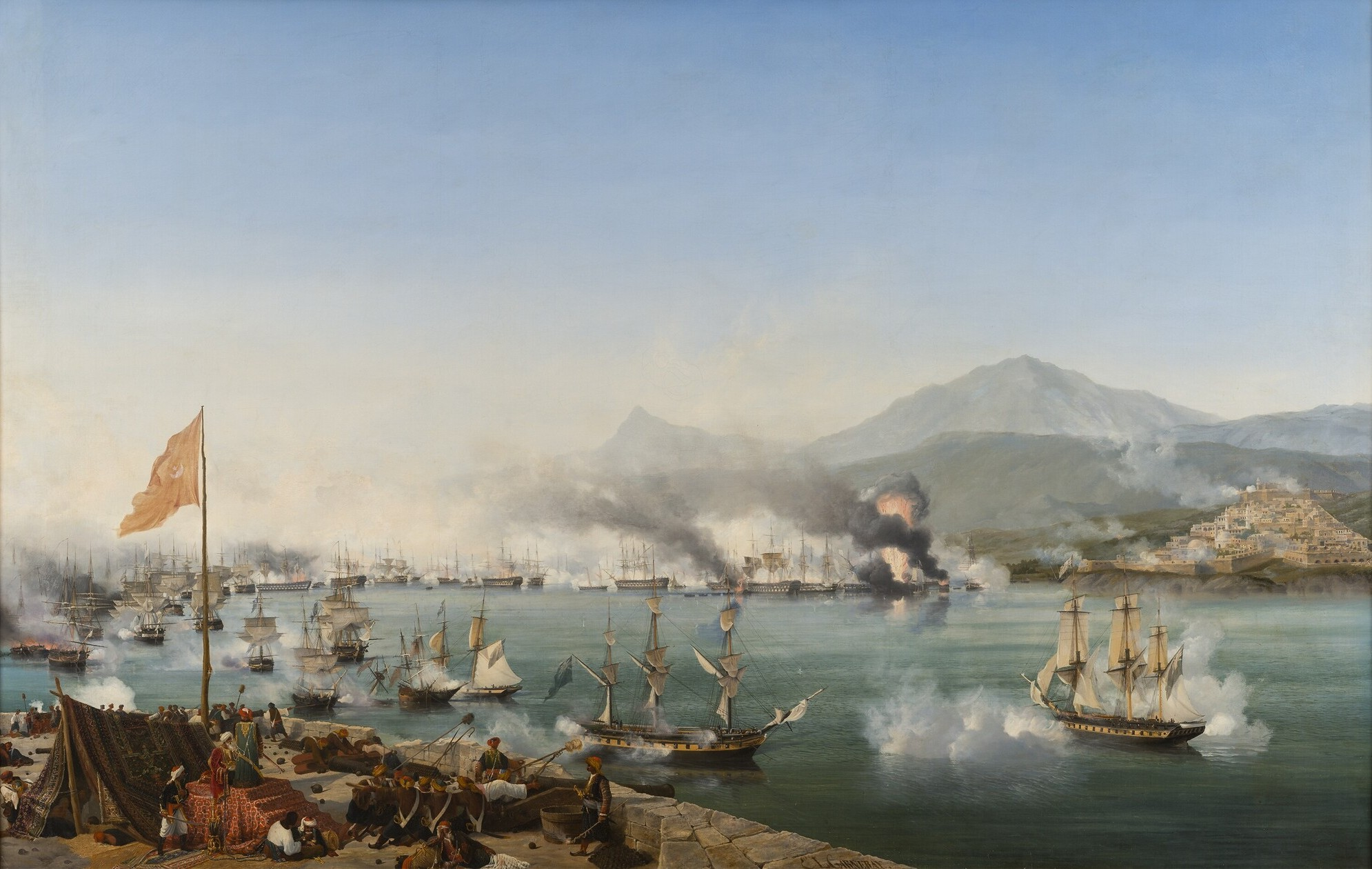
The Battle of Navarino in 1827

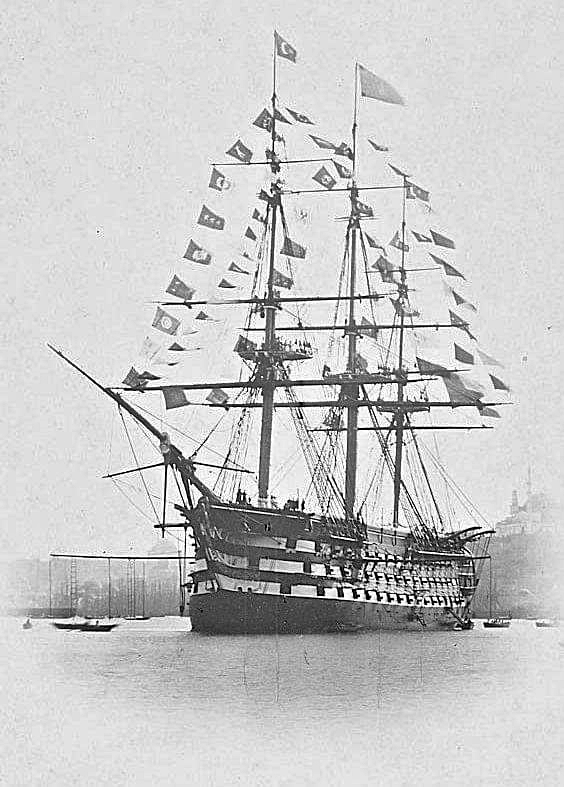
Mahmudiye (1829), built by the Imperial Naval Arsenal on the Golden Horn in Constantinople, was for many years the largest warship in the world. One of the world's few completed heavy first-rate battleships, she was a ship of the line with 128 guns on 3 decks. She participated in numerous naval battles, including the siege of Sevastopol (1854–1855) during the Crimean War.

Mecidiye-class paddle frigates were the first steam-powered warships to be built in the Ottoman Empire.

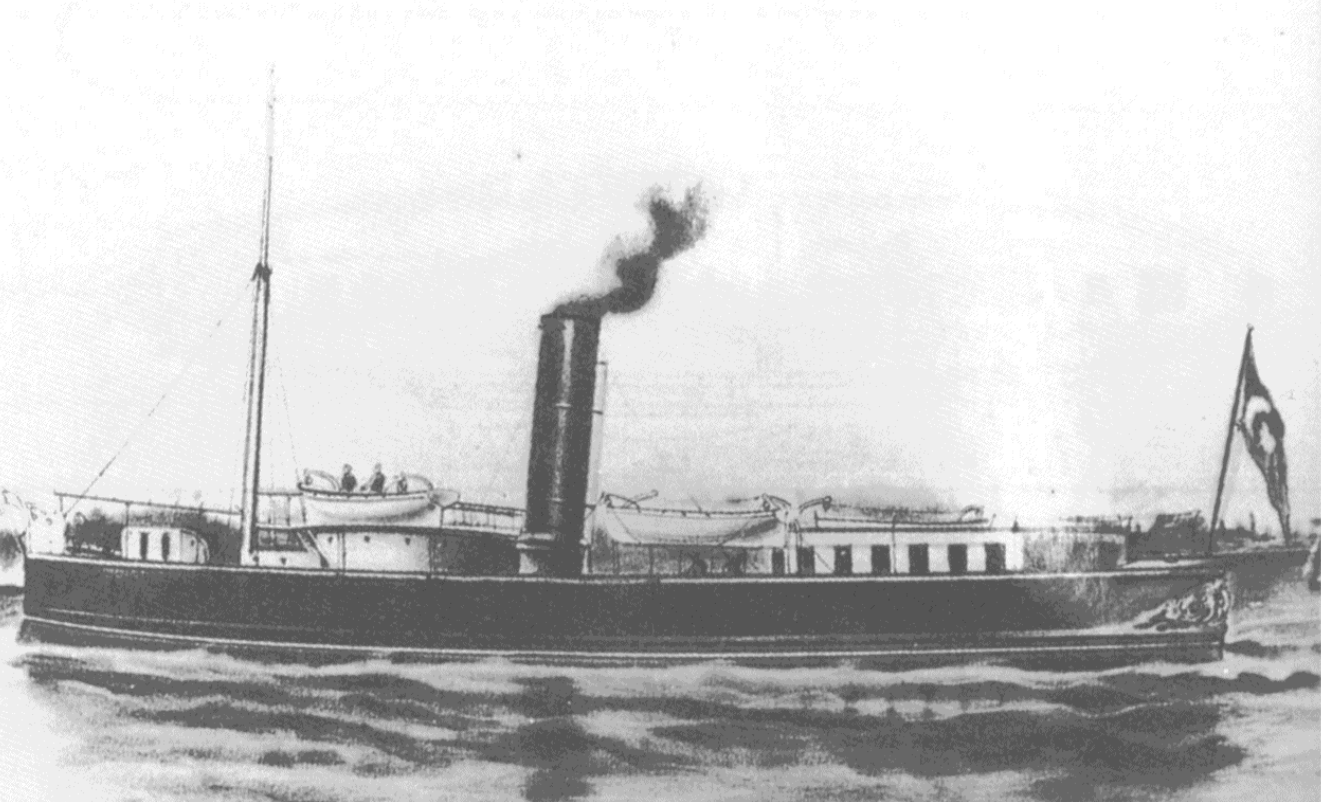
Ottoman monitor Hizber, 1875.

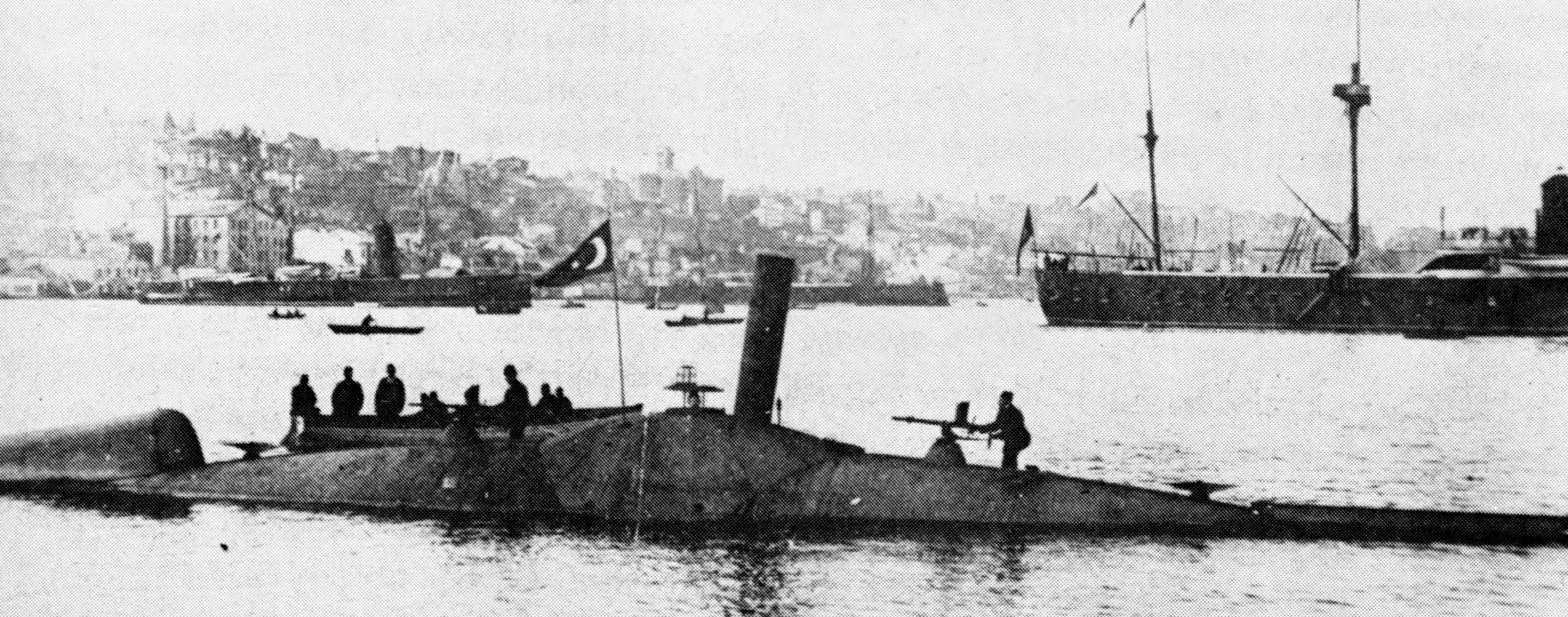
Nordenfelt-class Ottoman submarine Abdül Hamid (1886) was the first submarine in the world to fire a torpedo while submerged under water.

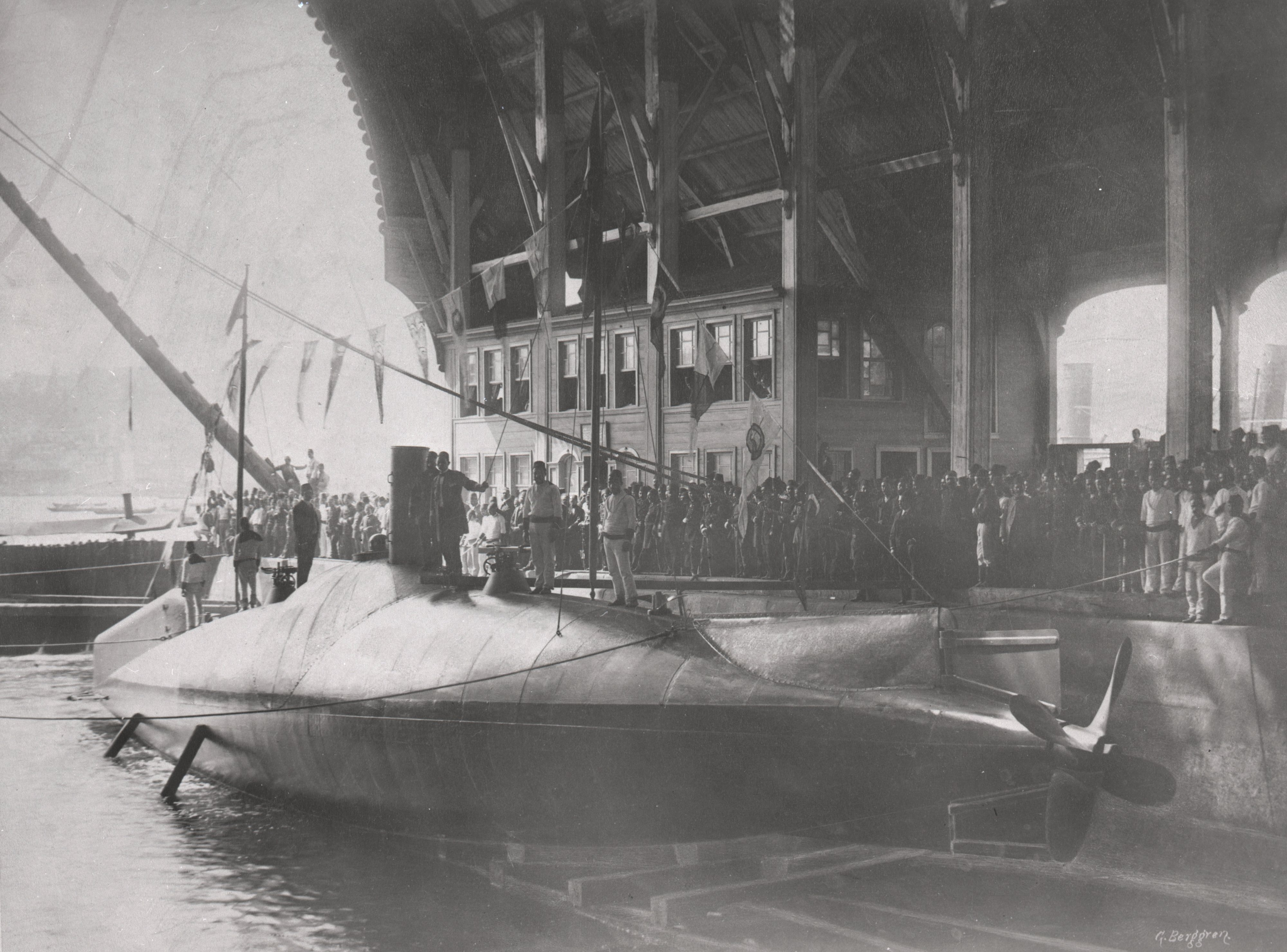
Ottoman submarine Abdül Hamid at the Taşkızak Naval Shipyard in Constantinople (Istanbul), 1886.

The 19th century saw further decline in Ottoman naval power, despite occasional recovery. Following the defeat against the combined British-French-Russian fleet at the Battle of Navarino in 1827, Sultan Mahmud II gave priority to develop a strong and modern Ottoman naval force. The first steam ships of the Ottoman Navy were acquired in 1828. In 1829 the world's largest warship for many years, the 201 x 56 kadem (1 kadem = 37.887 cm) or 76.15 m × 21.22 m (249.8 ft × 69.6 ft) ship of the line Mahmudiye, which had 128 cannons on 3 decks and carried 1,280 sailors on board, was built for the Ottoman Navy at the Imperial Arsenal on the Golden Horn in Constantinople. In the 1830s, about 2.500 Christian sailors (mainly Armenians and Greeks) were recruited in the Ottoman navy. This caused negative reactions from the Christian communities. Many Greeks from Rhodos and Chios fled to the neighboring smaller islands. In 1847, Christian sailors demanded their own priests and chapels on the warships, which was refused on the basis of Sharia. The Great Admiral and the Grand Vizier were in favour of the Christians' demands, but the Sheih ul-Islam declared that Christian services on board were equivalent to the construction of new churches, and thus forbidden by religious law.

In 1875, during the reign of Sultan Abdülaziz, the Ottoman Navy had 21 battleships and 173 other types of warships, ranking as the third largest navy in the world after the British and French navies. But the vast size of the navy was too much of a burden for the collapsing Ottoman economy to sustain. Abdülhamid II was aware that the empire needed a navy to shield herself from the ever-growing Russian threat. However, the Ottoman economic crisis of 1875 and the additional financial burden of the disastrous Russo-Turkish War (1877–1878) deprived the Ottoman Empire from the financial resources and economic independence to maintain and modernize a large fleet. The second half of the 19th century was a period of breakthroughs in the field of naval engineering. The Ottoman Navy was rapidly becoming obsolete, and needed to replace all her warships once a decade to keep up with the pace in technological progress – which, given the dismal state of the economy, was clearly not an option.

Nordenfelt-class Ottoman submarine Abdül Hamid (1886) was the first submarine in history to fire a torpedo while submerged under water. Two submarines of this class, Nordenfelt II (Abdül Hamid, 1886) and Nordenfelt III (Abdül Mecid, 1887) were built for the Ottoman Navy. They were built in pieces by Des Vignes (Chertsey) and Vickers (Sheffield) in England, and assembled at the Taşkızak Naval Shipyard in Constantinople (Istanbul). These submarines were an attempt to gain an edge over the Greek navy (which had only one Nordenfelt submarine, a smaller and older version). However, it was quickly realized that – like the other Nordenfelt submarines ordered by Russia – they suffered from stability problems and were too easy to swamp on the surface. The Turks could not find a crew that was willing to serve on the primitive submarines. Abdül Hamid ended up rotting at dock, while Abdül Mecid was never fully completed.

=== Dissolution (1908–1922) ===
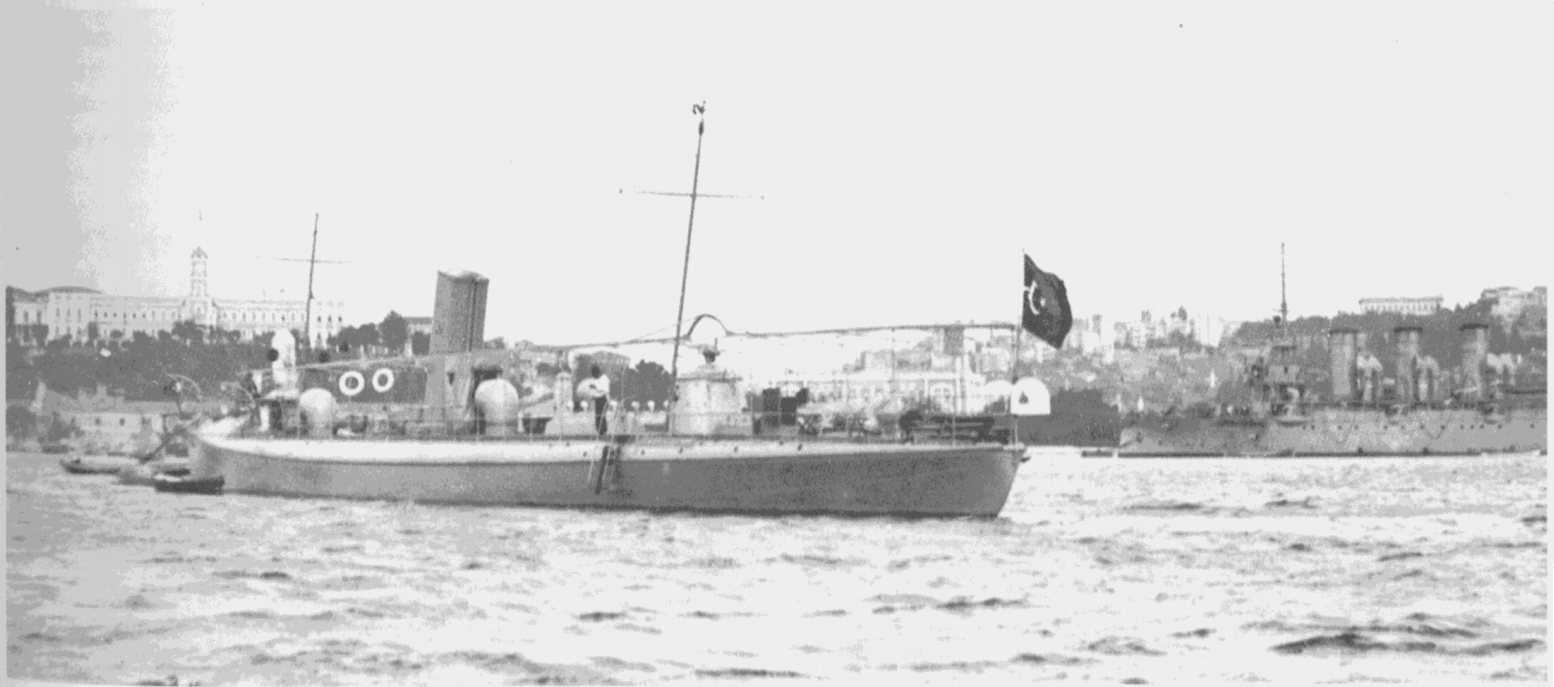
Ottoman torpedo boat Alpagot in Istanbul, 1910

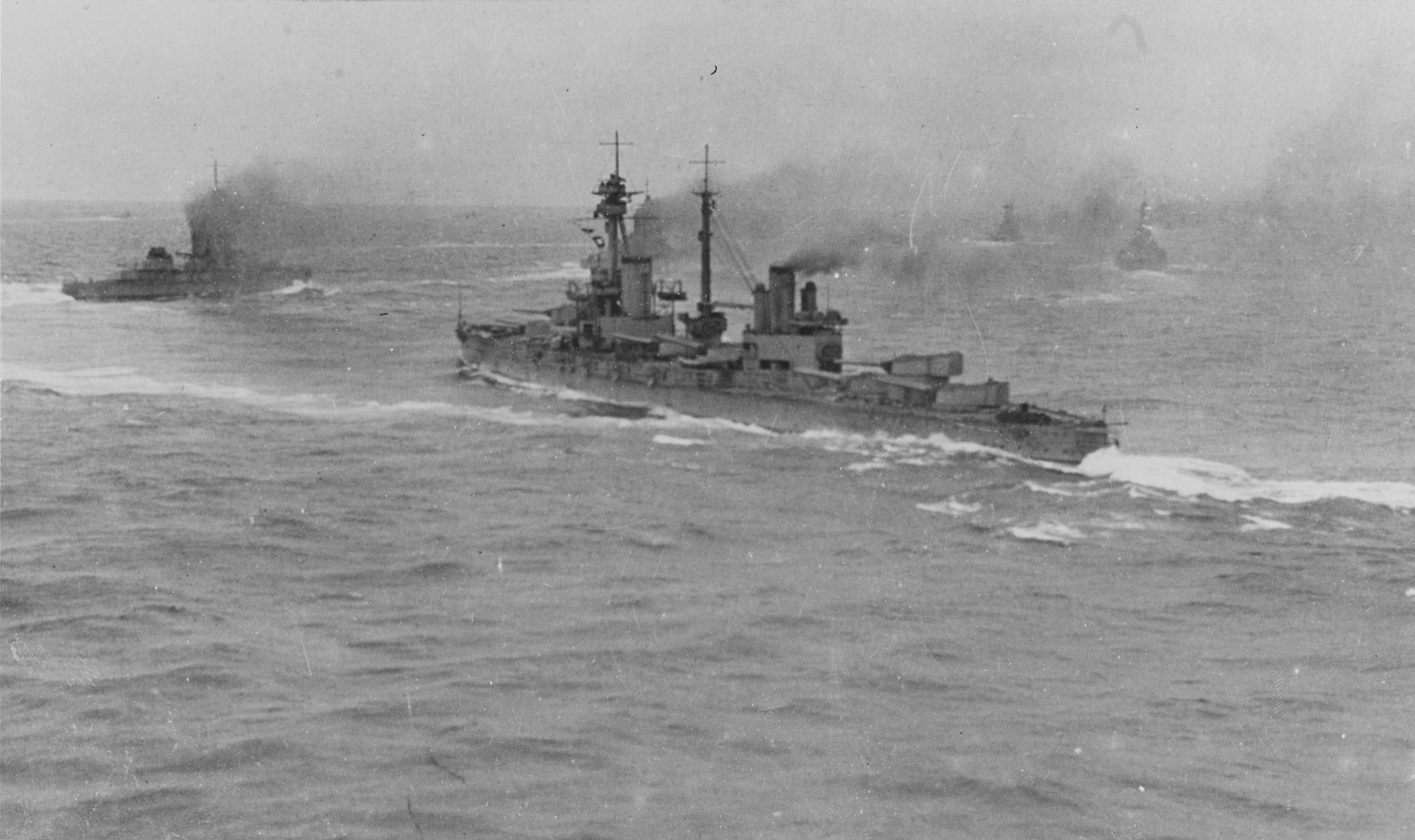
The two dreadnought battleships purchased by the Ottoman Navy but seized by the British government a short time before delivery, due to the outbreak of World War I in 1914: Sultan Osman-ı Evvel (renamed HMS Agincourt, in the foreground) and Reşadiye (renamed HMS Erin, at left).

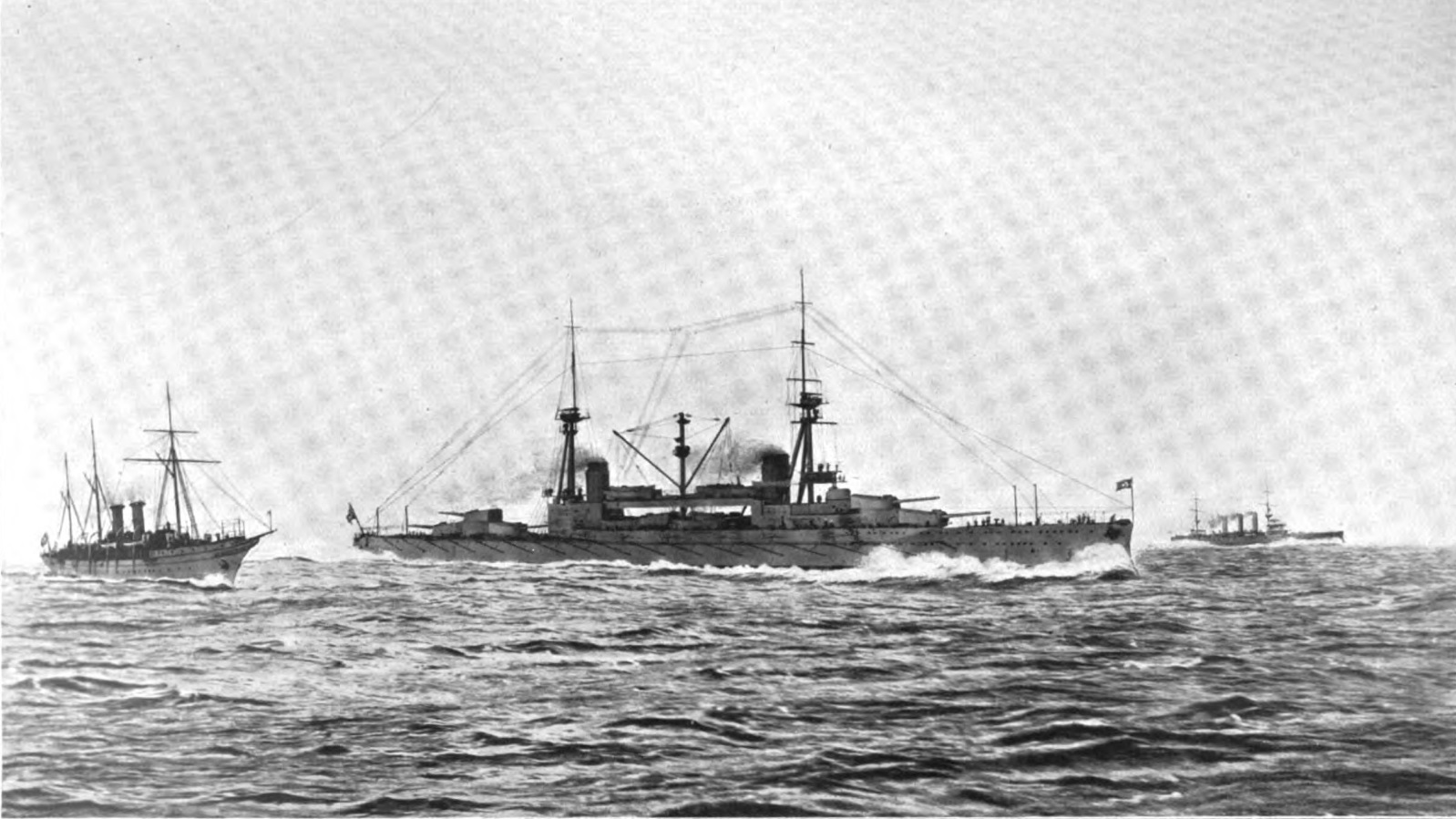
Fantasy drawing of Sultan Osman I underway for the Ottoman Navy. The royal yacht Ertuğrul is at left, and the cruiser Hamidiye is in the background.

Following the Young Turk Revolution in 1908, the Committee of Union and Progress which effectively took control of the country sought to develop a strong Ottoman naval force. The poor condition of the fleet became evident during the Ottoman Naval Parade of 1910, and the Ottoman Navy Foundation was established by the Ottoman government in order to purchase new ships through public donations. Those who made donations received different types of medals according to the size of their contributions.

In 1910, the Ottoman Navy purchased two pre-dreadnought battleships from Germany: SMS Weissenburg and her sister ship SMS Kurfürst Friedrich Wilhelm. These ships were renamed Turgut Reis and Barbaros Hayreddin, respectively.

The Italo-Turkish War of 1911–1912 and the Balkan Wars of 1912–1913 proved disastrous for the Ottoman Empire. In the former, the Italians occupied Ottoman Tripolitania (present-day Libya) and the Dodecanese Islands in the Aegean Sea and the Regia Marina defeated Ottoman light naval forces in the battles of Preveza, Beirut and Kunfuda Bay. In the latter, a smaller Greek fleet successfully engaged with Ottoman battleships in the naval skirmishes of Elli and Lemnos. The better condition of the Greek fleet in the Aegean Sea during the Balkan Wars led to the liberation of all Ottoman-held Aegean islands other than those in the Italian-occupied Dodecanese. It also prevented Ottoman reinforcements and supplies to the land battles on the Balkan peninsula, where the Balkan League emerged victorious. The only Ottoman naval successes during the Balkan Wars were the raiding actions of the light cruiser Hamidiye under the command of Rauf Orbay.

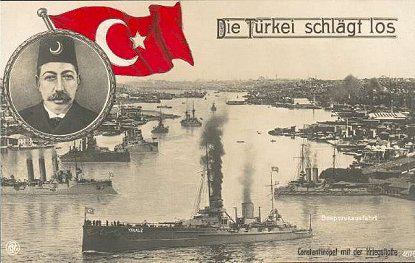
The Ottoman Navy at the Golden Horn in Constantinople, in the early days of WWI.

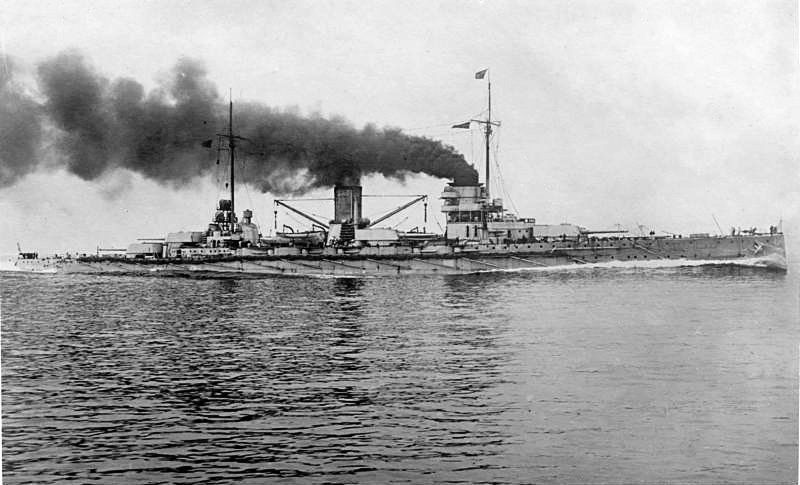
Ottoman battlecruiser Yavuz Sultan Selim (formerly SMS Goeben) in 1914

In the aftermath of the Balkan Wars, the Ottomans remained engaged in a dispute over the sovereignty of the North Aegean islands with Greece. A naval race ensued in 1913–1914, with the Ottoman Navy ordering large dreadnought battleships like Sultan Osman-ı Evvel and Reşadiye with the aforementioned public donations made to the Ottoman Navy Foundation. Although the Ottoman government had fully completed the payments for both battleships and sent a Turkish delegation to the United Kingdom to collect them after the completion of their sea trials, the British government confiscated them at the outbreak of the First World War in August 1914 and renamed them as HMS Agincourt and HMS Erin. This caused considerable ill-feeling towards Britain among the Ottoman public, and the German Empire took advantage of the situation when the battlecruiser SMS Goeben and light cruiser SMS Breslau arrived at the Dardanelles and entered service in the Ottoman Navy as Yavuz Sultan Selim and Midilli, respectively. These events significantly contributed to the Porte's decision to enter the First World War on the side of the Central Powers. However, Germany and the Ottomans had already signed a secret alliance, the Ottoman-German alliance on 2 August 1914, before the British naval seizures.

==== World War I and aftermath ====
The Ottomans' first military action in the First World War was the Black Sea raid and was a surprise attack by the Ottoman Navy on the Russian Black Sea coast on 29 October 1914. The naval raid prompted Russia and its allies, Britain and France, to declare war on the Ottoman Empire in November 1914. During WWI, the Ottoman Navy engaged the Entente Powers in the Mediterranean and Black Sea.

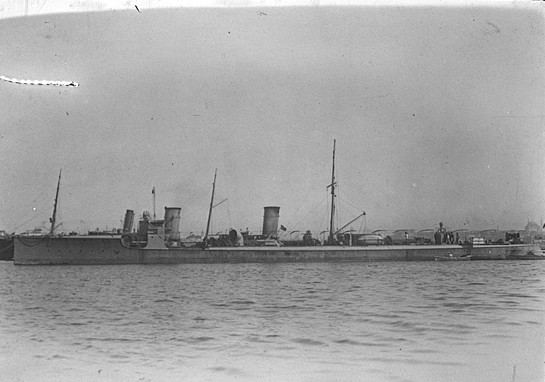
Muâvenet-i Millîye was a torpedo boat (in service between 1910 and 1923) that sank the pre-dreadnought battleship Goliath during the Battle of Gallipoli in World War I. Considered in the same league as the minelayer Nusret in terms of the role that she played in the naval engagements during the battle, Muâvenet-i Millîye strongly influenced the course of the conflicts by generating a domino effect which caused the failure of the Entente strategy.

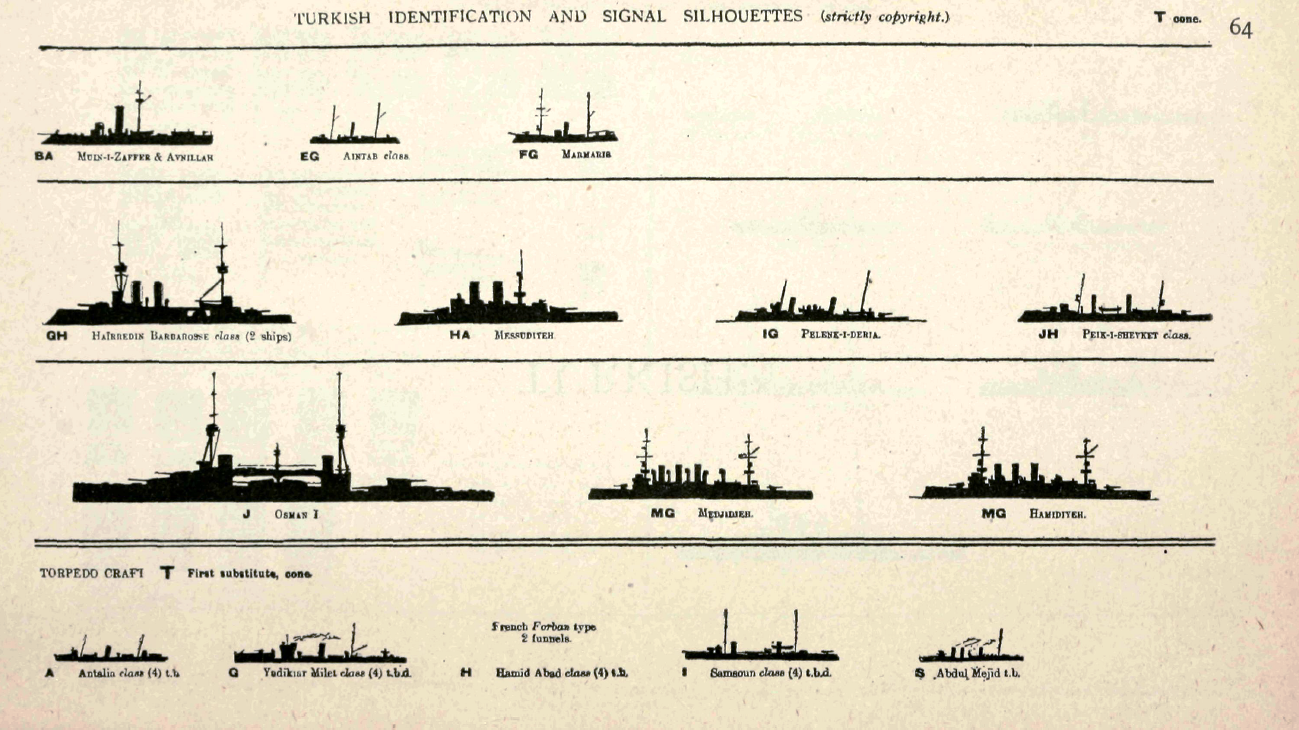
Silhouettes of the warships of the Ottoman Navy, as projected for 1914 (including the undelivered dreadnought Sultan Osman-ı Evvel)

In 1915 at the Battle of Gallipoli, the British and French fleets failed to pass through the Dardanelles Strait (Çanakkale Boğazı) thanks to the heavy Turkish fortifications lining the Strait, mining by Turkish minelayers like Nusret, and fierce fighting by the Turkish soldiers on land, sea and air. During the battle, the British submarine HMS E11 sank Barbaros Hayreddin on 8 August 1915.

In the last year of World War I, while returning from a bombardment mission of the Allied port of Mudros on the Greek island of Lemnos, Midilli ran into a minefield between Lemnos and Gökçeada on 20 January 1918, and sank after being severely damaged by five consecutive mine hits. During the mission, Midilli, together with Yavuz Sultan Selim, had managed to sink the British warships HMS Raglan and HMS M28, as well as a 2,000-ton transport ship, and had bombarded the port of Mudros, together with the communication posts and air fields of the Entente on the other parts of Lemnos. The battlecruiser Yavuz Sultan Selim became one of the most active Ottoman warships throughout the First World War; she bombarded numerous ports on the Black Sea and Aegean Sea, while engaging with Russian dreadnought battleships of the Imperatritsa Mariya class and sinking a number of Russian and British warships and transport vessels.

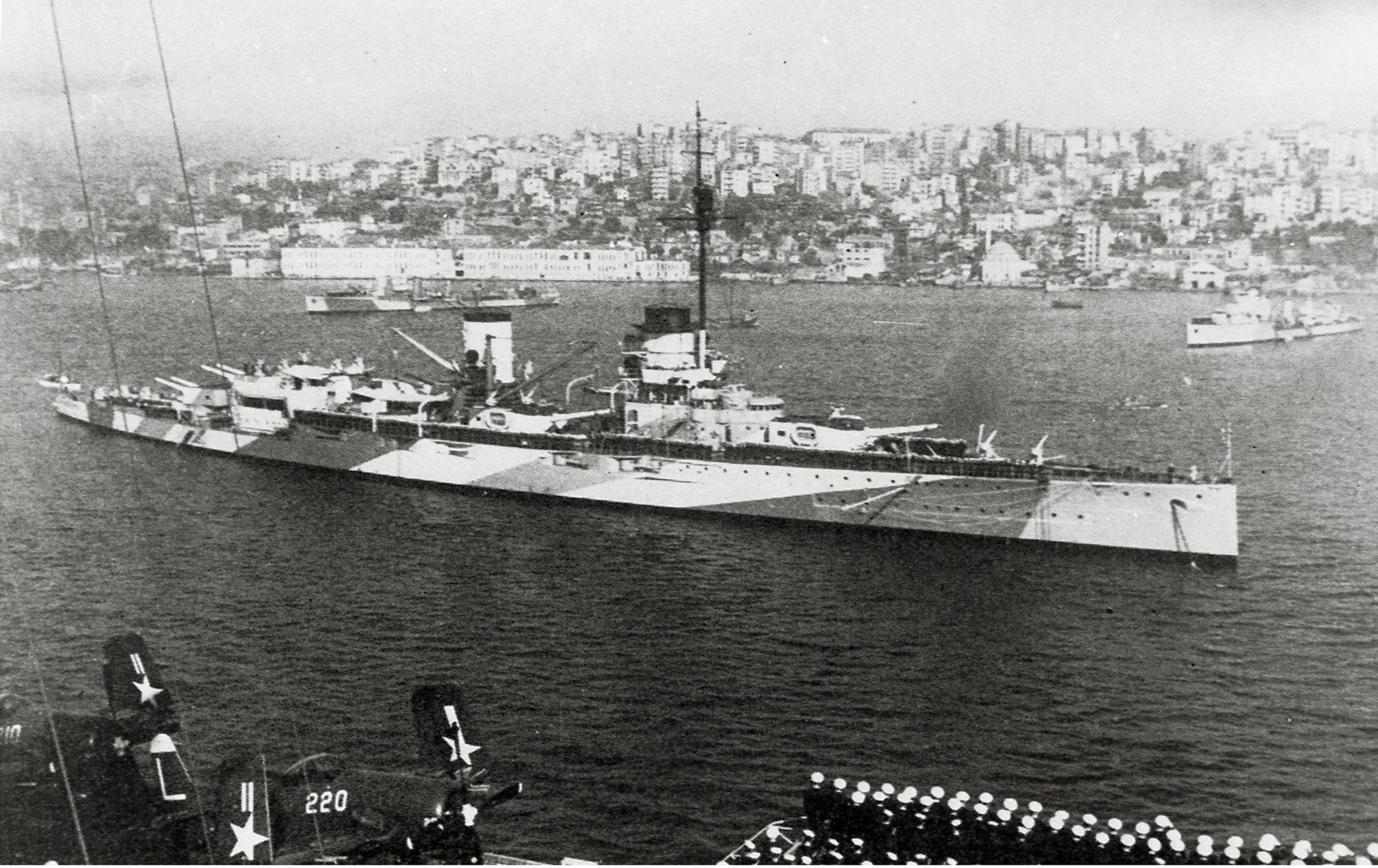
TCG Yavuz (B-70) in Istanbul, 1947

Following the end of World War I, the victorious Entente dissolved the Ottoman Navy and the large ships of the Ottoman fleet were towed to the Prince Islands in the Sea of Marmara under the control of Allied warships, or locked inside the Golden Horn. Some of them were scrapped.

After the independence of the Republic of Turkey in 1923, the remaining major warships of the former Ottoman fleet, such as the battlecruiser TCG Yavuz, the pre-dreadnought battleship TCG Turgut Reis, protected cruisers TCG Hamidiye and TCG Mecidiye, torpedo cruisers Berk-i Satvet and Peyk-i Şevket, destroyers TCG Samsun, TCG Basra and TCG Taşoz, and torpedo boats TCG Burak Reis, TCG Kemal Reis, TCG Îsâ Reis and TCG Sakız were overhauled, repaired and modernized in the 1920s, while new ships and submarines were acquired starting from the early 1930s.

== Admirals ==
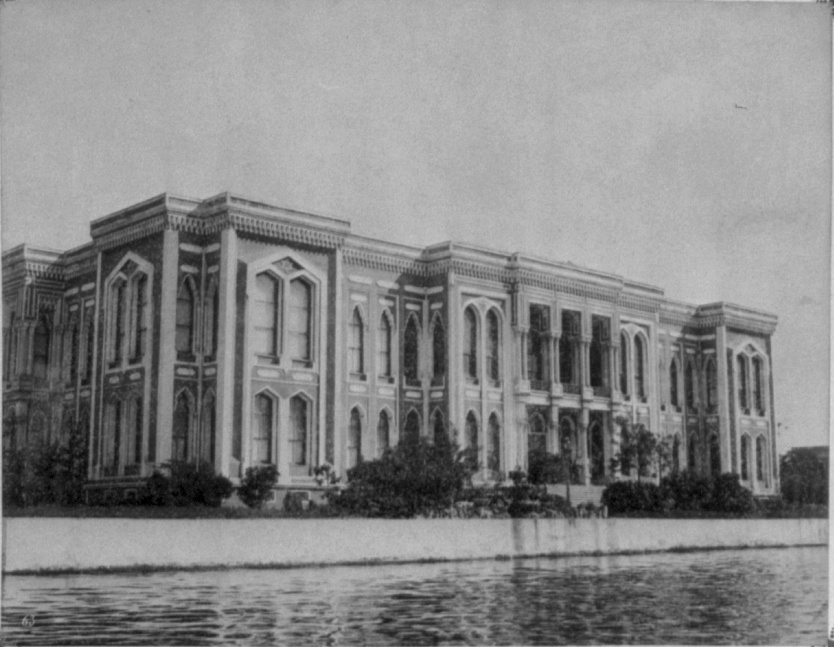
Ottoman Ministry of the Navy (Bahriye Nezareti) in the Kasımpaşa quarter of the Beyoğlu district in Istanbul, along the northern shoreline of the Golden Horn. It is currently the headquarters of the Northern Sea Area Command (Kuzey Deniz Saha Komutanlığı) of the Turkish Navy.

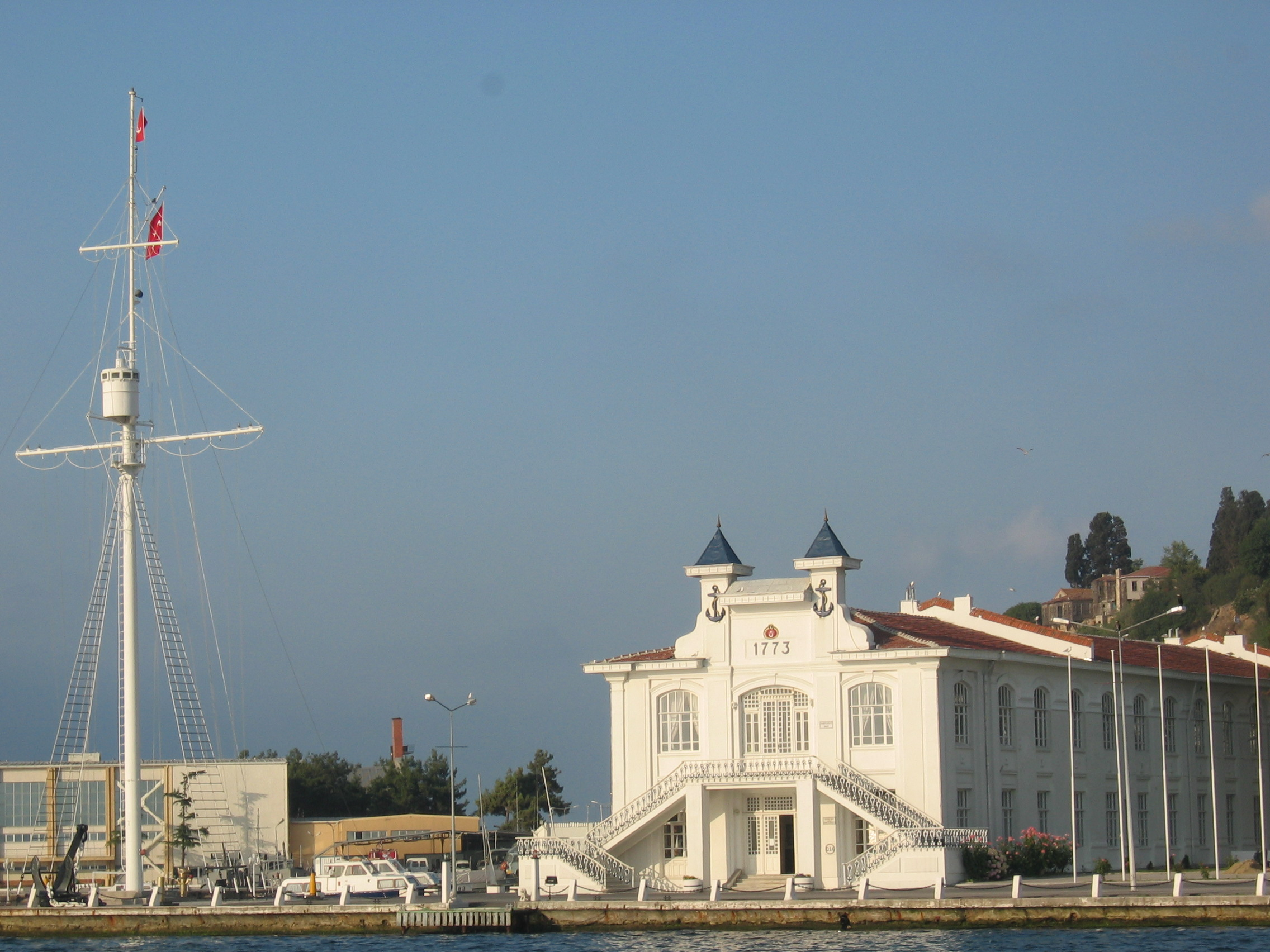
Turkish Naval High School (1773) in Heybeliada Island near Istanbul.

Famed Ottoman admirals include:

- Kemal Reis, who twice defeated the Venetian fleet at the First Battle of Lepanto in 1499 and the Second Battle of Lepanto in 1500
- Hayreddin Barbarossa, who defeated the fleet of the Holy League of Charles V under the command of Andrea Doria at the island of Peñón in 1531, Battle of Preveza in 1538 and Algiers in 1541
- Turgut Reis (known as Dragut in the West), who conquered Libya in 1551 and defeated the fleet of Charles V under the command of Andrea Doria at the Battle of Ponza in 1552
- Piyale Pasha, who defeated the Holy League of Philip II of Spain under the command of Giovanni Andrea Doria at the Battle of Djerba in 1560
- Aruj, who established the Ottoman presence in North Africa which lasted four centuries
- Salih Reis, who conquered Morocco in 1553 and extended Ottoman territory into the Atlantic Ocean
- Uluç (Kılıç) Ali Reis, who restored the Ottoman domination of the Mediterranean after the Third Battle of Lepanto in 1571 and conquered Tunisia from Spain in 1574
- Murat Reis, who fought the Portuguese in the Indian Ocean between 1552 and 1554 and captured Lanzarote of the Canary Islands in the Atlantic Ocean in 1585
- Seydi Ali Reis (known as Sidi Ali Reis in the West), who fought the Portuguese in the Indian Ocean in 1554 and is famous for his books of travel which have been translated into many languages
- Kurtoğlu Muslihiddin Reis (known as Curtogoli in the West), who played an important role in the conquests of Egypt in 1517 and Rhodes in 1522, and established the Ottoman Indian Ocean Fleet based in Suez which was later commanded by his son, Kurtoğlu Hızır Reis, who led the Ottoman naval expedition to Aceh (1568–1569) which marked the easternmost territorial expansion of the Ottoman Empire

The Ottoman admiral and cartographer Piri Reis crafted maps and books of navigation, including his first world map (1513) which is one of the oldest surviving maps of America and possibly the oldest surviving map of Antarctica. The first world map (1513) and second world map (1528) of Piri Reis are today preserved at the Library of Topkapı Palace in Istanbul. Other works of Piri Reis are preserved at the Naval Museum in Istanbul.

== Istanbul Naval Museum ==
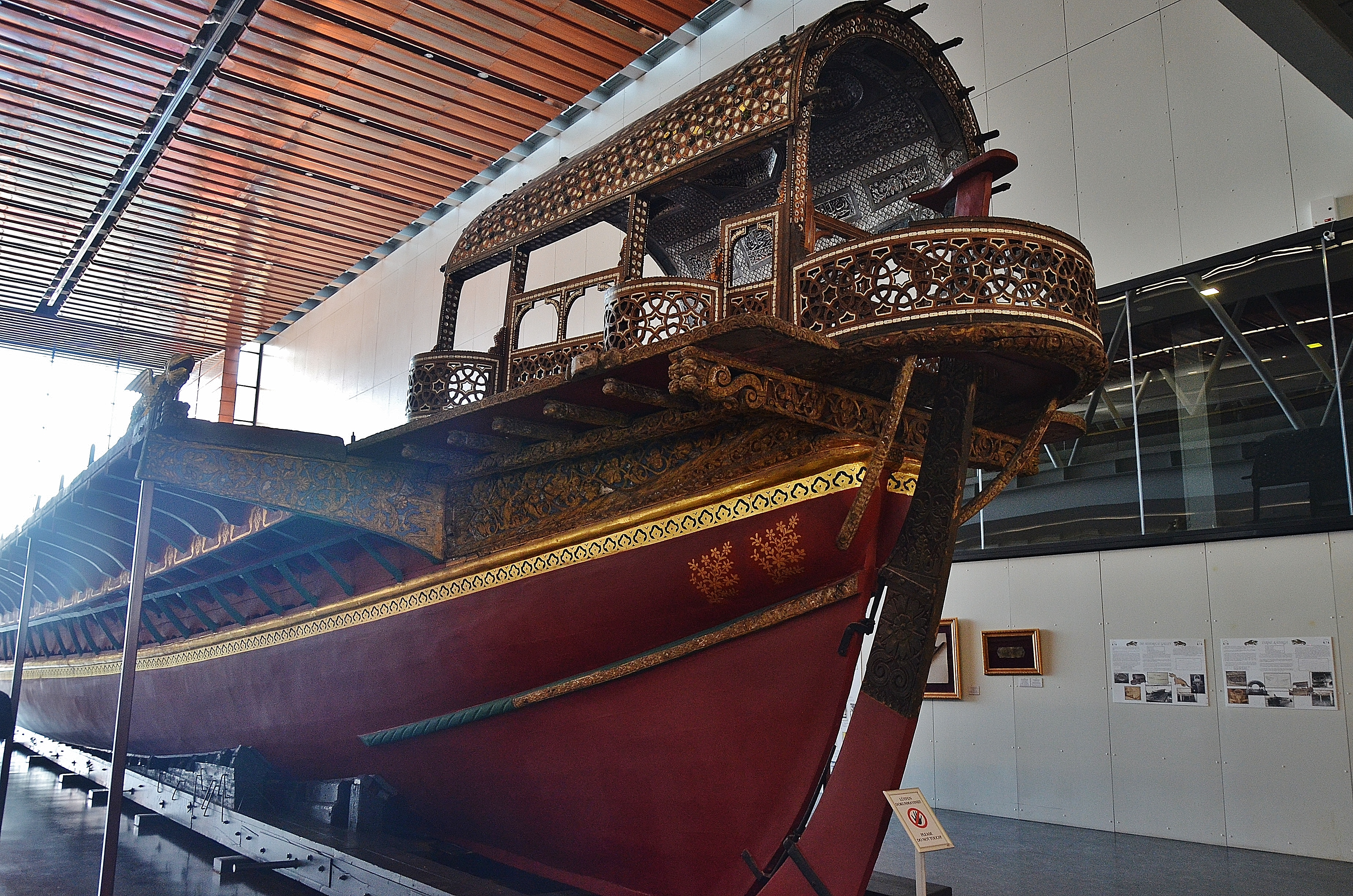
Late 16th or early 17th century Ottoman galley known as Tarihi Kadırga at the Istanbul Naval Museum, built in the period between the reigns of Sultan Murad III (1574–1595) and Sultan Mehmed IV (1648–1687), as evidenced by AMS radiocarbon dating and dendrochronological research. She is the only surviving original galley in the world, and has the world's oldest continuously maintained wooden hull.

The Istanbul Naval Museum is located in the Beşiktaş district of Istanbul, Turkey. It was established in 1897 by the Ottoman Minister of the Navy (Bahriye Nazırı) Bozcaadalı Hasan Hüsnü Pasha.

The museum contains an important collection of military artifacts pertaining to the Ottoman Navy. In the maritime field, it is Turkey's largest museum, with a great variety of collections. Around 20,000 pieces are present in its collection, including the late 16th or early 17th century Ottoman Navy galley known as Tarihi Kadırga, built in the period between the reigns of Sultan Murad III (1574–1595) and Sultan Mehmed IV (1648–1687), as evidenced by AMS radiocarbon dating and dendrochronological research. She is the only surviving original galley in the world, and has the world's oldest continuously maintained wooden hull.

Being connected to the Turkish Naval Forces Command, it is also the country's first military museum.

In the early 21st century a new exhibition building was constructed. The construction began in 2008, and the building was reopened on October 4, 2013. It has two floors above ground level and one basement floor, all covering 20,000 m^{2} (220,000 sq ft).

The basement consists of diverse items like figureheads, ornaments of naval ships, ship models, and pieces of the Byzantine chain that was used for blocking the entrance of the Golden Horn during the Ottoman conquest of Constantinople (Istanbul) in 1453. In the first and second floors, a large number of imperial and other caïques are exhibited.

Many exhibition items underwent special restoration and conservation works due to deformation of the raw materials caused by heat, light, humidity, atmospheric conditions, vandalism and other factors.

== Gallery ==
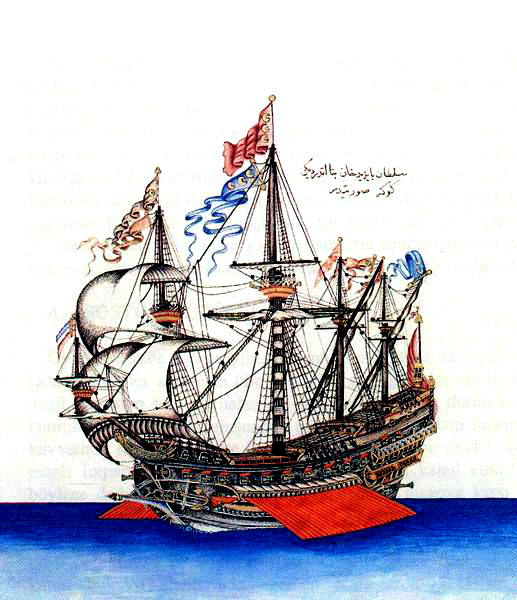
Göke (1495) was the flagship of Kemal Reis

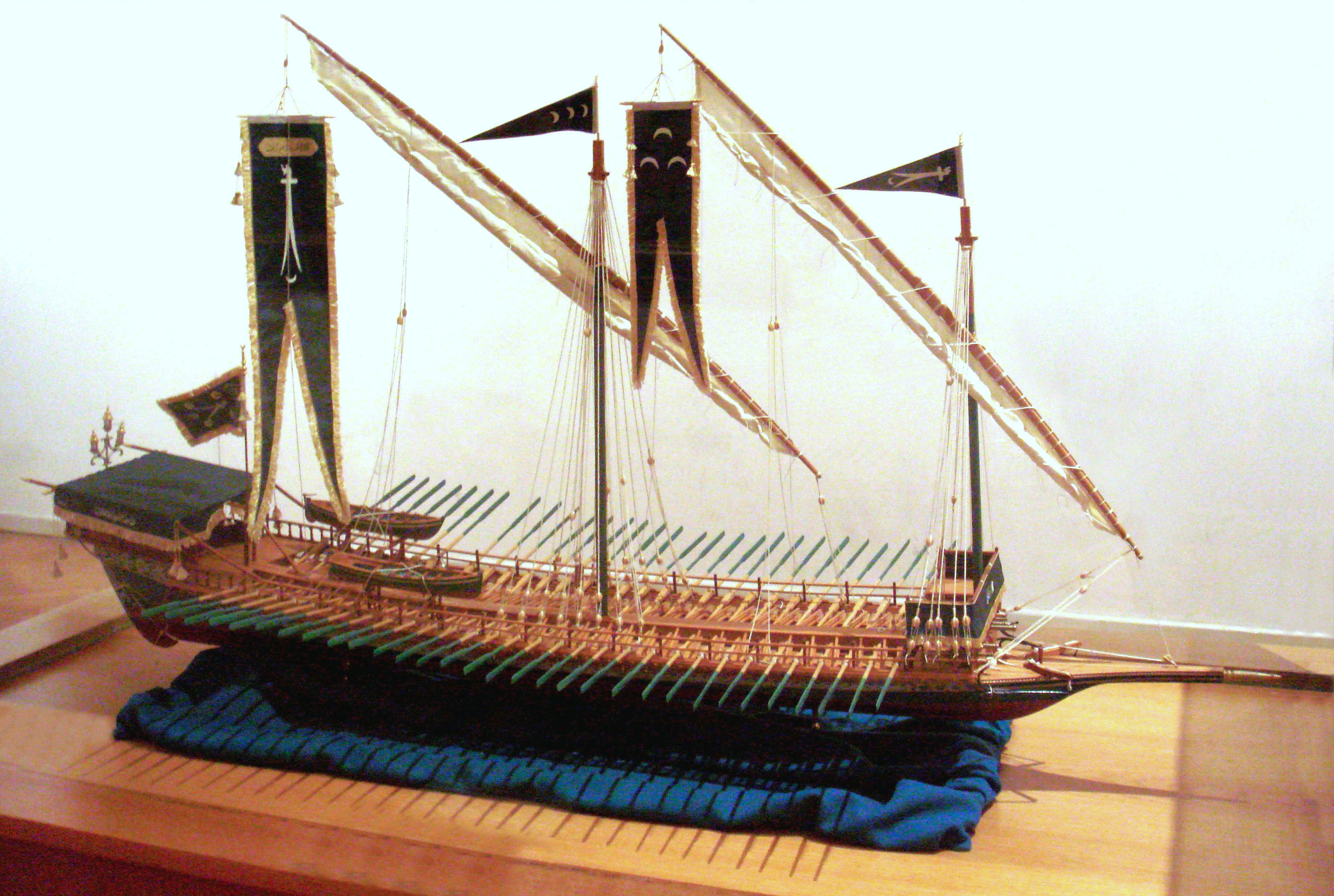
Barbarossa's galley during his campaign in France (1543–1544)

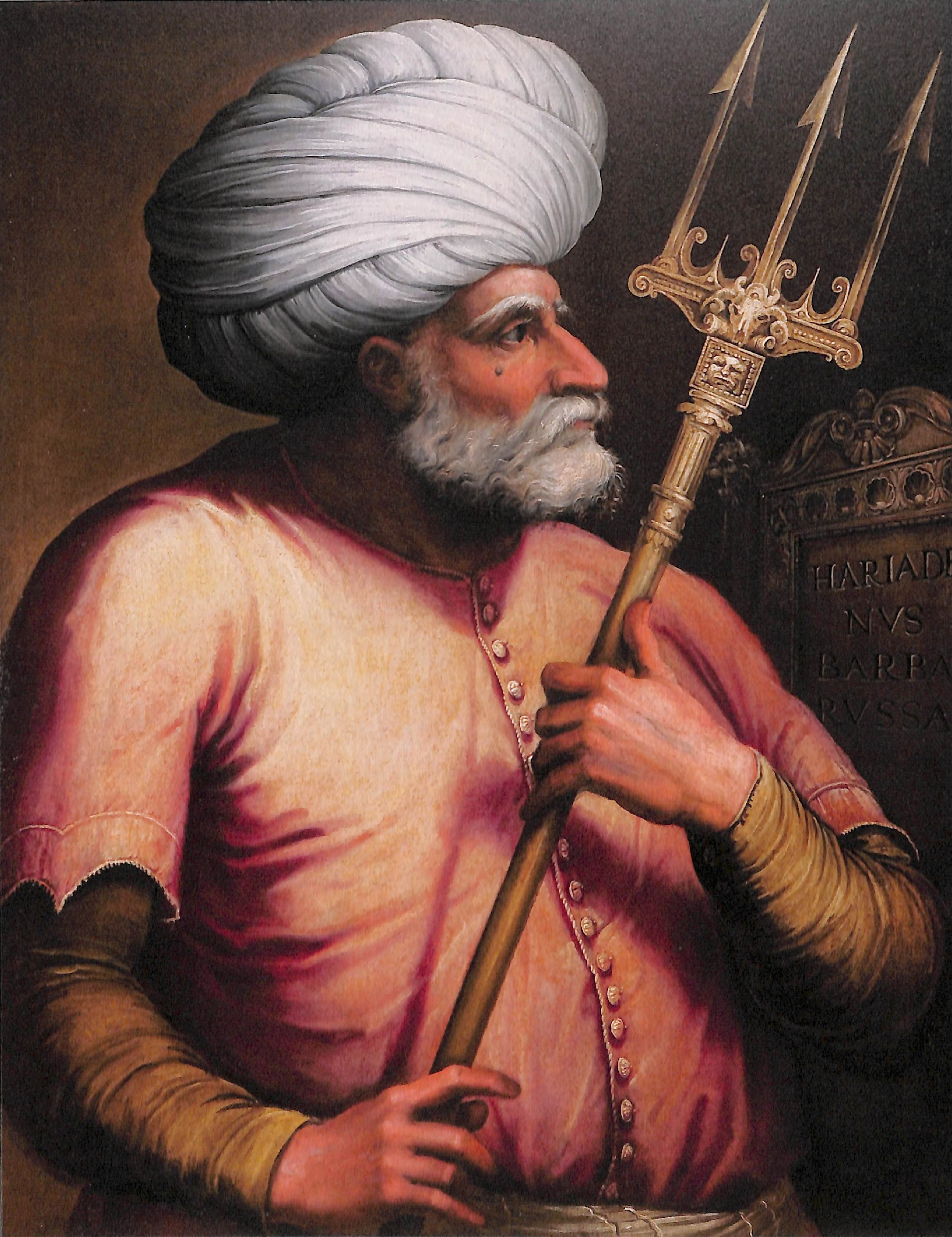
Hayreddin Barbarossa

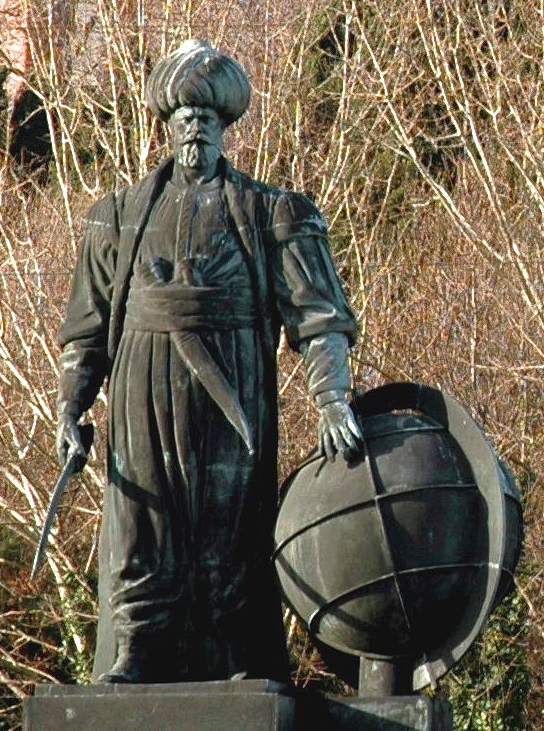
Turgut Reis

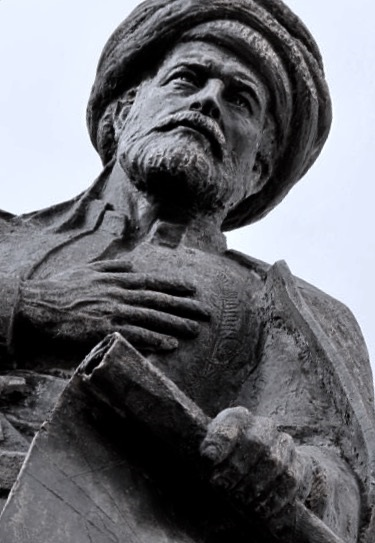
Piri Reis

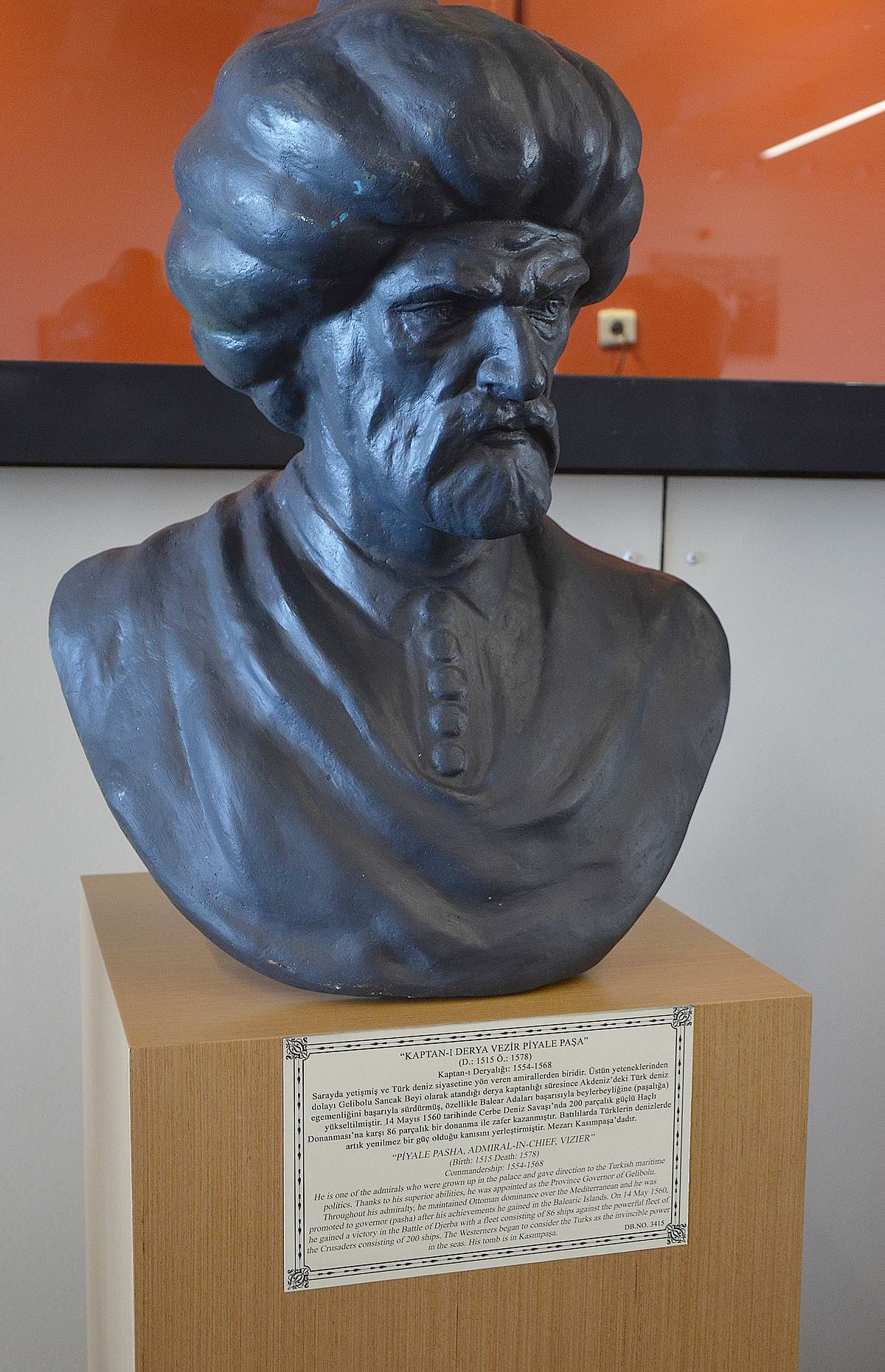
Piyale Pasha

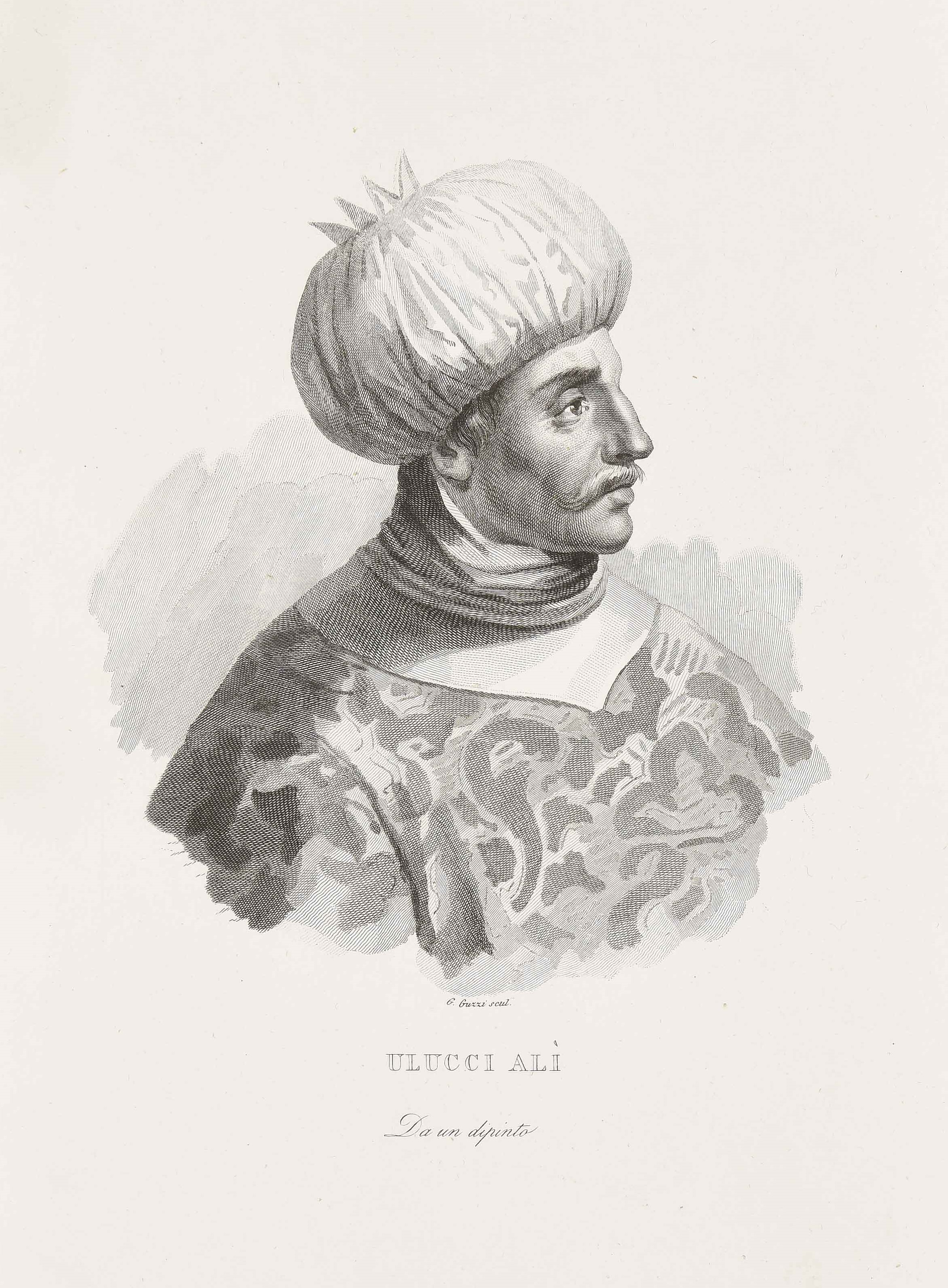
Uluç Ali Reis

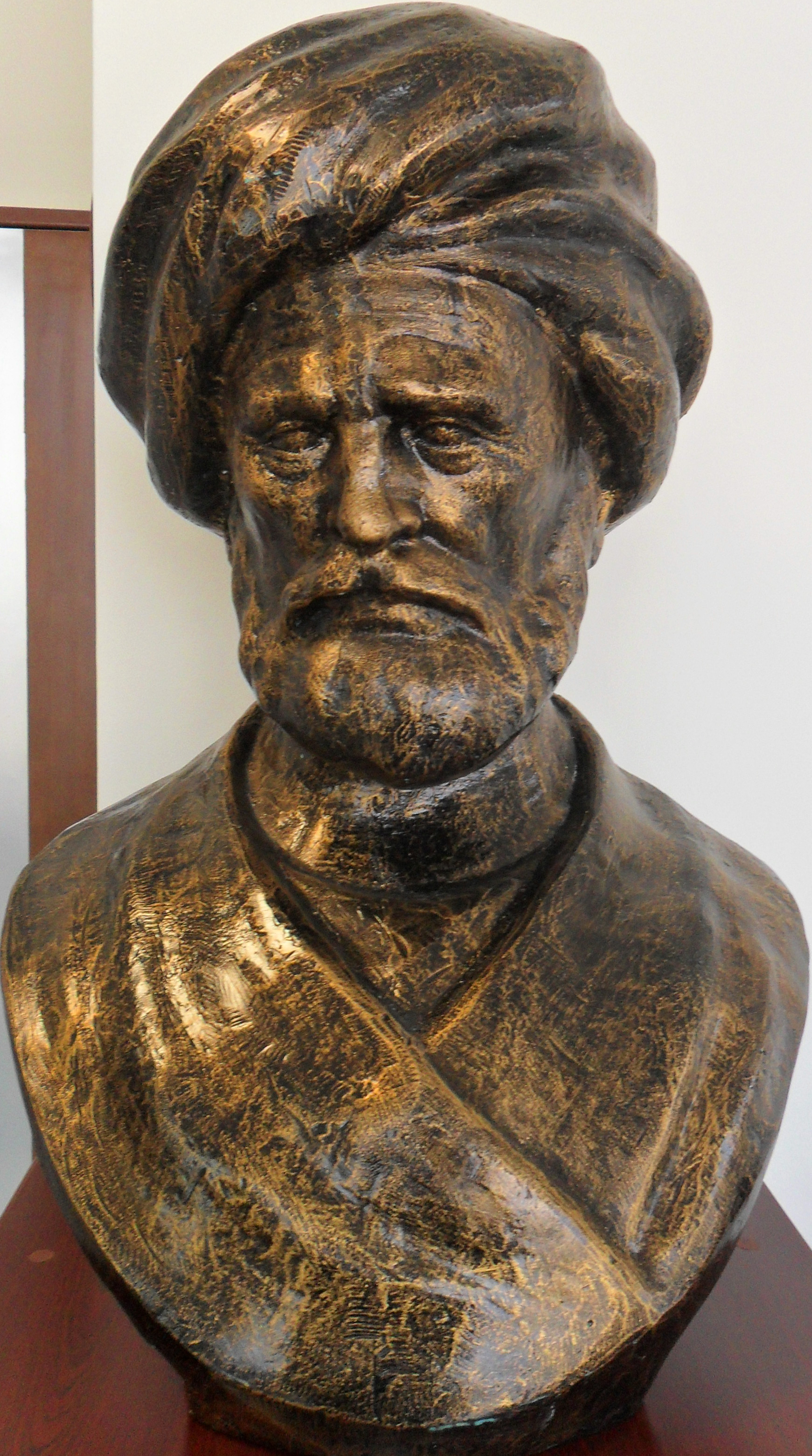
Gazi Hasan Pasha

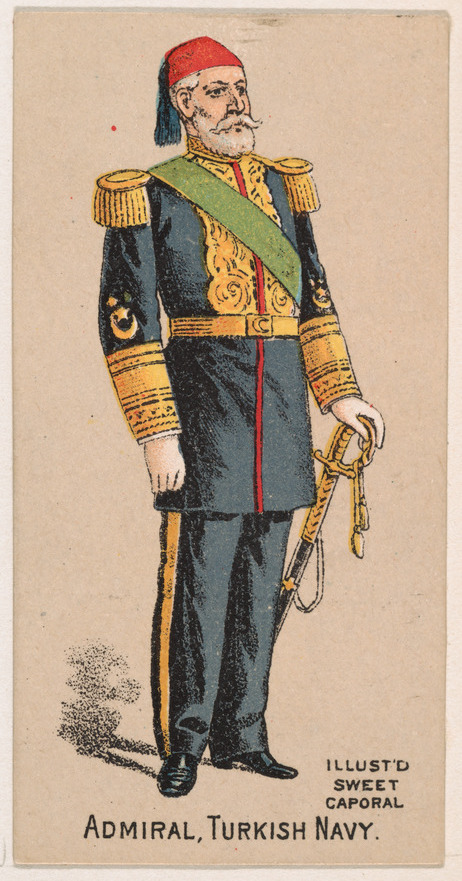
Ottoman Admiral uniform (1888)

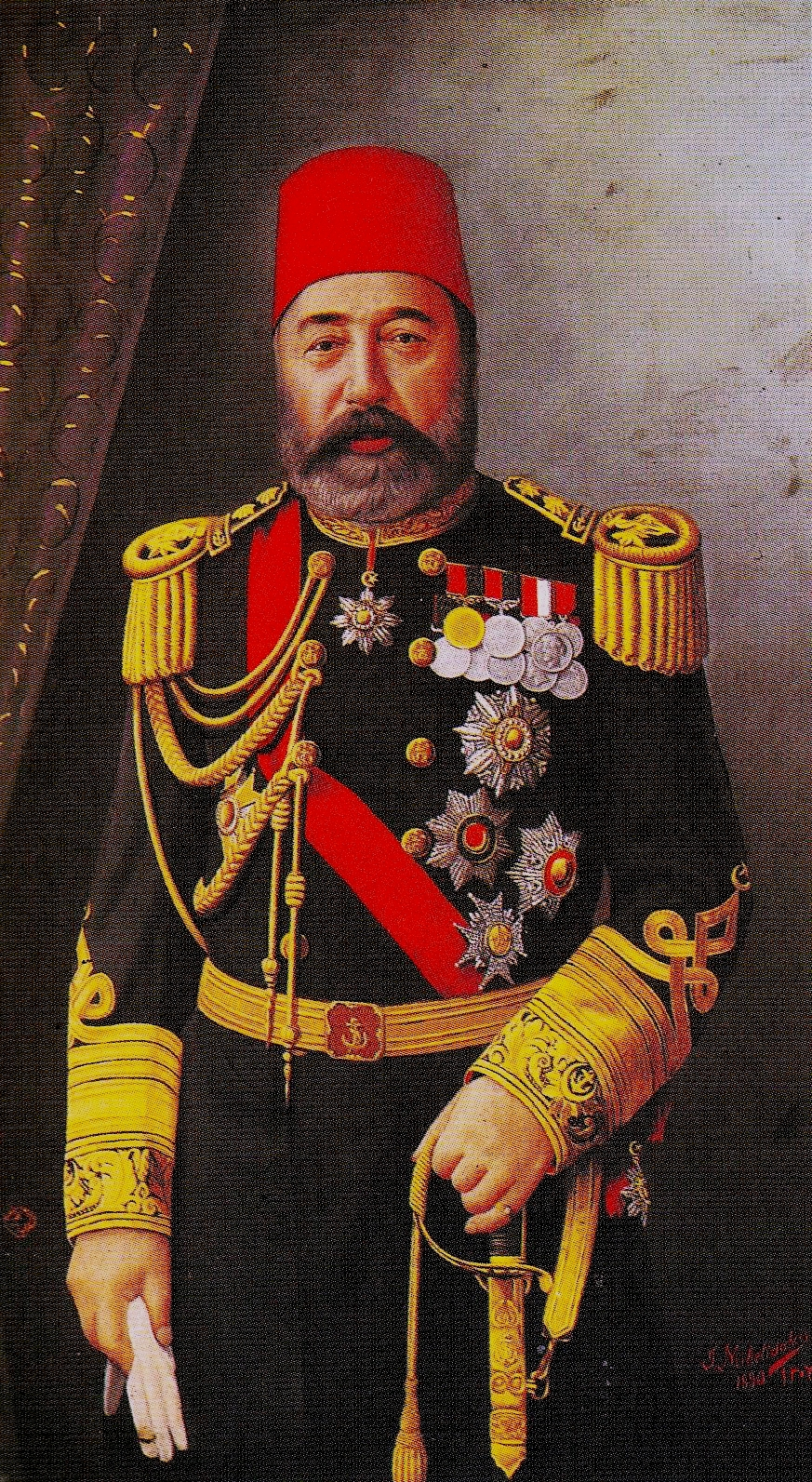
Bozcaadalı Hasan Hüsnü Pasha (1890)

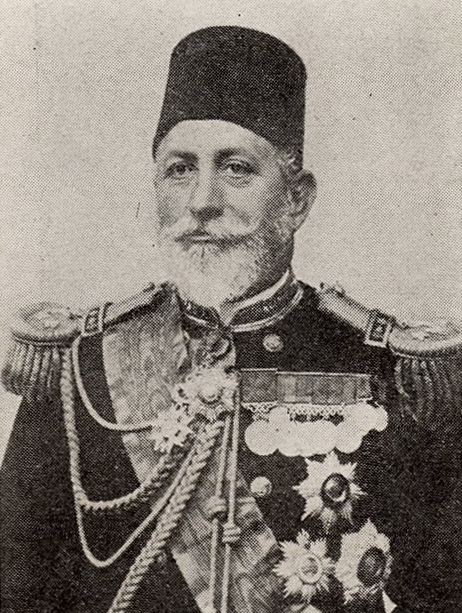
Hasan Rami Pasha

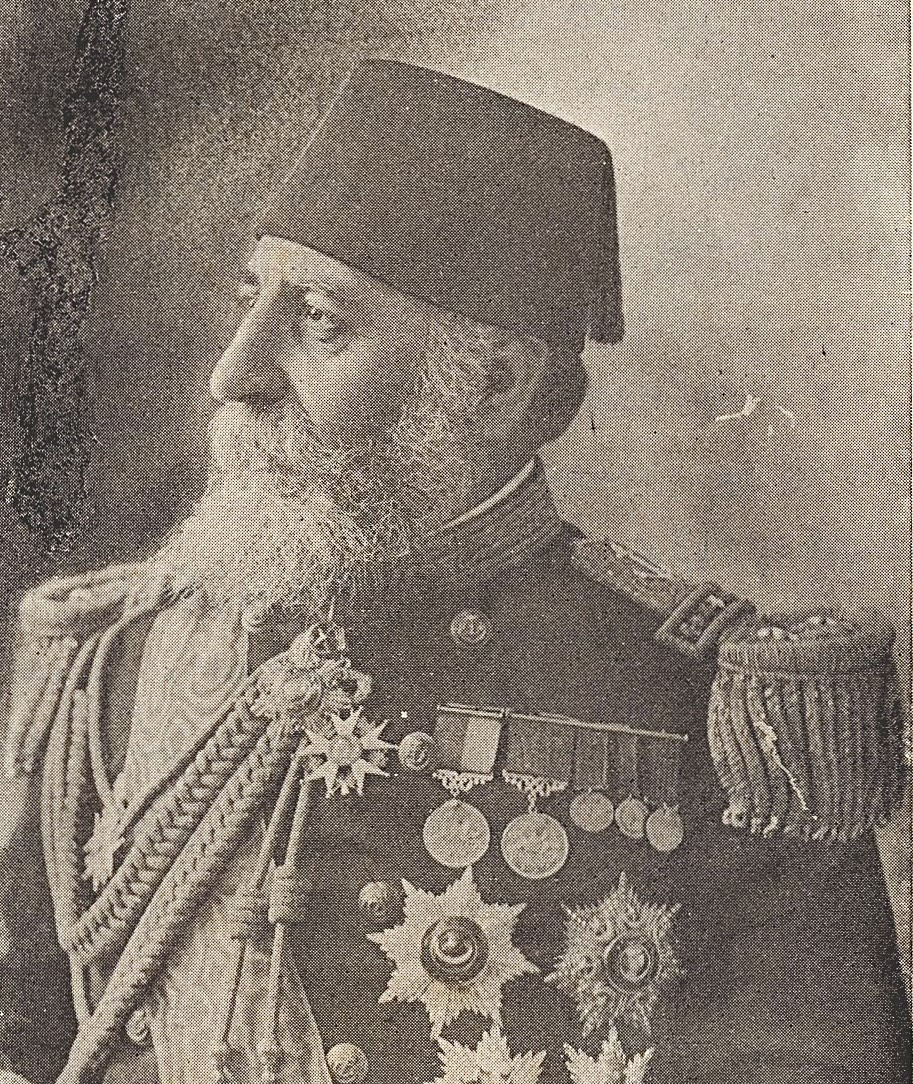
Hüseyin Hüsnü Pasha

Ali Sami Bey

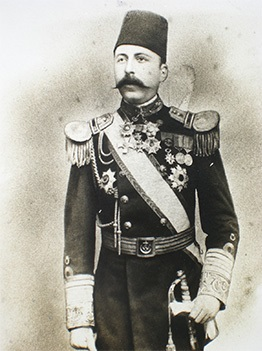
Ali Osman Pasha

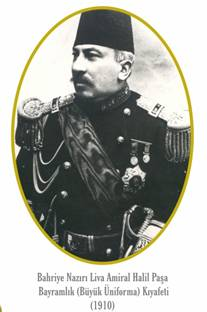
Halil Pasha (1910)

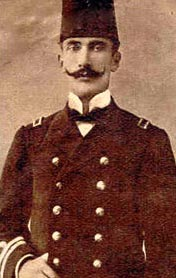
Fuat Hüsnü Kayacan

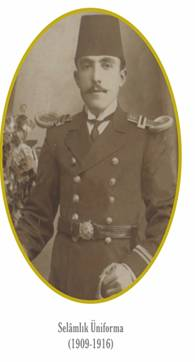
Naval uniform (1909–1916)

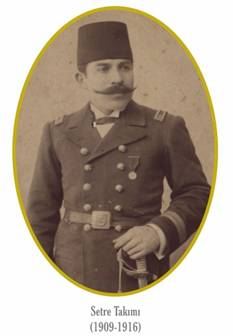
Naval uniform (1909–1916)

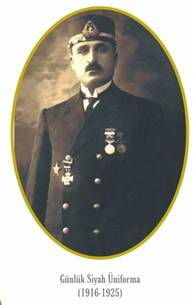
Naval uniform (1916–1925)

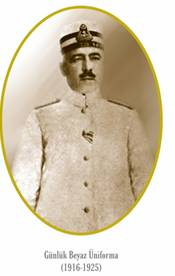
Naval uniform (1916–1925)

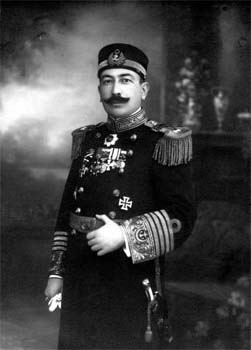
Muzaffer Adil Bey

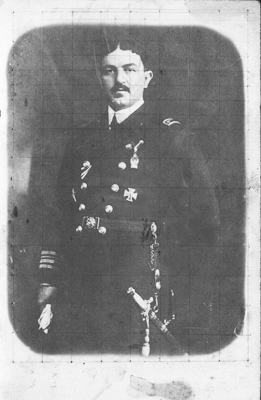
Rauf Orbay

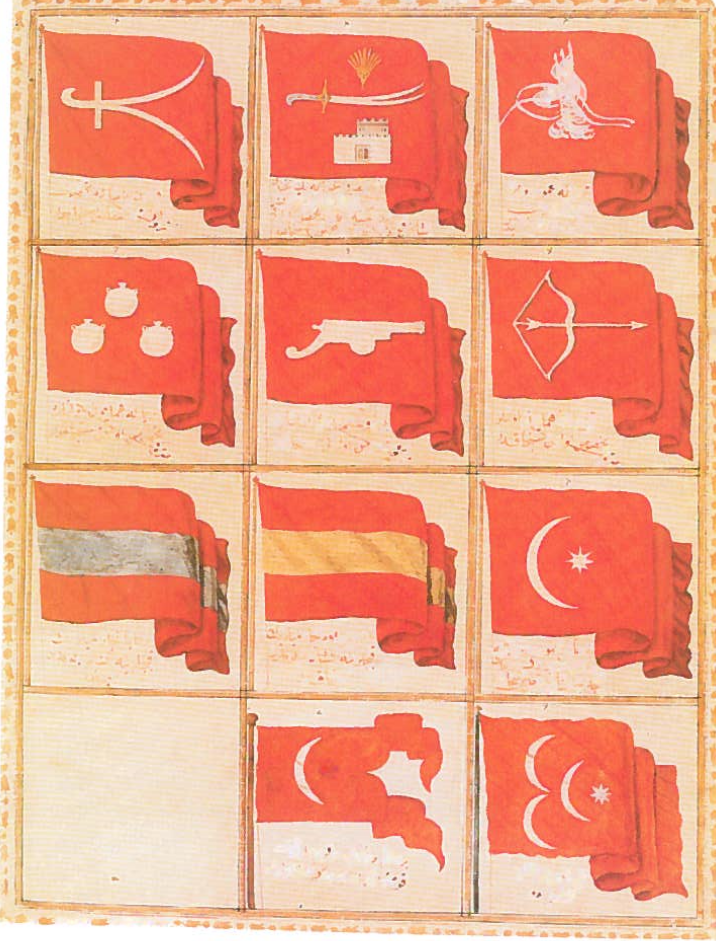
Various flags

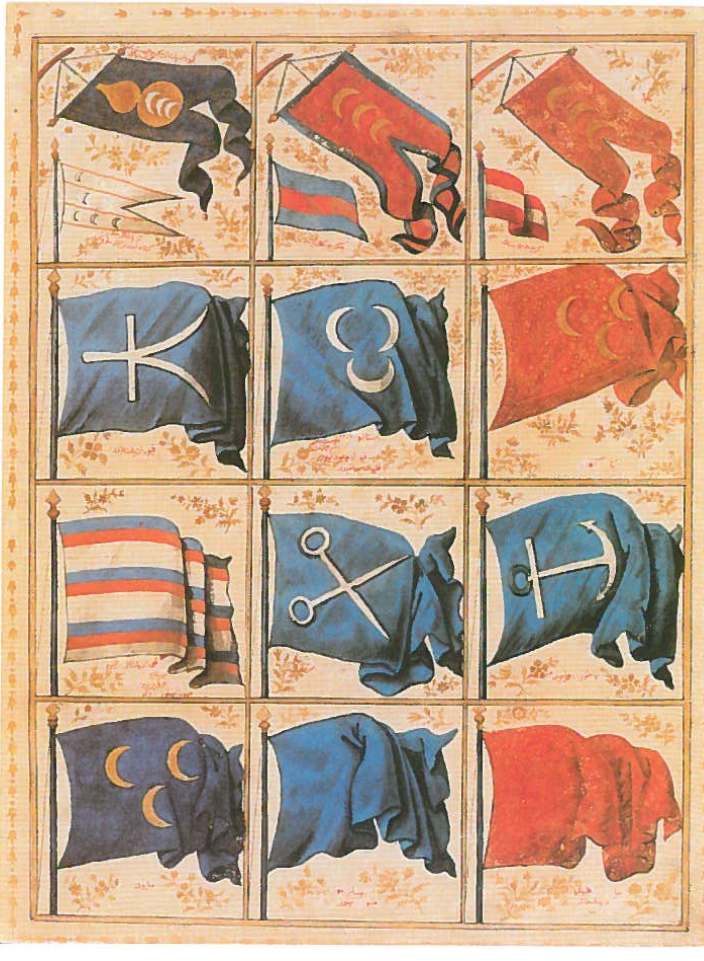
Various flags

== Ships ==
- List of battleships of the Ottoman Empire
- List of cruisers of the Ottoman Navy
- List of major surface ships of the Ottoman steam navy
- List of mine warfare vessels of the Ottoman steam navy
- List of non-combat vessels of the Ottoman steam navy
- List of patrol vessels of the Ottoman steam navy
- List of sail frigates of the Ottoman Empire
- List of ships of the line of the Ottoman Empire
- List of wrecked or lost ships of the Ottoman steam navy

== See also ==
- List of Ottoman sieges and landings
- List of fleet commanders of the Ottoman Navy
- List of Kapudan Pashas
- Turkish Navy

== Bibliography ==
- E. Hamilton Currey, Sea-Wolves of the Mediterranean (London, 1910). ISBN 978-1500883430
- Bono, Salvatore: Corsari nel Mediterraneo (Corsairs in the Mediterranean) (Perugia, Oscar Storia Mondadori, 1993); Corsari nel Mediterraneo: Condottieri di ventura. Online database in Italian, based on Salvatore Bono's book.
- Bradford, Ernle, The Sultan's Admiral: The life of Barbarossa (London, 1968). ISBN 978-1845117931
- Wolf, John B., The Barbary Coast: Algeria under the Turks (New York, 1979). ISBN 978-0393012057
- Melis, Nicola, "The importance of Hormuz for Luso-Ottoman Gulf-centred policies in the 16th century: Some observations based on contemporary sources", in R. Loureiro-D. Couto (eds.), Revisiting Hormuz – Portuguese Interactions in the Persian Gulf Region in the Early Modern Period (Wiesbaden, Harrassowitz, 2008, 107–120 (Maritime Asia, 19).
- Tuncay Zorlu, Innovation and Empire in Turkey: Sultan Selim III and the Modernisation of the Ottoman Navy (London, I.B. Tauris, 2011). ISBN 978-1848857827

== Representations in popular culture ==
- The Ottoman Navy and Admiral Hayreddin Barbarossa are depicted in the novel The Sultan's Admiral: Barbarossa: Pirate and Empire Builder by Ernle Bradford.
- The Ottoman Navy, Admiral Turgut Reis, and the Siege of Malta are depicted in the novel The Religion by Tim Willocks.
- The Ottoman Navy and Admiral Kemal Reis are portrayed in the novel The Sultan's Helmsman by Robert Colburn.
