= List of major surface ships of the Ottoman steam navy =

This is a list of major ships of the Ottoman Steam Navy:

== Wooden-hulled warships ==
=== Ship of the line (Kalyon) ===
==== Peyk-i Zafer (screw ship of the line) ====
Name (Namesake)	Builder Dimensions Displacement, Hull Speed Complement	Machinery Boiler, Bunkers Engines Armament	Ordered Laid down Launched Trials	Commissioned Decommissioned Afterward
Peyk-i Zafer ("Satellite of Victory")	Tersâne-i Âmire, Sinop, Sinop; LPP 66.6m, B 17.0m, D 8.8m 3125t BM, Wood; 9.5kts 750	Steam, 1 shaft 2 tubular, 315t coal Horizontal direct acting 2 cyl., 2500ihp, R Naipier; 86xguns (1842), 32x62pdr, 30x45pdr, 16x33pdr (1860)	1840; 1841; 1841; 1842	1842; 1878; 1894 sold for breaking up.

==== Kosova (screw ship of the line) ====
Name (Namesake)	Builder Dimensions Displacement, Hull Speed Complement	Machinery Boiler, Bunkers Engines Armament	Ordered Laid down Launched Trials	Commissioned Decommissioned Afterward
Kosova (Kosovo)	Tersâne-i Âmire, Istanbul, Constantinople; LOA 93.8m, LPP 90.3m, B 17.8m, D 7.3m 3464t BM, Wood - 800	Steam, 1 shaft 4, - 1 set horizontal single acting, 3600ihp, Maudslay; 32x62pdr, 34x45pdr (1865), 1x203mm ML A, 34x45pdr (1875), Disarmed (1878)	1851; 1855; 1858; 1864	1864; 1883

==== Fethiye class (screw ship of the line) ====
Name (Namesake)	Builder Dimensions Displacement, Hull Speed Complement	Machinery Boiler, Bunkers Engines Armament	Ordered Laid down Launched Trials	Commissioned Decommissioned Afterward
Fethiye ("Conquest")	Tersâne-i Âmire, Istanbul, Constantinople; LPP 69.4m, B 17.2m, D 8.2m 3526t BM / 3380t, Wood; 9kts 800	Steam, 1 shaft 2, 350t coal 1 single acting 2cyl., R Naipier; 32x62pdr, 30x45pdr, 4x33pdr (1858), 1x150pdr A, 34x45pdr (1875), Disarmed (1889)	1853; 1853; 30 Nov 1856; 1858	1858; 1903; 1911 sold for breaking up.
Şadiye ("Happiness")	Tersâne-i Âmire, İzmit, İzmit; LPP 69.4m, B 17.2m, D 8.2m 3526t BM / 3380t, Wood; 9kts 800	Steam, 1 shaft 2, 350t coal 1 single acting 2cyl., R Naipier; 32x62pdr, 30x45pdr, 4x33pdr (1858), 1x150pdr A, 34x45pdr (1875)	1853; 1853; 1856; 1858	1858; 1878; 1904 sold for breaking up.

=== Frigate (Fırkateyn) ===
==== Mecidiye class (paddle frigate) ====
Name (Namesake)	Builder Dimensions Displacement, Hull Speed Complement	Machinery Boiler, Bunkers Engines Armament	Ordered Laid down Launched Trials	Commissioned Decommissioned Afterward
Mecidiye (Abdülmecid I)	Tersâne-i Âmire, Istanbul, Constantinople; LOA 69.1m, B 11.7m, D 5.1m 1443t BM, Wood; 9kts 320	Steam, side paddle 2, 150t coal 1 direct action 2 cyl., 900ihp, Maudslay, Sons & Field; 2xlong 10 inch iron Paixhan guns on traversing carriages on upper deck, 4x32pdr upper deck, 24x32pdr main deck (1847), 4x32pdr main deck (1857)	1845; 1846; 1846; 1847	1847; 1896; 1903 breaking up at Ereğli.
Taif (Ta'if)	Tersâne-i Âmire, Istanbul, Constantinople; LOA 69.1m, B 11.7m, D 5.1m 1443t BM, Wood; 9kts 320	Steam, side paddle 2, 150t coal 1 direct action 2 cyl., 900ihp, Maudslay, Sons & Field; 2xlong 10 inch iron Paixhan guns on traversing carriages on upper deck, 4x32pdr upper deck, 24x32pdr main deck (1847), 12x32pdr main deck (1857)	1845; 1846; 1847; 1847	1847; 1867; 1868 breaking up at Tersâne-i Âmire, Istanbul.
Saik-i Şadi ("Sender of Happiness")	Tersâne-i Âmire, Istanbul, Constantinople; LOA 69.1m, B 11.7m, D 5.1m 1448t BM, Wood; 9kts 320	Steam, side paddle 2, 150t coal 1 direct action 2 cyl., 900ihp, Maudslay, Sons & Field; 2xlong 10 inch iron Paixhan guns on traversing carriages on upper deck, 4x32pdr upper deck, 24x32pdr main deck (1847), 12x32pdr main deck (1857)	1845; 1846; 1847; 1847	1847; 1867; 1869 breaking up at Tersâne-i Âmire, Istanbul.
Feyzâ-i Bahrî ("Abundance of the Sea")	Tersâne-i Âmire, Istanbul, Constantinople; LOA 69.1m, B 11.7m, D 5.1m 1443t BM, Wood; 9kts 320	Steam, side paddle 2, 150t coal 1 direct action 2 cyl., 900ihp, Maudslay, Sons & Field; 2xlong 10 inch iron Paixhan guns on traversing carriages on upper deck, 4x32pdr upper deck, 24x32pdr main deck (1847), 12x32pdr main deck (1857), Disarmed (1867)	1845; 1846; 1848; 1848	1848; 1878; 1880 breaking up at Istanbul.

==== Muhbir-i Sürûr (screw frigate) ====
Name (Namesake)	Builder Dimensions Displacement, Hull Speed Complement	Machinery Boiler, Bunkers Engines Armament	Ordered Laid down Launched Trials	Commissioned Decommissioned Afterward
Mubir-i Sürur ("Informer of thrones")	Tersâne-i Âmire, Iskenderiye, Alexandria; LOA 69.5m, LPP 67.1m, B 12.0m, D 5.0m 1477t BM, Wood; 10kts 350	Steam, 1 lifting screw 2, 200t coal 1 horizontal 2cyl., 900ihp, Miller & Ravenhill; 22x60pdr (1850), 2x65mm QF K (1892)	1846; 1846; 1847; 1848	1848 (Egypt Sarkiye); 1849 presented by Abbas I to Abdülmecid I. 1850 Ottoman Navy Muhbir-i Sürur. 1899 decommissioned 1904 sold for breaking up.

==== Kervan-i Bahri (steam frigate) ====
Name (Namesake)	Builder Dimensions Displacement, Hull Speed Complement	Machinery Boiler, Bunkers Engines Armament	Ordered Laid down Launched Trials	Commissioned Decommissioned Afterward
Kervan-i Bahri ("Caravan of the Sea")	Tersâne-i Âmire, Istanbul, Constantinople; LPP 63.1m, B 15.1m, D 6.9m 1592t, Wood; 9kts 275	Steam, 1 shaft 2 box type, 250t coal 1 set direct action 2cyl., R Naipier; 42xguns (1857), 2xguns (1868)	1852; 1852; 1853; 1857	1856; 1875; 1878 breaking up at Tersâne-i Âmire, Istanbul.

==== Ertuğrul (steam frigate) ====
Name (Namesake)	Builder Dimensions Displacement, Hull Speed Complement	Machinery Boiler, Bunkers Engines Armament	Ordered Laid down Launched Trials	Commissioned Decommissioned Afterward
Ertuğrul (Ertuğrul)	Tersâne-i Âmire, Istanbul, Constantinople; LPP 76.2m, B 15.1m, D 7.1m 2344t BM, Wood; 10kts 400	Steam, 1 shaft 2, 350t coal 1 set direct acting 2 cyl., 2200ihp, Ravenhill, Salkeld; 30x60pdr, 10x30pdr (1864), 1x203mm BL A, 30x60pdr, 10x30pdr (1876), 8x150mm BL K, 5x150mm BL A, 4x60mm K, 2x47mm RV H, 2x24.5mm N, 1xTT 455mm (WH)	1854; 1855; 1863; 1865	1864; 1888 sea cadet training ship 13 Sep 1890 sunk by heavy weather off Kii Ōshima, Higashimuro District. 584 lives lost.

==== Hüdâvendigâr class (screw frigate) ====
Name (Namesake)	Builder Dimensions Displacement, Hull Speed Complement	Machinery Boiler, Bunkers Engines Armament	Ordered Laid down Launched Trials	Commissioned Decommissioned Afterward
Hüdavendigâr (Murad I)	Tersâne-i Âmire, İzmit, İzmit; LPP 75.2m, B 15.2m, D 7.1m 2897t BM, Wood; 10kts 580	Steam, 1 shaft 2 box type, 325t coal 1 set direct acting 2cyl., 2770ihp 16x60pdr upper deck, 20x32pdr main deck (1865), Disarmed (1882)	1856; 1858; Oct. 1860; 1864	1864; 1882 exercise vessel for Fethiye. 1890 decommissioned Nov. 1909 sold for breaking up.
Nâsr-ül Azîz ("Holy Helper")	Tersâne-i Âmire, Gemlik, Gemlik; LPP 75.2m, B 15.2m, D 7.1m 2897t BM, Wood; 10kts 580	Steam, 1 shaft 2 box type, 325t coal 1 set direct acting 2cyl., 2770ihp 16x60pdr upper deck, 20x32pdr main deck (1865)	1856; 1858; 1861; 1865	1865; 22 Dec 1876 lost in heavy weather on the way from Bar to Alexandria at Pakus Island.

==== Selimiye (steam frigate) ====
Name (Namesake)	Builder Dimensions Displacement, Hull Speed Complement	Machinery Boiler, Bunkers Engines Armament	Ordered Laid down Launched Trials	Commissioned Decommissioned Afterward
Selimiye (Selim III)	Tersâne-i Âmire, Istanbul, Constantinople; LPP 105.3m, B 17.9m, D 7.1m 6422t, Wood; 10kts 580	- 2, 350t coal 1 set horizontal 2cyl., 2600ihp, Tersâne-i Âmire; 20x30pdr upper deck, 34x40pdr main deck (1870), 1x203mm ML A, 54x30pdr (1876), 2x203mm ML A, 6x150mm ML A, 3x57mm QF H, 2x25mm N (1879), 2x203mm ML A, 2x120mm ML A, 2x150mm K, 2x57mm QF H, 3x24mm N	1865; 1866; 1869; 1870	1870; 1879 stationary gunnery-training ship 1909 decommissioned 1911 sold for breaking up.

==== Peyk-i Meserret class (screw frigate) ====
Name (Namesake)	Builder Dimensions Displacement, Hull Speed Complement	Machinery Boiler, Bunkers Engines Armament	Ordered Laid down Launched Trials	Commissioned Decommissioned Afterward
Peyk-i Meserret ("Satellite of Joy")	Tersâne-i Âmire, Sinop, Sinop; LPP 68.5m, B 11.2m, D 52m 3132t BM, Wood; 250	Steam, 1 shaft 2 boc type, Tersâne-i Âmire, - 1–2 cyl. compound, vertical, 1800ihp, Tersâne-i Âmire; 2x100mm (1876), Disarmed (1877)	1868; 1872; 1874; 1876	1876; 1877 collier 16 Sep 1889 sunk in heavy weather off Kefken Island. 16 officers and 89 ratings lost.
Peyk-i Nusret ("Satellite of God's help")	Tersâne-i Âmire, Sinop, Sinop; LPP 68.5m, B 11.2m, D 52m 3132t BM, Wood; 250	Steam, 1 shaft 2 boc type, Tersâne-i Âmire, - 1–2 cyl. compound, vertical, 1800ihp, Tersâne-i Âmire; 2x100mm, Disarmed (1886)	1865 as Mukaddeme-i Nusret; 1872; 1875; 1877	1877 as Peyk-i Nusret; 1877 collier 1885 laid up at Istanbul used as stationary coal depot. 1904 decommissioned.
Mukaddeme-i Şeref ("Honored introduction")	Tersâne-i Âmire, Gemlik, Gemlik; LPP 68.5m, B 11.2m, D 52m 3132t BM, Wood; 250	Steam, 1 shaft 2 boc type, Tersâne-i Âmire, - 1–2 cyl. compound, vertical, 1800ihp, Tersâne-i Âmire; 2x100mm, Disarmed (1879), 4x47mm QF H (1892)	1868; 1873; 1875; 1876	1876; 1879 collier 1890 laid up at Smyrna used as stationary coal depot. 1904 decommissioned.
Rehber-i Tevfik ("Guidance of God's favour")	Tersâne-i Âmire, Suda, Suda; LPP 68.5m, B 11.2m, D 52m 3132t BM, Wood; 250	Steam, 1 shaft 2 boc type, Tersâne-i Âmire, - 1–2 cyl. compound, vertical, 1800ihp, Tersâne-i Âmire; 2x100mm	1868; 1873; 1879; 1880	1880; 1882 stationary torpedo training ship at Istanbul. 1895 engine and boilers removed, fitted in Medar-i Tevfik; 1896 floating storehouse for Tersâne-i Âmire, Istanbul; 1904 decommissioned.

==== Mehmed Selîm (steam frigate) ====
Name (Namesake)	Builder Dimensions Displacement, Hull Speed Complement	Machinery Boiler, Bunkers Engines Armament	Ordered Laid down Launched Trials	Commissioned Decommissioned Afterward
Mehmed Selîm (Mehmed Selim Efendi)	Tersâne-i Âmire, İzmit, İzmit; LPP 59.9m, B 10.0m, 6.4m 120t 12kts 275	Steam, 1 shaft 2, 250t coal 1–2 cyl. compound vertical, 1800ihp, Tersâne-i Âmire; 10x150mm K, 4x37mm QF, 4x25mm/4barrelled N (1880), 10x150mm K, 4x57 QF K, 4x37mm (1895), 1x47mm QF (1900)	1874; 1877; 14 Aug 1879; 1880	1880; 1889 laid up in poor condition 1895 stationary staining ship 1900 stationary torpedo school ship 1907 decommissioned, barrack vessel at Istanbul; 1923 sold for breaking up.

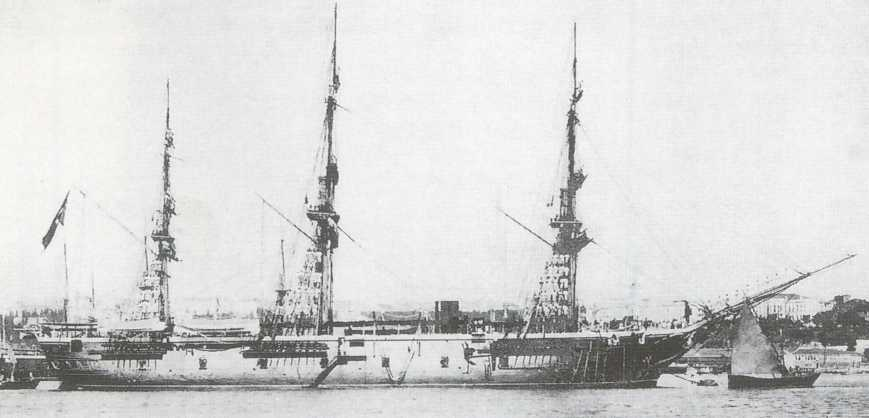
Ertuğrul

=== Corvette (Korvet) ===
==== Eser-i Cedîd (paddle corvette) ====
Name (Namesake)	Builder Dimensions Displacement, Hull Speed Complement	Machinery Boiler, Bunkers Engines Armament	Ordered Laid down Launched Trials	Commissioned Decommissioned Afterward
Eser-i Cedîd ("Innovation")	Tersâne-i Âmire, Istanbul, Constantinople; LPP 61.3m, B 11.4m, D 4.4m 1018t BM /814t N, Wood; 120	Steam, sidepaddle 2, 250t coal 1–2 cyl. compound vertical, 1800ihp, Tersâne-i Âmire, Istanbul; 10x150mm K, 4x37mm QF, 4x25.4mm/4-barrelled N (1880), 10x150mm K, 4x57mm QF K, 4x37mm (1900), 1x47mm QF	1840; 1841; 19 May 1841; 1842	1842; 1860 transport 1884 collier 1889 decommissioned 1894 sold for breaking up.

==== Sinop class (screw corvette) ====
Name (Namesake)	Builder Dimensions Displacement, Hull Speed Complement	Machinery Boiler, Bunkers Engines Armament	Ordered Laid down Launched Trials	Commissioned Decommissioned Afterward
Sinop (Sinop)	J & R White, Southampton; LPP 53.2m, B 9.3m, D 4.5m 780t BM, Wood, copper-sheathed 10kts 150	Steam, 1 shift 2 box type, 120t coal 1 set single acting, 1 cyl., 640ihp, Humphreys, Tennant & Dykes; 16x33pdr (1859), 2x150mm BL L/25 K, 2x120mm BL L/25 K, 3x37mm QF, 2x25mm N (1885), 3x50mm L/22 K, 3x37mm QF K	1857; 1858; 1858; 1859	1860; 1901
İzmir (İzmir)	J & R White, Southampton	Steam, 1 shift 2 box type, 120t coal 1 set single acting, 1 cyl., 640ihp, Humphreys, Tennant & Dykes; 16x33pdr (1859)	1857; 1858; 1859; 1859	1860; 1901
Bursa (Bursa)	Money Wigram, Blackwall, London	Steam, 1 shift 2 box type, 120t coal 1 set single acting, 1 cyl., 650ihp, Maudslay, Sons & Field; 16x33pdr (1859), 2x150mm BL L/25 K, 2x120mm BL L/25 K, 3x37mm QF, 2x25mm N (1885)	1857; 1858; 1859; 1859	1859; 1899
Edirne (Edirne)	Money Wigram, Blackwall, London	Steam, 1 shift 2 box type, 120t coal 1 set single acting, 1 cyl., 640ihp, Humphreys, Tennant & Dykes; 16x33pdr (1859), 2x150mm BL L/25 K, 2x120mm BL L/25 K, 3x37mm QF, 2x25mm N (1885)	1857; 1858; 1859; 1859	1859; 1901

==== Beyrût class (screw corvette) ====
Name (Namesake)	Builder Dimensions Displacement, Hull Speed Complement	Machinery Boiler, Bunkers Engines Armament	Ordered Laid down Launched Trials	Commissioned Decommissioned Afterward
Beyrût (Beirut)	Money Wigram, Thames; LPP 52.8m, B 8.0m, D 3.9m 609t BM / 599t N, Wood, copper sheathed 10kts 120	Steam, 1 shaft 2 box type, 120t coal 1x2cyl., 450ihp, Maudslay, Sons & Field; 12x33pdr (1860), 2x120 BL L/25 K, 4x37mm QF (1880), 2x120mm BL L/25 K, 2x37mm QF, 2x25mm N (1903)	1857; 1858; 1859; 1859	1860; 1907 decommissioned at Basra. 1907 breaking up.
Sedd-ül Bahir (Hellespont)	J & R White, Southampton; LPP 52.8m, B 8.0m, D 3.9m 609t BM / 599t N, Wood, copper sheathed 10kts 120	Steam, 1 shaft 2 box type, 120t coal 1x2cyl., 450ihp, Maudslay, Sons & Field; 12x33pdr (1860), 2x120 BL L/25 K, 4x37mm QF (1880)	1857; 1858; 1859; 1859	1860; 1891 decommissioned 1902 dismantled hull broken up.
İskenderiye (Alexandria)	Tersâne-i Âmire, Istanbul, Constantinople; LPP 52.8m, B 8.0m, D 3.9m 609t BM / 599t N, Wood, copper sheathed 10kts 120	Steam, 1 shaft 2 box type, 120t coal 1x2cyl., 450ihp, Humphrys, Tennant & Dyke; 12x33pdr (1860), 1x45pdr, 2x11pdr (1863), 12x33pdr (1860), 1x45pdr, 2x11pdr, 4xRV (1869), 2x120mm BL L/25 K, 2x76mm, 2-25mm N (1879), 2x120mm BL L/25 K, 2x37mm QF (1903)	1860; 1860 as Hüdâvendigâr; 1862; 1863	1863; 1907
Zuhâf (Zouave)	Tersâne-i Âmire, Istanbul, Constantinople; LPP 52.8m, B 8.0m, D 3.9m 609t BM / 599t N, Wood, copper sheathed 10kts 120	Steam, 1 shaft 2 box type, 120t coal 1x2cyl., 450ihp, Humphrys, Tennant & Dyke; 12x33pdr (1860), 1x45pdr, 2x11pdr (1863), 12x33pdr (1860), 1x45pdr, 2x11pdr, 4xRV (1869), 2x120mm BL L/25 K, 2x76mm, 2-25mm N (1879)	1860; 1861; 1862; 1863	1863; 1891; 1902 broken up.
Utarit (Mercury)	Tersâne-i Âmire, Gemlik, Gemlik; LPP 52.8m, B 8.0m, D 3.9m 609t BM / 599t N, Wood, copper sheathed 10kts 120	Steam, 1 shaft 2 box type, 120t coal 1x2cyl., 450ihp, Humphrys, Tennant & Dyke; 12x33pdr (1860), 1x45pdr, 2x11pdr (1863), 12x33pdr (1860), 1x45pdr, 2x11pdr, 4xRV (1869), 2x120mm BL L/25 K, 2x76mm, 2-25mm N (1879)	1860; 1862; 1863; 1864	1864; 1896; 1897 stationary at Kandilli. 1905 broken up at Kandilli.
Meriç (Maritsa)	Tersâne-i Âmire, Gemlik, Gemlik; LPP 52.8m, B 8.0m, D 3.9m 609t BM / 599t N, Wood, copper sheathed 10kts 120	Steam, 1 shaft 2 box type, 120t coal 1x2cyl., 450ihp, Humphrys, Tennant & Dyke; 12x33pdr (1860), 1x45pdr, 2x11pdr (1863), 12x33pdr (1860), 1x45pdr, 2x11pdr, 4xRV (1869), 2x120mm BL L/25 K, 2x76mm, 2-25mm N (1879), 2x120mm BL L/25 K, 2x37mm QF (1903)	1860; 1862; 1863; 1864	1864; 1905; 1909 sold for breaking up.

==== Mansûre class (screw corvette) ====
Name (Namesake)	Builder Dimensions Displacement, Hull Speed Complement	Machinery Boiler, Bunkers Engines Armament	Ordered Laid down Launched Trials	Commissioned Decommissioned Afterward
Mansûre (Mansoura)	Tersâne-i Âmire, Istanbul, Constantinople; LOA 53.1m, LPP 52.6m, B 9.3m, D 4.4m 783t BM, Wood, copper sheathed 10kts 130	Steam, 1 shaft 2 box type, Tersâne-i Âmire, 120t coal 1 set 2 cyl., 650ihp, Maudslay, Sons & Field; 12x37pdr (1864), 2x150mm L/22 BL K, 2x120mm BL L/25, 3x37mm QF, 2x25mm N (1888)	1861; 1863; 1864; 1864	1864; 1908; 13 Aug 1910 sunk in the Golden Horn in heavy weather. 1911 salvaged and broken up. çıkarılıp parçalandı.
Lübnan (Lebanon)	Tersâne-i Âmire, Istanbul, Constantinople; LOA 53.1m, LPP 52.6m, B 9.3m, D 4.4m 783t BM, Wood, copper sheathed 10kts 130	Steam, 1 shaft 2 box type, Tersâne-i Âmire, 120t coal 1 set 2 cyl., 650ihp, Maudslay, Sons & Field; 12x37pdr (1864)	1861; 1862; 1864; 1864	1864; Apr. 1867 sunk off Milo Island in heavy weather.
Muzaffer ("Triumphant")	Tersâne-i Âmire, İzmit, İzmit; LOA 53.1m, LPP 52.6m, B 9.3m, D 4.4m 783t BM, Wood, copper sheathed 10kts 130	Steam, 1 shaft 2 box type, Tersâne-i Âmire, 120t coal 1 set 2 cyl., 650ihp, Maudslay, Sons & Field; 12x37pdr (1864), 2x150mm L/22 BL K, 2x120mm BL L/25, 3x37mm QF, 2x25mm N (1888)	1861; 1863; 1864; 1865	1864; 1908; 1912 broken up at Istanbul.

==== Heybet Nümâ (corvette) ====
Name (Namesake)	Builder Dimensions Displacement, Hull Speed Complement	Machinery Boiler, Bunkers Engines Armament	Ordered Laid down Launched Trials	Commissioned Decommissioned Afterward
Heybet Nümâ ("Awe inspiring")	Tersâne-i Âmire, Istanbul, Constantinople; LPP 98.9m, B 9.7m, D 4.7m 1958t, Composite, sheathed and coppered 12kts 190	Steam, 1 shaft 6 cyl., Tersâne-i Âmire, 280t coal 1xVTE, 2786ihp, Tersâne-i Âmire, Istanbul; 1x150mm L/25 QF K, 6x120mm L/25 K, 6x47mm QF K (1895), 2x150mm BL L/25 K, 2x120mm BL L/25 K, 4x47mm QF K (1898)	1879; 1881; 30 Jan 1890; 1895	Apr. 1895; 1907; 31 Jul 1909 sold for breaking up. 1911 left Istanbul to İzmit, loaded with scrap copper. Sunk near Yalova.

==== Zuhâf class (corvette) ====
Name (Namesake)	Builder Dimensions Displacement, Hull Speed Complement	Machinery Boiler, Bunkers Engines Armament	Ordered Laid down Launched Trials	Commissioned Decommissioned Afterward
Zuhâf (Zouave)	Tersâne-i Âmire, Istanbul, Constantinople; Germania AG, Kiel Yr No 60; LPP 57.9m, B 7.3m, D 3.5m 643t, Steel; 10kts (1904); 82	Steam, 1 shaft 2 cyl., Tersâne-i Âmire, Istanbul, 80t coal 1xVTE, 640ihp, Tersâne-i Âmire, Istanbul; 1x120mm L/25 BL K, 4x37mm QF H, Disarmed (1916)	1890; 1892; 31 Aug 1894; 1896	Oct. 1896; May 1915 reserve vessel 1916 laid up 1917 survey vessel Oct 1918 laid up at Istanbul; 1924 sailed for Gölcük, laid up 1932 decommissioned 1936 broken up at Gölcük.
Kilid Bahir (Kilitbahir)	Tersâne-i Âmire, Istanbul, Constantinople; Germania AG, Kiel Yd No 61; LPP 57.9m, B 7.3m, D 3.5m 643t, Steel; 10kts (1904); 82	Steam, 1 shaft 2 cyl., Tersâne-i Âmire, Istanbul, 80t coal 1xVTE, 640ihp, Tersâne-i Âmire, Istanbul; 1x120mm L/25 BL K, 4x37mm QF H	1890; 1892; 31 Aug 1894; 1896	Oct. 1896; 1909 decommissioned, laid up at Basra; Aug. 1914 sunk as block ship off Basra.

== Armoured warships ==
=== Armoured frigate (Zırhlı fırkateyn) ===
==== Osmaniye class (broadside ironclad) ====
Name (Namesake)	Builder Dimensions Displacement, Hull Speed Complement	Machinery Boiler, Bunkers Engines Armament	Ordered Laid down Launched Trials	Commissioned Decommissioned Afterward
Osmaniye (Osman I)	R. Napier & Son, Glasgow Yd No 255; LOA 91.4m, LPP 89.3m, B 16.9m, D 7.9m 4221t BOM (1865) / 6400t (1896), Iron; 6kts (1891) / 10 kts (1895); 26 officers, 335 ratings (1865)	Steam 1 shaft, 2 shaft (1894); 6 box type R Naipier (1865), 750t coal (1864); 1 horizontal direct acting, R Naipier (1865), 2xVTE, 3735ihp, Ansaldo (1894); 1x229mm MLR A, 14x203mm MLR A, 10x36pdr A (1865); 1x229mm MLR A, 14x203mm MLR A, 4x47mm QF H, 2x25.4mm 4 barrelled N (1884); 2x240mm L/35 BL K, 8x150mm L/25 BL K, 5x105mm L/25 BL K, 2x47mm QF, 7x25.4mm 4 barrelled N (1894)	1862; Mar. 1863; 2 Sep 1864 (Gazi Osman); 27 Jun 1865	Nov. 1865 (Osmâniye); 31 Jul 1909; 1923 sold for breaking up.
Aziziye (Abdülaziz)	R. Napier & Son, Glasgow Yd No 256; LOA 91.4m, LPP 89.3m, B 16.9m, D 7.9m 4221t BOM / 6400t, Iron; 6kts (1891) / 10 kts (1895); 26 officers, 335 ratings (1865)	Steam 1 shaft, 2 shaft (1894); 6 box type R Naipier (1865), 750t coal (1864); 1 horizontal direct acting, R Naipier; 1x229mm MLR A, 14x203mm MLR A, 10x36pdr A (1865); 1x229mm MLR A, 14x203mm MLR A, 4x47mm QF H, 2x25.4mm 4 barrelled N (1884); 2x240mm L/35 BL K, 8x150mm L/25 BL K, 5x105mm L/25 BL K, 2x47mm QF, 7x25.4mm 4 barrelled N (1894)	1862; May 1863; Dec. 1864 (Abdül Aziz); 1865	Aug. 1865 (Azîziye); 31 Jul 1909; 1923 sold for breaking up.
Orhaniye (Orhan I)	R. Napier & Son, Glasgow Yd No 257; LOA 91.4m, LPP 89.3m, B 16.9m, D 7.9m 4221t BOM / 6400t, Iron; 6kts (1891) / 10 kts (1895); 26 officers, 335 ratings (1865)	Steam 1 shaft, 2 shaft (1894); 6 box type R Naipier (1865), 750t coal (1864); 1 horizontal direct acting, R Naipier; 1x229mm MLR A, 14x203mm MLR A, 10x36pdr A (1865); 1x229mm MLR A, 14x203mm MLR A, 4x47mm QF H, 2x25.4mm 4 barrelled N (1884); 2x240mm L/35 BL K, 8x150mm L/25 BL K, 5x105mm L/25 BL K, 2x47mm QF, 7x25.4mm 4 barrelled N (1894)	1862; 1863; 26 Jun 1865; 1866	1866; 31 Jul 1909; 1913 sold for breaking up.
Mahmudiye (Mahmud II)	Thames Iron Works, Blackwall, London Yd No 99e LOA 91.4m, LPP 89.3m, B 16.9m, D 7.9m 4221t BOM / 6400t, Iron; 6kts (1891) / 12,5 kts (1895); 26 officers, 335 ratings (1865)	Steam 1 shaft, 2 shaft (1894); 6 box type R Naipier (1865), 750t coal (1864); 1 horizontal direct acting, Ravenhill, Salkeld; 1x229mm MLR A, 14x203mm MLR A, 10x36pdr A (1865); 1x229mm MLR A, 14x203mm MLR A, 4x47mm QF H, 2x25.4mm 4 barrelled N (1884); 2x240mm L/35 BL K, 8x150mm L/25 BL K, 5x105mm L/25 BL K, 2x47mm QF, 7x25.4mm 4 barrelled N (1894)	1863; 1864; 13 Dec 1864; 1865	1866; 31 Jul 1909; 1913 sold for breaking up.

==== Fâtih (broadside ironclad) ====
Name (Namesake)	Builder Dimensions Displacement, Hull Speed Complement	Machinery Boiler, Bunkers Engines Armament	Ordered Laid down Launched Trials	Commissioned Decommissioned Afterward
Fâtih (Mehmed II)	Thames Iron Works, Blackwall, London Yd No 30f LOA 112.2m, B 18.3m, D 8.5m 6127t BOM / 10.761t, Iron; 14kts 1200	Steam 1 shaft 8 box type J Penn, 750t coal 1 horizontal single expansion 2 cyl, 8344ihp, Maudslay; 33x72pdr A, 1x240mm ML A, 5x210mm ML A	1864; Mar. 1864; 25 Apr 1868; 1868	6 Feb 1867 purchased by Prussia; 20 Feb 1869 (SMS König Wilhelm); 3 May 1904 harbour service 4 Jan 1921 sold for breaking up.

==== Fettâh (broadside ironclad) ====
Name (Namesake)	Builder Dimensions Displacement, Hull Speed Complement	Machinery Boiler, Bunkers Engines Armament	Ordered Laid down Launched Trials	Commissioned Decommissioned Afterward
Fettâh ("Conqueror")	Tersâne-i Âmire, Istanbul, Constantinople; LOA 91,4m, LPP 89,3m, B 16,9m, D 7,9m 4221t (BOM) / 6400t, Iron; 12kts 400	Steam 1 shaft 6 box type, Tersâne-i Âmire, 750t coal 1 horizontal direct acting, Tersâne-i Âmire; 1x229mm MLR A, 14x203mm MLR A, 10x36pdr A	1864; 23 Apr 1865 cancelled. - -	- - - -

==== Mesûdiye (central battery ironclad) ====
Name (Namesake)	Builder Dimensions Displacement, Hull Speed Complement	Machinery Boiler, Bunkers Engines Armament	Ordered Laid down Launched Trials	Commissioned Decommissioned Afterward
Mesûdiye ("Happiness")	Thames Iron Works, Blackwall, London Yd No 80f LOA 102.4m, B 17.9m, D 7.9m 8938t (1873), 9190t (1903), Iron; 10kts (1884), 17kts (1903); 1200 (1873), 800 (1903), 665 (1914)	Steam 1 shaft, 2 shaft (1903); 8 rectangular, Thames Iron Work (1873), 16 Niclausse water-tube, Ansaldo (1903), 600t coal 1 horizontal single expansion 2 cyl, 7431ihp, Thames Iron Works (1873), 2 triple expansion 4 cyl, 11,135ihp, Ansaldo (1903); 12x254mm MLR A, 3x178mm MLR A (1873), 12x254mm MLR A, 3x178mm MLR A, 6x76 QF K, 6x25.4mm H (1891), 2x234mm MLR L/40 BL V, 12x152mm L/45 QF V, 14x76mm QF K, 2x47mm QF, 10x57mm QF (1903), 12x152mm L/45 QF V, 14x76mm QF V, 2x47mm QF (1914)	1871; 1872; 28 Oct 1874; 1875	Dec. 1875; 5 Sep 1914; Sep. 1914 floating battery off Çanakkale. 13 Dec 1914 sunk by torpedo attack of British submarine HMS B11 near Erenköy.

==== Mahmûdiye (central battery ironclad) ====
Name (Namesake)	Builder Dimensions Displacement, Hull Speed Complement	Machinery Boiler, Bunkers Engines Armament	Ordered Laid down Launched Trials	Commissioned Decommissioned Afterward
Mahmudiye (Mahmud II)	Thames Iron Works, Blackwall, London Yd No 99e LOA 102,4m, B 17,9m, D 7,9m 9120t, Iron; 13kts 1200	Steam 1 shaft 4, 600t coal 2 compound vertical, 6580ihp, Maudslay; 16x240mm ML A	1871; 1873; 16 Nov 1875 (Mahmûdiye); 15 Nov 1880	Feb. 1876 renamed Hamidiye; 20 Feb 1878 purchased by British government. 1880 (HMS Superb) - 15 May 1906 sold for breaking up.

==== Hamidiye (central battery ironclad) ====
Name (Namesake)	Builder Dimensions Displacement, Hull Speed Complement	Machinery Boiler, Bunkers Engines Armament	Ordered Laid down Launched Trials	Commissioned Decommissioned Afterward
Hamidiye (Abdülhamid II)	Sir W G Armstrong Whitworth & Co Ltd., Blackwall, London; LOA 89.0m, LPP 87.6m, B 16.9m, D 7.5m 6594t, Iron; 13kts 350	Steam 1 shift 4 box type, Tersâne-i Âmire, 600t coal 1 single expansion 2cyl, 6800ihp, Mauslay; 4x238mm ML A, 10x150mm L/35 BL K (1894)	1871; Dec. 1874; Feb. 1885; 1893 Intended name Nusretiye	1894 stationary training vessel for torpedo-boats 1903; 11 Nov 1909 offered for breaking up. 1913 sold for breaking up.

==== Peyk-i Şeref class (armoured ram) ====
Name (Namesake)	Builder Dimensions Displacement, Hull Speed Complement	Machinery Boiler, Bunkers Engines Armament	Ordered Laid down Launched Trials	Commissioned Decommissioned Afterward
Peyk-i Şeref ("Satellite of Glory")	Samuda & Son, London; LPP 74,6m, B 15,8m, D 6,4m 4870t, Iron; 12kts 250	Steam 1 shaft 4, - 1 horizontal direct acting, 4040ihp, Maudslay; 4x305mm ML, 4x20pdr, 2xTT 335mm	1874; 1874; 12 Feb 1876; 1878	19 Jul 1878 purchased by British government. 19 Jul 1878 (HMS Belleisle); 1904 sold for breaking up.
Burc-ı Zafer ("Fortress of Victory")	Samuda & Son, London; LPP 74,6m, B 15,8m, D 6,4m 4870t, Iron; 12kts 250	Steam 1 shaft 4, - 1 horizontal direct acting, 4040ihp, Maudslay; 4x305mm ML, 4x20pdr, 2xTT 335mm	1874; 1875; 23 Jan 1878; 1881	13 Feb 1878 purchased by British government. 13 Jul 1882 (HMS Orion); 1913 sold for breaking up.

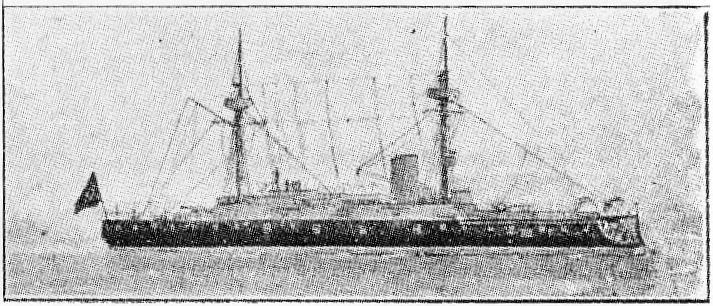
Osmâniye

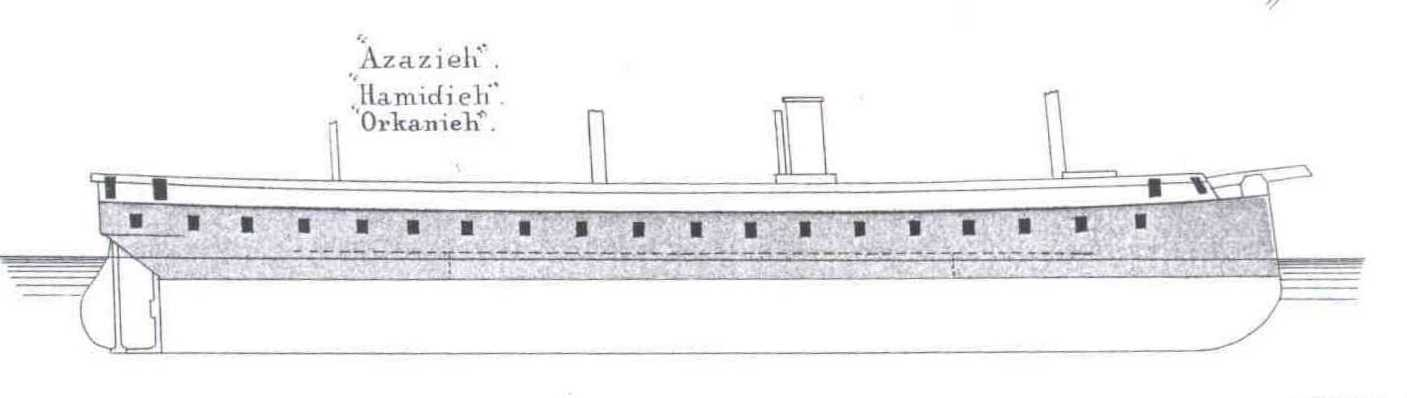
Orhâniye

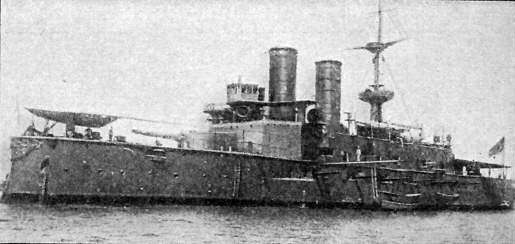
Mesûdiye

=== Armoured corvette (Zırhlı korvet) ===
==== Asar-ı Tevfik (barbette battery ironclad) ====
Name (Namesake)	Builder Dimensions Displacement, Hull Speed Complement	Machinery Boiler, Bunkers Engines Armament	Ordered Laid down Launched Trials	Commissioned Decommissioned Afterward
Asar-i Tevfik ("Works of God's favour")	SA des Ferges et Chantiers de la Méditerranée, La Seyne; LPP 83.0m, 16.0m, D 6.5m 4687t, Iron; 8kts (1895), 15kts (1906), 9kts (1910); 450 (1870), 350 (1907)	Steam 1 shaft 6 box type, La Seyne, 6 Niclausse cyl., Germania, 400t coal 1 horizontal compound expansion, La Seyne; 8x220mm ML A (1870), 6x220mm ML A, 2-210mm BK K, 2x25.4mm N (1891), 3x150mm L/40 QF K, 6x57mm QF K, 2x34mm QF K (1906)	1865 (Egypt, Ibrahimiye); 1867; 1868; 29 Aug 1868 transferred to Ottoman Navy	1870; Flagship of Navy Minister Arif Hikmet Pasha. 11 Feb 1913 (25 Jan 1913) run aground on an uncharted sandbank while approaching to Podima (present day: Yalıköy, Çatalca).

==== Asar-ı Şevket class (barbette battery ironclad) ====
Name (Namesake)	Builder Dimensions Displacement, Hull Speed Complement	Machinery Boiler, Bunkers Engines Armament	Ordered Laid down Launched Trials	Commissioned Decommissioned Afterward
Asar-i Şevket ("Works of God's greatness")	SA des Forges et Chantiers de la Méditerranée, La Seyne Yd No 364; LOA 61.9m, LPP 64.4m, B 12.9m, D 5.0m 2583t (BOM) / 2047t, Iron; 8kts (1878); 170	Steam 1 shaft 4 box type, La Seyne, 4, Tersâne-i Âmire (1891), 300t coal 1 horizontal compound expansion, 1750ihp, La Sayne; 1x230mm ML A, 4x180mm ML A (1870), 1x230mm ML A, 4x180mm ML A, 2x87mm BL K, 2x63.5mm BL K, 2x37mm RV H, 1x25.4mm N	1887 (Egypt, Kahira); 1867; 1868; 29 Aug 1868 transferred to the Ottoman Navy	3 Mar 1870; 1903; 31 Jul 1909 offered for breaking up.
Necm-i Şevket ("Star of God's greatness")	SA des Forges et Chantiers de la Méditerranée, La Seyne Yd No 365; LOA 61.9m, LPP 64.4m, B 12.9m, D 5.0m 2583t (BOM) / 2047t, Iron; 8kts (1878); 170	Steam 1 shaft 4 box type, La Seyne, 4, Tersâne-i Âmire (1891), 300t coal 1 horizontal compound expansion, 1750ihp, La Sayne; 1x230mm ML A, 4x180mm ML A (1870), 1x230mm ML A, 4x180mm ML A, 2x87mm BL K, 2x63.5mm BL K, 2x37mm RV H, 1x25.4mm N	1865 (Egypt, Muzaffer); 1867; 1868; 29 Aug 1868 transferred to the Ottoman Navy; 1869	3 Mar 1870; 1929; 1899–1909 starionary ship at Salonika; 1909 barracks vessel at Constantinople

==== Lütf-i Celil class (coast defense turret ship) ====
Name (Namesake)	Builder Dimensions Displacement, Hull Speed Complement	Machinery Boiler, Bunkers Engines Armament	Ordered Laid down Launched Trials	Commissioned Decommissioned Afterward
Lütf-ü Celil ("Divine Grace")	SA des Chantiers et Atelier de la Gironde, Bordeaux; LOA 64.4m, LPP 62.1m, B 13.6m, D 4.4m 1741t (BOM) / 2540t, Iron; 10kts (1870); 12 officers, 110 ratings	Steam, 2 shaft 2 locomotive type, Chantiers ed Ateliers de la Gironde; 1 horizontan compound expansion 2cyl., 2000ihp, Chantiers ed Ateliers de la Gironde; 2x225mm ML A, 2x178mm ML A (1870), 2x225mm ML A, 2x178mm ML A, 1x120mm BL K (1875)	1867 (Egypt); 1868; 1869; 29 Aug 1868 transferred to the Ottoman Navy; 1870	Mar. 1870; 10 May 1877 sunk by Russian field guns off İriali (Danube).
Hifz-ur Rahman ("Merciful Protector")	SA des Chantiers et Atelier de la Gironde, Bordeaux; LOA 64.4m, LPP 62.1m, B 13.6m, D 4.4m 1741t (BOM) / 2540t, Iron; 10kts (1870); 12 officers, 110 ratings	Steam, 2 shaft 2 locomotive type, Chantiers ed Ateliers de la Gironde; 1 horizontan compound expansion 2cyl., 2000ihp, Chantiers ed Ateliers de la Gironde; 2x225mm ML A, 2x178mm ML A (1870), 2x225mm ML A, 2x178mm ML A, 1x120mm BL K (1875), 2x225mm ML A, 1x150mm BL K, 1x120mm BL K, 4x37mm QF H, 2x25.4nn RV N (1891)	1867 (Egypt); 1868; 1869; 29 Aug 1868 transferred to the Ottoman Navy; 1870	Mar. 1870; 1909; 11 Nov 1909 sold for breaking up.

==== Avnillah class (casemate ironclad) ====
Name (Namesake)	Builder Dimensions Displacement, Hull Speed Complement	Machinery Boiler, Bunkers Engines Armament	Ordered Laid down Launched Trials	Commissioned Decommissioned Afterward
Avnillah ("Divine Assistance")	Thames Iron Works, Blackwall, London Yd No 44f LOA 71.9m, LPP 68.9m B 10.9m, D 5.0mm 1399t (BOM) / 2362t, Iron; 10kts (1877), 8kts (1892); 15 officer, 130 ratings (1870), 200 (1906)	Steam 1, 1 shaft, 2 shaft (1906); 4 box type, Thames Iron Works (1870), 2 cyl. water-tube type, Tersâne-i Âmire (1906), 220t coal 1 horizontal compound expansion, 2200ihp, Maudslay; 4x230mm ML A (1870), 4x150mm L/40 QF K, 6x75mm QF K, 10x57mm QF K, 2x47mm QF K (1906), 4x57mm QF K (1910)	1867; 1868; 21 Apr 1869; 1870	1870; 24 Feb 1912 sunk by gunfire by Giuseppe Garibaldi and Varese during the Battle of Beirut in 1912.
Muin-i Zafer ("Aid to Victory")	Thames Iron Works, Blackwall, London; LOA 71.9m, LPP 68.9m B 10.9m, D 5.0m 1399t (BOM) / 2362t, Iron; 10kts (1877), 8kts (1892); 15 officer, 130 ratings (1870), 200 (1906)	Steam 1, 1 shaft, 2 shaft (1906); 4 box type, Thames Iron Works (1870), 2 cyl. water-tube type, Tersâne-i Âmire (1906), 220t coal 1 horizontal compound expansion, 2200ihp, Maudslay; 4x230mm ML A (1870), 4x150mm L/40 QF K, 6x75mm QF K, 10x57mm QF K, 2x47mm QF K (1906), 2x75mm QF K, 4x57mm QF K (1910), Disarmed (1913)	1867; 1868; Jun. 1869; 1870	1870; 1932; 1910 stationary ship at Smyrna; 1913 torpedo training vessel off Heybeliada; 1920 barrack vessel at İzmit; 1928 submarine depot ship at Erdek

==== Feth-i Bülend (casemate ironclad) ====
Name (Namesake)	Builder Dimensions Displacement, Hull Speed Complement	Machinery Boiler, Bunkers Engines Armament	Ordered Laid down Launched Trials	Commissioned Decommissioned Afterward
Feth-i Bülend ("Great Conquest")	Thames Iron Works, Blackwall, London Yd No 46f LPP 72.0m, B 11.9m, D 5.2m 1601t (BOM) / 2762, Iron; 10kts (1877), 8 kts (1892), 9 kts (1906), 7kts (1910); 16 officers, 153 ratings (1870), 220 (1906), 150 (1910)	Steam, 1 shaft 6 box type, Thames Iron Works (1870), 2 cyl. water-tube type, Tersâne-i Âmire (1906), 300t coal 4x222mm ML A (1870), 4x222mm ML A, 1x170mm ML A, 2x87mm BL K (1882), 4x222mm ML A, 2x87mm BL K, 2x63mm BL K, 2x37mm RV H, 1x25.4mm H (1890), 4x150mm L/40 QF K, 6x75mm QF K, 6x57mm QF K (1907), Disarmed (1911)	1867; May 1868; 1869; 1870	1870; 31 Oct 1912 sunk by torpedo by Greek torpedo boat No 11 with the loss of seven crew, including ship's imam.

==== Mukaddeme-i Hayir (casemate ironclad) ====
Name (Namesake)	Builder Dimensions Displacement, Hull Speed Complement	Machinery Boiler, Bunkers Engines Armament	Ordered Laid down Launched Trials	Commissioned Decommissioned Afterward
Mukaddeme-i Hayir ("Good Introduction")	Tersâne-i Âmire, Istanbul, Constantinople; Feth-i Bülend 'in yerli modeli LPP 72.0m, B 11.9m, D 5.2m 1601t (BOM) / 2762t, Iron; 8kts (1892); 16 officers, 153 ratings	Steam, 1 shaft 4 box type, Tersâne-i Âmire, 270t coal 1 horizontal compound expansion, 3250ihp, Tersâne-i Âmire; 4x222mm ML A (1874), 4x222mm ML A, 2x87mm BL K, 2x63.5mm BL K, 2x37mm RV H, 2x25.4mm N (1882)	1868; 1870; 28 Oct 1872; 1874	1874; Sep. 1923 the first armoured ship built in the Ottoman Empire; 1923 breaking up began at İzmit

==== Iclaliye (barbette battery ironclad) ====
Name (Namesake)	Builder Dimensions Displacement, Hull Speed Complement	Machinery Boiler, Bunkers Engines Armament	Ordered Laid down Launched Trials	Commissioned Decommissioned Afterward
Iclaliye ("Glorious")	SA Stabilimento Tecnico Triestino, San Rocco, Muggia Yd No 51; LOA 66.0m, LPP 63.6m B 12.8m, D 4.8m 1650t (BOM) / 2228t, 10kts (1877), 6kts (1896); 16 officers, 132 ratings (1871), 180 (1891)	Steam, 1 shaft 2 box type, Stabilimento Tecnico, 250t coal 1 horizontal compound expansion, 1800ihp, Stabilimento Tecnico; 3x178mm ML A, 2x228mm BL A (1871), 2x278mm BL K, 1x152mm L/22 BL K, 2x87mm BL K, 2x63.7mm BL K, 2x37mm RV, 2x25.4mm N (1885), Disarmed (1914)	May 1868 (Egypt); May 1868; 1869; 29 Aug 1868'de Osmanlı Bahriye'ye transfer.	Feb. 1871; 1928; Feb. 1914 barrack vessel for navy school at Heybeliada; Feb. 1919 stationary cadet training ship at Kasımpaşa; 1928 sold for breaking up at Gölcük

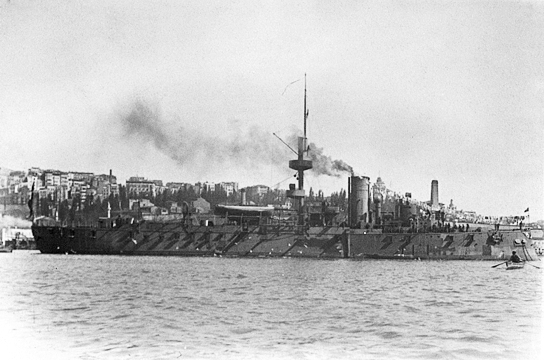
Âsâr-ı Tevfik

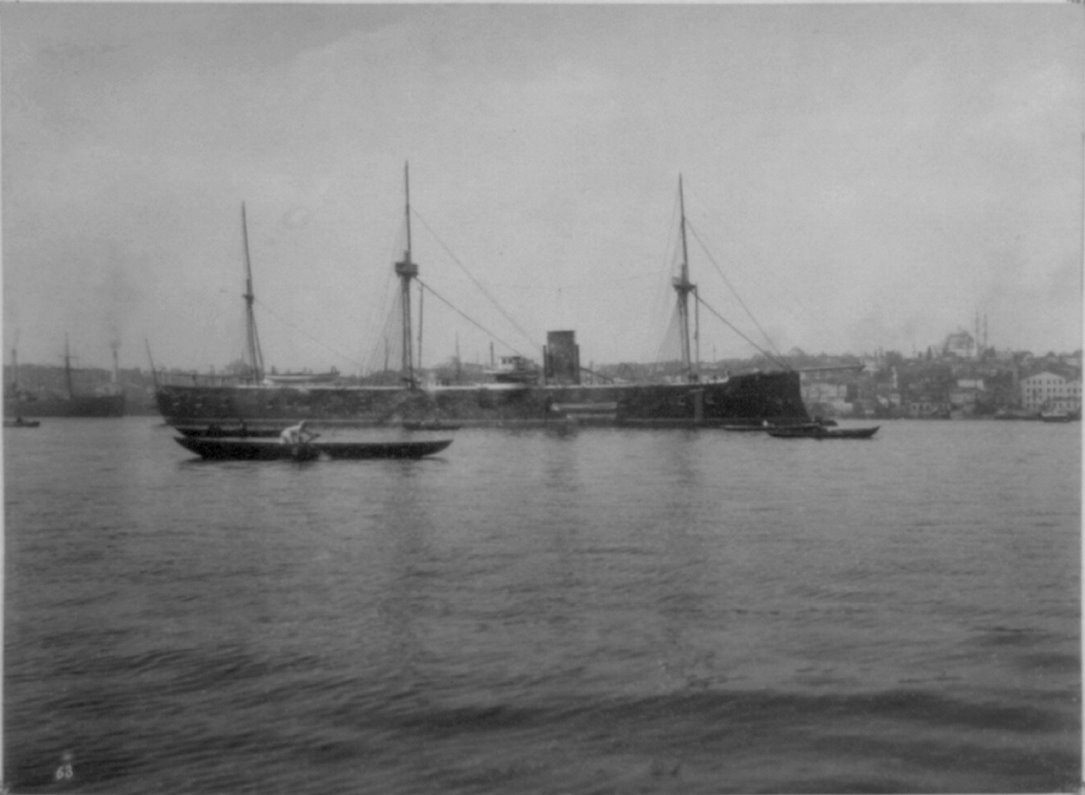
Âsâr-ı Şevket

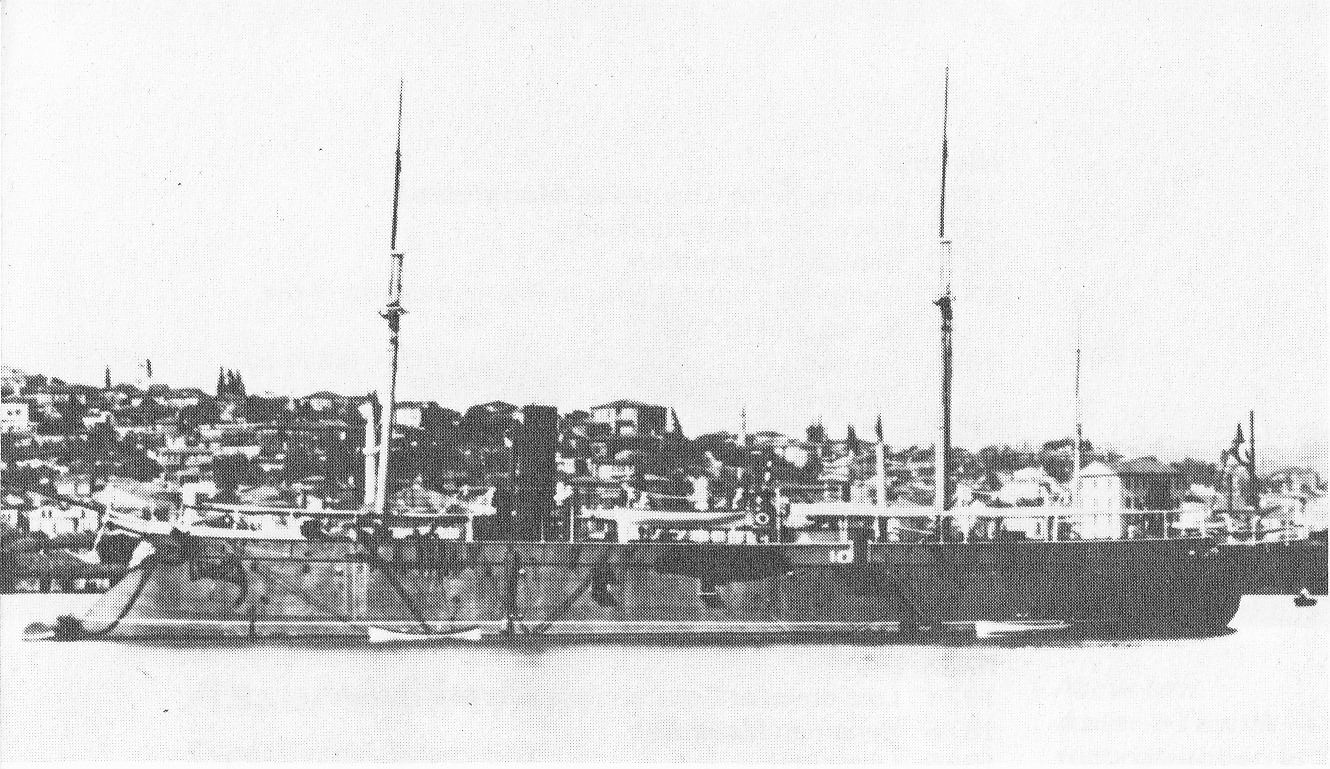
İclâliye

=== River monitor (Zırhlı Duba) ===
==== Feth-ül İslâm class ====
Name (Namesake)	Builder Dimensions Displacement, Hull Speed Complement	Machinery Boiler, Bunkers Engines Armament	Ordered Laid down Launched Trials	Commissioned Decommissioned Afterward
Feth-ül İslâm ("Conquer of Islam")	SA des Forges et Chantiers de la Méditerranée, La Seyne; LOA 31.5m, LPP 30.5m, B 9.8m, D 1.7m 335t, Iron; 8kts 50 (1865)	Steam, 1 shaft, 2 screws 2, La Seyne, 20t coal 2 high-pressurem 1cyl., 290ihp, La Seyne; 2x150mm ML A (1865), 2x150mm ML A, 6x76mm ML A (1871), 2x177mm K, 2x76mm K (1884), Disarmed (1901)	1863; 1864; 1864; 1865	1865 (Danube); 1878 laid up at Constantinople; 1908; 1909 sold for breaking up.
İşkodra (Shkodër)	SA des Forges et Chantiers de la Méditerranée, La Seyne; LOA 31.5m, LPP 30.5m, B 9.8m, D 1.7m 335t, Iron; 8kts 50 (1865)	Steam, 1 shaft, 2 screws 2, La Seyne, 20t coal 2 high-pressurem 1cyl., 290ihp, La Seyne; 2x150mm ML A (1865), 2x150mm ML A, 6x76mm ML A (1871)	1863; 1864; 1865; 1865	1865 (Lake Skadar); 1871 (Danube); 16 Jul 1877 captured by Russian forces 6 Oct 1877 Russian Imperial Navy Sistovo; 23 Nov 1889 stricken.
Böğürtlen (name of a kaza in Scutari Vilayet)	SA des Forges et Chantiers de la Méditerranée, La Seyne; LOA 31.5m, LPP 30.5m, B 9.8m, D 1.7m 335t, Iron; 8kts 50 (1865)	Steam, 1 shaft, 2 screws 2, La Seyne, 20t coal 2 high-pressurem 1cyl., 290ihp, La Seyne; 2x150mm ML A (1865), 2x150mm ML A, 6x76mm ML A (1871)	1863; 1864; 1865; 1865	1865 (Danube); 1878 laid up at Constantinople; 1880; 1886 sold for breaking up.
Podgoriçe (Podgorica)	SA des Forges et Chantiers de la Méditerranée, La Seyne; LOA 31.5m, LPP 30.5m, B 9.8m, D 1.7m 335t, Iron; 8kts 50 (1865)	Steam, 1 shaft, 2 screws 2, La Seyne, 20t coal 2 high-pressurem 1cyl., 290ihp, La Seyne; 2x150mm ML A (1865), 2x150mm ML A, 6x76mm ML A (1871)	1863; 1864; 1865; 1865	1865 (Danube); 17 Jun 1877 captured by Russian forces 6 Oct 1877 Russian Imperial Navy Nikopol; 23 Nov 1889 stricken.
Semendire/ Memdûhiye (Smederevo)	SA des Forges et Chantiers de la Méditerranée, La Seyne; LOA 31.5m, LPP 30.5m, B 9.8m, D 1.7m 335t, Iron; 8kts 50 (1865)	Steam, 1 shaft, 2 screws 2, La Seyne, 20t coal 2 high-pressurem 1cyl., 290ihp, La Seyne; 2x150mm ML A (1865), 2x150mm ML A, 6x76mm ML A (1871), 2x76mm K (1880)	1863; 1864; 1865; 1865	1865; 1878 laid up at Constantinople; 1879 renamed Memdûhiye; 1902; 1909 sold for breaking up.

==== Hizber class ====
Name (Namesake)	Builder Dimensions Displacement, Hull Speed Complement	Machinery Boiler, Bunkers Engines Armament	Ordered Laid down Launched Trials	Commissioned Decommissioned Afterward
Hizber ("Lion")	Tersâne-i Âmire, Istanbul, Constantinople; LPP 43.9m, B 9.4m, D 1.6m 513t (BOM) / 404t, Iron; 6kts (1886); 51 (1876), 38 (1886)	Steam, 1 shaft 1, Tersâne-i Âmire, 18t coal 1–2 cyl., 400ihp, Tersâne-i Âmire; 2x120mm ML K (1876), 2x120mm ML K, 2x76mm QF K, 2x34.5mm N (1886)	1870; 1872; Sep. 1873; 1876	1876; 1879 laid up at Constantinople; 1909; 1991 sold for breaking up.
Seyfî ("of Sword")	Tersâne-i Âmire, Istanbul, Constantinople; LPP 43.9m, B 9.4m, D 1.6m 513t (BOM) / 404t, Iron; 6kts (1886); 51 (1876)	Steam, 1 shaft 1, Tersâne-i Âmire, 18t coal 1–2 cyl., 400ihp, Tersâne-i Âmire; 2x120mm ML K (1876)	1870; 1872; Sep. 1873; 1876	1876; 26 May 1877 sunk by the Romanian torpedo boat Rândunica near Măcin

== Battleships ==
=== Abdül Kadir (battleship) ===
Name (Namesake)	Builder Dimensions Displacement, Hull Speed Complement	Machinery Boiler, Bunkers Engines Armament	Ordered Laid down Launched Trials	Commissioned Decommissioned Afterward
Abdül Kadir (Abdülhamid II)	Tersâne-i Âmire, Istanbul, Constantinople; L 103.6m, B 19.8m, D 7.1m 8100t, Steel; 18kts -	Steam, 2 shaft 6, Tersena-i Amire, 600t coal 2 VTE 3 cyl., 12.000ihp, Tersâne-i Âmire; 4x280mm K, 6x150mm K, 8x88mm QF K, 8x37mm QF K, 6xTT 533mm SK	1890; Oct. 1892; 1906 partly plated, work stopped 1909 slipway cleared.	- - - -

=== Turgut Reis class (battleship) ===
Name (Namesake)	Builder Dimensions Displacement, Hull Speed Complement	Machinery Boiler, Bunkers Engines Armament	Ordered Laid down Launched Trials	Commissioned Decommissioned Afterward
Turgut Reis (Turgut Reis)	AG Vulcan, Stettin Yd No 199; LOA 115.7m, LPP 113.9m, B 19.5m, D 7.6m 10.013t / 10.670 (full road), Steel; 10kts (1911); 600	Steam, 2 shaft 12, Vulcan, 1050t coal 2 triple expansion 3cyl., 10,110ihp, Vulcan; 4x280mm L/40 K, 2x280mm L/35 K, 6x105mm L/35 QF K, 8x88mm L/30 QF K, 12xMG, 4xTT 450mm SK (1910), 4x280mm L/40 K, 2x280mm L/35 K, 6x105mm L/35 QF K, 6x88mm L/30 QF K, 12xMG, 3xTT 450mm SK (1912), 4x280mm L/40 K, 2x280mm L/35 K, 6x88mm L/30 QF K, 12xMG, 3xTT 450mm SK (1916), 2x280mm L/40 K, 6x105mm L/35 QF K, 2x88mm L/30 QF K, 2xTT 450mm SK (1927)	1889 (Brandenburg-class battleship); 1890; 14 Dec 1891; 1893	5 Jun 1894 ( SMS Weissenburg); 31 Aug 1910 18:30 ( Turgut Reis); 1933; 1924–1933 stationary school ship at Gölcük; 1933 decommissioned, barrack vessel for dockyard workers 1950 breaking up began at Gölcük.
Barbaros Hayreddin (Hayreddin Barbarossa)	Kaiserliche Werft, Wilhelmshaven Yd No 13; LOA 115.7m, LPP 113.9m, B 19.5m, D 7.6m 10.013t / 10.670 (full road), Steel; 10kts (1911); 600	Steam, 2 shaft 12, Kaiserliche Werft, 1050t coal 2 triple expansion 3cyl., 10,110ihp, Kaiserliche Werft; 4x280mm L/40 K, 2x280mm L/35 K, 6x105mm L/35 QF K, 8x88mm L/30 QF K, 12xMG, 4xTT 450mm SK (1910), 4x280mm L/40 K, 2x280mm L/35 K, 6x105mm L/35 QF K, 6x88mm L/30 QF K, 12xMG, 3xTT 450mm SK (1912)	1889 (Brandenburg-class battleship); 30 Jun 1891; 1893	24 Apr 1894 ( SMS Kurfürst Friedrich Wilhelm); 31 Aug 1910 18:30 ( Barbaros Hayreddin); Sunk by British submarine HMS E11 in the Sea of Marmara. 253 lives lost.

=== Reşadiye class (battleship) ===
Name (Namesake)	Builder Dimensions Displacement, Hull Speed Complement	Machinery Boiler, Bunkers Engines Armament	Ordered Laid down Launched Trials	Commissioned Decommissioned Afterward
Reşadiye (Mehmed V)	Vickers Ltd., Barrow Yd No 425; LOA 170.5m, LPP 160.8m, B 27.9m, 8.5m 23,000t / 25,250t (full road), Steel; 21kts - Version of King George V-class battleship.	Steam turbines, 4 shafts 15, Babcock & Wilcox, - 4 turbines, 26,500shp, Parsons; 10x340mm L/45 A, 16x152mm L/50 QF A, 4xTT 533mm	8 Jun 1911; 1 Aug 1911; 3 Aug 1913; 1914	1 Aug 1914 seized by the British government 19 Aug 1914 HMS Erin; 19 Dec 1922 sold for breaking up.
Fâtih Sultân Mehmed (Mehmed II)	Vickers Ltd., Barrow Yd No 460; LOA 170.5m, LPP 160.8m, B 27.9m, 8.5m 23,000t / 25,250t (full road), Steel; 21kts - Version of King George V-class battleship	Steam turbines, 4 shafts 15, Babcock & Wilcox, - 4 turbines, 26,500shp, Parsons; 10x340mm L/45 A, 16x152mm L/50 QF A, 4xTT 533mm	29 Apr 1914; 11 Jun 1914; Jul. 1914 work stopped by order of the British government Aug. 1914 dismantled on the slipway.	- - - -

=== Sultân Osmân-ı Evvel (battleship) ===
Name (Namesake)	Builder Dimensions Displacement, Hull Speed Complement	Machinery Boiler, Bunkers Engines Armament	Ordered Laid down Launched Trials	Commissioned Decommissioned Afterward
Sultân Osmân-ı Evvel (Osman I)	Armstrong Whitworth, Newcastle; LOA 204.7m, B 27.1m, D 8.2m 27.500t (full road), Steel; 22kts -	Stem turbine, 4 shafts 22, Babcock & Wilcox, 3200t coal, 620t oil 4 turbine, 34,000shp 14x305mm L/45 A, 20x152mm QF A, 6x75mm QF A, 2x75mm QF A, 3xTT	1911 ( Brazil, Rio de Janeiro); 14 Sep 1911; 22 Jan 1913; Aug. 1914	9 Jan 1914 sold to the Ottoman government. 2 Aug 1914 seized by the British government. Aug. 1914 HMS Agincourt; 1920 decommissioned 19 Dec 1922 sold for breaking up.

=== Yavûz Sultân Selîm (battlecruiser) ===
Name (Namesake)	Builder Dimensions Displacement, Hull Speed Complement	Machinery Boiler, Bunkers Engines Armament	Ordered Laid down Launched Trials	Commissioned Decommissioned Afterward
Yavûz Sultân Selîm (Selim I)	Blohm & Voss AG., Hamburg, Yd No 200; LPP 186.5m, B 29.5m, D 8.7m 22.979t / 25.400t (full road), Steel; 1050 (1914), 1322 Germans, 24 Ottomans (1915), 1280 (1930); Moltke-class battlecruiser	Steam turbine, 4 shafts 24 Marine, Blohm & Voss, 3100t coal 4 turbines, 85,000shp, Parsons-Vlohm & Voss; 10x280mm L/50 K, 12x150mm L/45 K, 10x88mm L/45, 4xTT 500mm SK (1914), 10x280mm L/50 K, 10x150mm L/45 K, 16x88mm L/45, 4xTT 500mm SK (1916), 10x280mm L/50 K, 10x150mm L/45 K, 6x88mm L/45, 2xTT 500mm SK (1930), 10x280mm L/50 K, 12x150mm L/45 K, 8x88mm L/45, 10x40mm, 2xTT 500mm SK (1941)	1909; 12 Aug 1909; 28 Mar 1911; Jun. 1912	2 Jul 1912 ( SMS Goeben); 16 Aug 1914 ( Yavûz Sultân Selîm); 20 Dec 1950; 1930 renamed Yavuz Selim; 1936 renamed Yavuz; 1971 sold for breaking up to MKE (Seymen). 7 Jun 1973 towed from Gölcük to Seymen. Jul. 1973 – Feb. 1976 breaking up.

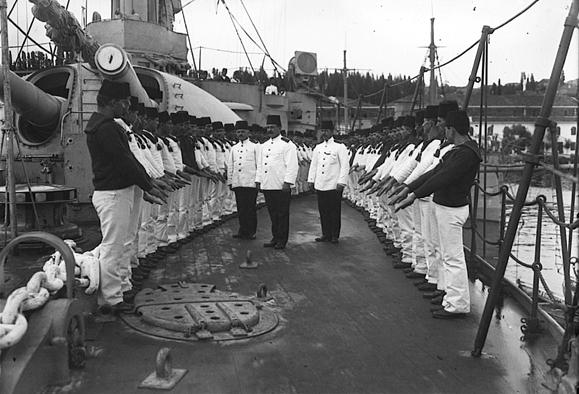
Turgut Reis-class battleship (Barbaros Hayreddin or Turgut Reis)nın güvertesinde yapılan teftiş.

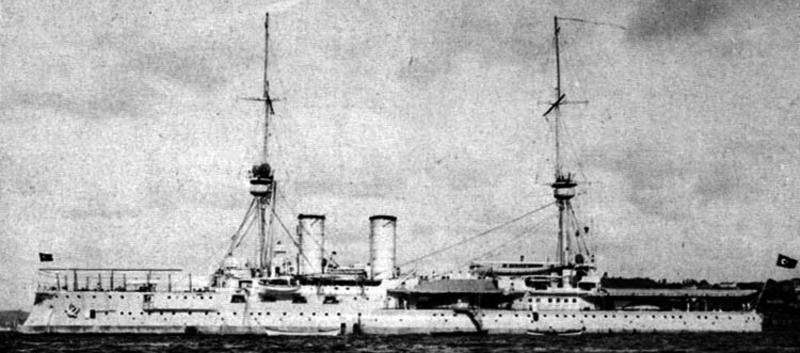
Turgut Reis

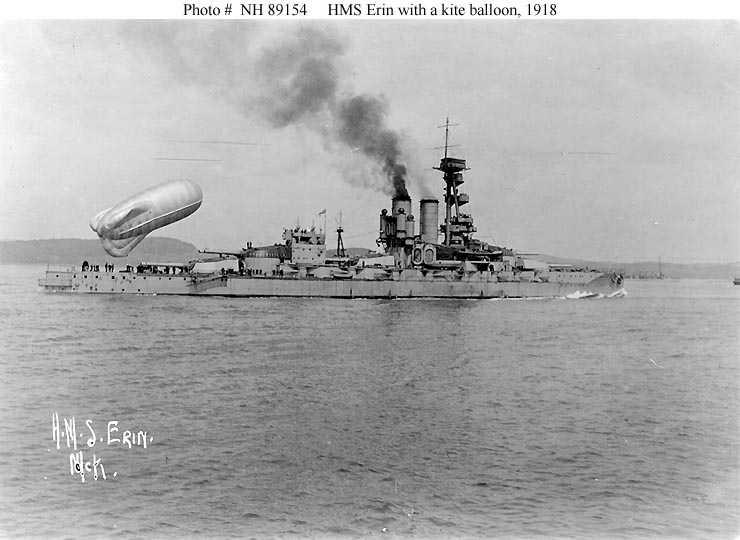
HMS Erin (1918)

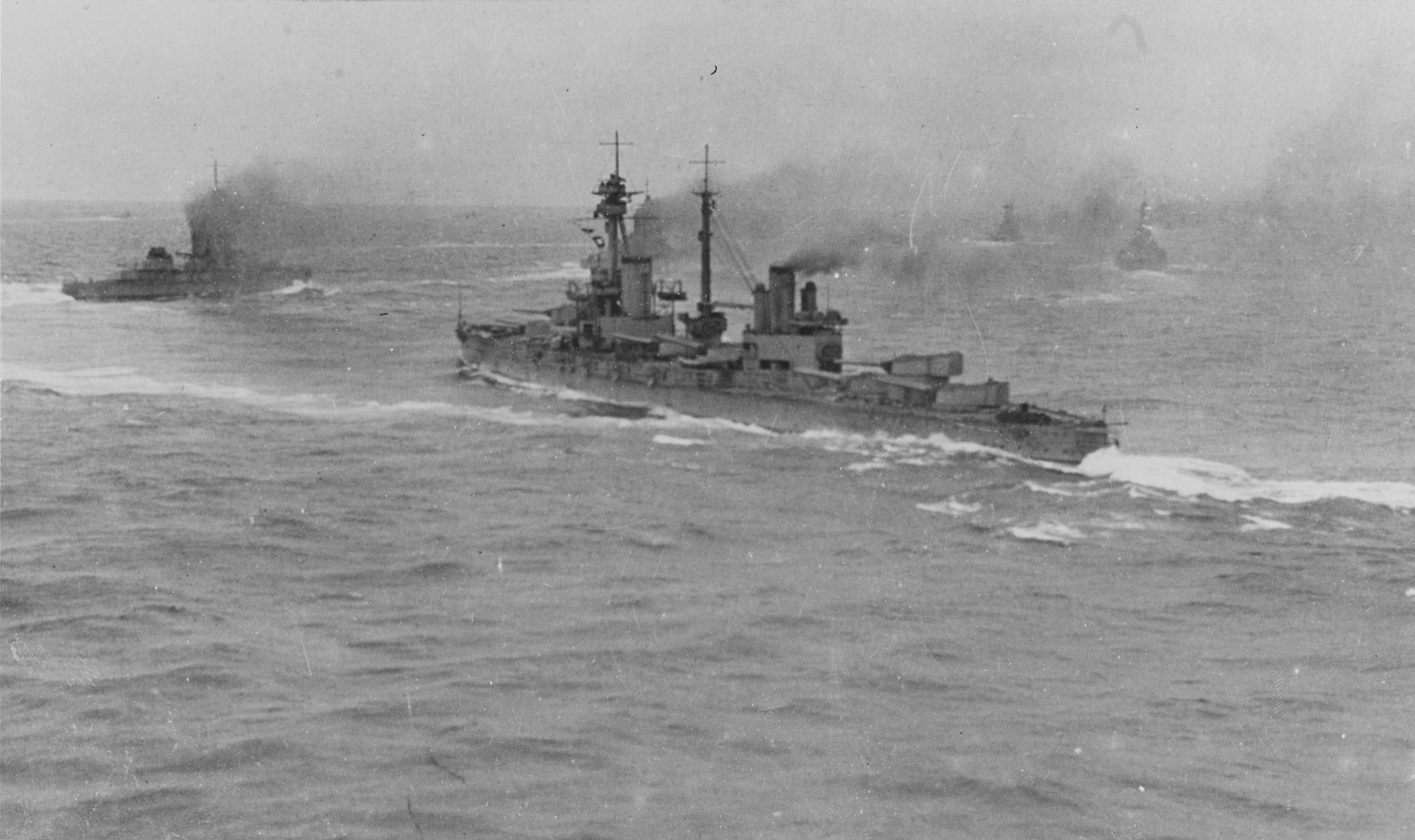
HMS Agincourt (1918)

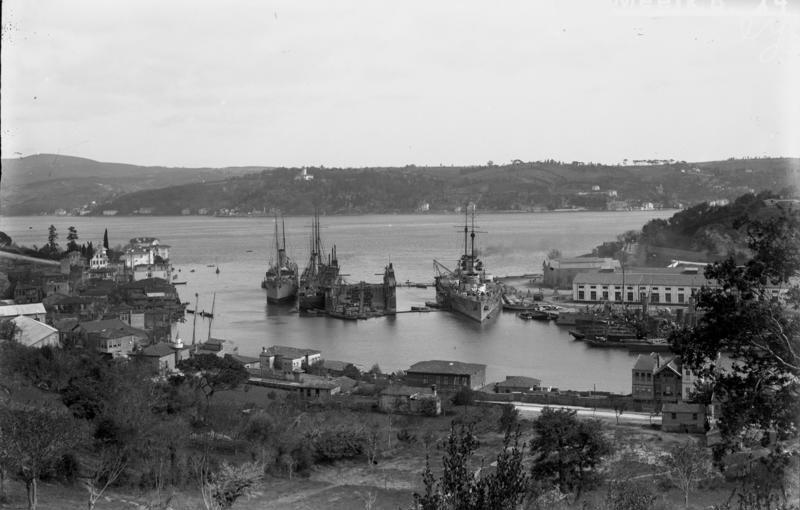
Yavuz Sultan Selim at Stenia, Constantinople

== Cruiser (Kruvazör) ==
=== Ottoman cruiser Lütf-ü Hümayun (3rd class unprotected cruiser) ===
Name (Namesake)	Builder Dimensions Displacement, Hull Speed Complement	Machinery Boiler, Bunkers Engines Armament	Ordered Laid down Launched Trials	Commissioned Decommissioned Afterward
Lütf-ü Hümayun ("Imperial Favour")	Tersâne-i Âmire, Istanbul, Constantinople; LPP 64.0m, B 9.1m, D 3.9m 1313t, Composite, wood sheathed 12kts -	Steam, 1 shaft 2 cyl., Tersâne-i Âmire, 205t coal 1xVTE, 3 cyl., 2160ihp, Tersâne-i Âmire; 3x170mm L/25 QF K, 6x120mm L/25 K, 6x47mm QF H, 2xTT 450mm SK (1896), 2x150mm L/40 QF K, 2x120mm L/40 QF K, 4x37mm QF, 2xTT 450 SK (1899), Disarmed (1905)	1880; 1882; 16 Aug 1892; Jul. 1896	Oct. 1896; 1908; Nov. 1911 sold for breaking up. 1921 breaking up completed.

=== Feyzâ-i Bahri class (cruiser) ===
Name (Namesake)	Builder Dimensions Displacement, Hull Speed Complement	Machinery Boiler, Bunkers Engines Armament	Ordered Laid down Launched Trials	Commissioned Decommissioned Afterward
Feyzâ-i Bahri ("Abundance of the Sea")	Tersâne-i Âmire, Istanbul, Constantinople; LPP 68,5m, B 10,6m, D 4,2m 1612t, Steel/composite; 17kts -	Steam, 2 shafts 2 cyl., Tersâne-i Âmire, - 2xVTE 3 cyl., 3500 ihp, Tersâne-i Âmire; 6x150mm L/45 QF K, 4x47mm QF H, 5xTT 450mm ST	May 1889; May 1891; 1897 works stopped 1906–09 slipway cleared.	- - - -
Şadiye ("Happiness")	Tersâne-i Âmire, Istanbul, Constantinople; LPP 68,5m, B 10,6m, D 4,2m 1612t, Steel/composite; 17kts -	Steam, 2 shafts 2 cyl., Tersâne-i Âmire, - 2xVTE 3 cyl., 3500 ihp, Tersâne-i Âmire; 6x150mm L/45 QF K, 4x47mm QF H, 5xTT 450mm ST	May 1889; 9 Nov 1891; 1897 works stopped 1906–09 slipway cleared.	- - - -

=== Hüdâvendigâr class (unprotected cruiser) ===
Name (Namesake)	Builder Dimensions Displacement, Hull Speed Complement	Machinery Boiler, Bunkers Engines Armament	Ordered Laid down Launched Trials	Commissioned Decommissioned Afterward
Hüdâvendigâr (Murad I)	Tersâne-i Âmire, Istanbul, Constantinople; LPP 85.4m, 15.2m, 6.1m 4050t, Steel - -	Steam, 1 shaft, (2 shafts in 1902); 4 cyl., Tersâne-i Âmire (design), - 2 triple expansion 3 cyl., Tersâne-i Âmire (design); 2x210mm BL K, 6x150mm BL K, 4x100mm BL K, 5xTT 450mm SK (1891 design), 2x150mm L/40 QF K, 6x105mm L/40 QF K, 4x47mm QF K, 4xMG, 4xTT 450 mm SK (1902 design)	1891; 1893; 1897 works stopped 1902 design modified into 2 screw ship 1905–09 slipway cleared.	- - - -
Selimiye (Selim III)	Tersâne-i Âmire, Istanbul, Constantinople; LPP 85,4m, 15,2m, 6,1m 4050t, Steel - -	Steam, 1 shaft, (2 shafts in 1902); 4 cyl., Tersâne-i Âmire (design), - 2 triple expansion 3 cyl., Tersâne-i Âmire (design); 2x210mm BL K, 6x150mm BL K, 4x100mm BL K, 5xTT 450mm SK (1891 design)	1891; Jul. 1891 works started 1892 cancelled -	- - - -

=== Peyk-i Şevket class (torpedo cruiser) ===
Name (Namesake)	Builder Dimensions Displacement, Hull Speed Complement	Machinery Boiler, Bunkers Engines Armament	Ordered Laid down Launched Trials	Commissioned Decommissioned Afterward
Peyk-i Şevket ("Satellite of God's greatness")	Schiffs & Maschinenbau Germania AG, Kiel Yd No 126; LPP 80.1m, B 8.4m, D 4.6m 775t (1907), 850t (1938), Steel; 18kts (1915); 125 (1907), 145 (1915)	Steam, 2 shafts 4 Schultz water-tube boilers, Germania, 244t coal 2xVTE, 5100ihp, Germania; 2x105mm QF L/40 K, 6x57mm SA L/40 K, 2x37mm QF K, 2xMG H, 3xTT 450mm SK (1907), 2x88mm QF L/40 K, 4x37mm QF K, 2xTT 450mm SK (1938)	18 Jan 1903; Feb. 1906; 15 Nov 1906; 1907	Nov. 1907; 6 Aug 1915 damaged by torpedo from British submarine HMS E11 neare Silivri. 1924 renamed Peyk; 1944 decommissioned 1953–1954 broken up at Gölcük.
Berk-i Satvet ("Lightning of the Almighty")	Schiffs & Maschinenbau Germania AG, Kiel Yd No 127; LPP 80.1m, B 8.4m, D 4.6m 775t (1907), 850t (1938), Steel; 18kts (1915); 125 (1907), 145 (1915)	Steam, 2 shafts 4 Schultz water-tube boilers, Germania, 244t coal 2xVTE, 5100ihp, Germania; 2x105mm QF L/40 K, 6x57mm SA L/40 K, 2x37mm QF K, 2xMG H, 3xTT 450mm SK (1907), 2x88mm QF L/40 K, 4x37mm QF K, 2xTT 450mm SK, 25 mines (1938)	18 Jan 1903; Feb. 1906; 1 Dec 1906; 1907	Nov. 1907; 2 Jan 1915 damaged by Russian mine off Bosporus. 1924 renamed Berk; 1945 decommissioned 1953–1954 broken up at İzmit.

=== Mecidiye (protected cruiser) ===
Name (Namesake)	Builder Dimensions Displacement, Hull Speed Complement	Machinery Boiler, Bunkers Engines Armament	Ordered Laid down Launched Trials	Commissioned Decommissioned Afterward
Mecidiye (Abdülmecid I)	William Cramp & Sons, Philadelphia Yd Nr 315; LOA 102.4m, LPP 100.5m, B 12.8m, D 4.8m 3485t / 3967t (full road), Steel; 18kts (1914), 20kts (1936)	Steam, 2 shafts 16 Niclausse water-tube boilers, William Cramp & Son., 16 Babcock & Wilcox water-tube boilers (1936), 610t coal 2x152mm QF L/45 B, 8x120mm QF L/45 B, 6x47mm QF B, 6x37mm QF B, 2xTT 457mm WH (1901), 2x152mm QF L/45 B, 2x120mm QF L/45 B, 2xTT 457mm WH (1918), 4x130mm QF L/56 V, 4x76mm QF L/50 S, 2xTT 457mm WH (1927)	1900; 7 Nov 1901; 25 Jul 1903 (as Abdül Mecid); Oct. 1903	19 Dec 1903 (as Mecidiye); 3 Apr 1915 sunk by Russian mine 15 nautical miles off Vorontsov Lighthouse (Odessa). 8 Jun 1915 salvaged by the Russians; 29 Oct 1915 commissioned as Imperial Russian Navy Prut; 1 May 1918 seized by the Germans at Sevastopol. 13 May 1918 returned to the Ottoman Navy. 1940 stationary cadet training ship at Gölcük. 1 Mar 1947 decommissioned, laid up at Gölcük. 1952 sold for breaking up. 1952–1956 broken up.

=== Hamidiye (protected cruiser) ===
Name (Namesake)	Builder Dimensions Displacement, Hull Speed Complement	Machinery Boiler, Bunkers Engines Armament	Ordered Laid down Launched Trials	Commissioned Decommissioned Afterward
Hamidiye (Abdülhamid II)	Sir W. G. Armstrong, Whitworth & Co., Newcastle Yd No 732; LOA 112.0m, LPP 103.6m, B 14.5m, D 4.8m 3904t, Steel; 16kts (1915); 400 (1904), 340 Ottoman, 15 German (1915)	Steam, 3 shafts 16 Niclausse water-tube boilers, 600t coal 2xVTE 4 cyl., 12,000ihp, Hawthorn, Leslie; 2x150mm QF L/45 A, 8x120mm QF L/50 A, 6x37mm QF A, 2xTT 457mm (1904), 2x150mm QF L/45 A, 6x120mm QF L/50 A, 2x46mm QF L/50, 2x37mm QF A, 2xTT 457mm (1915), 2x150mm L/45 QF K, 8x75mm QF L/45 K, 2xTT 457mm, 70 mines (1927)	1900; Apr. 1902; 25 Sep 1903; 17 Dec 1903	Apr. 1904; 21 Nov 1912 damaged by Bulgarian torpedo off Varna. 1940 cadet training ship Mar. 1947 decommissioned 1949–1951 Navy museum at Kabataş; 10 Sep 1964 sold for breaking up. 1966 breaking up completed.

=== Drama (protected cruiser) ===
Name (Namesake)	Builder Dimensions Displacement, Hull Speed Complement	Machinery Boiler, Bunkers Engines Armament	Ordered Laid down Launched Trials	Commissioned Decommissioned Afterward
Drama (Drama)	Ansaldo-Armstrong & Cie, Sestri Ponente Yd No 156; LOA 111.8m, B 14.5m, D 5.5m 3760t / 4466t (full road), Steel; 22.9kts (trial); 21 officers, 286 ratings (design)	Steam, 3 shafts -, - 2xVTE 4 cyl., 11,530ihp, Ansaldo; 2x152mm QF A, 8x180mm QF A, 8x47mm QF A, 6x37mm QF, 2xTT 457mm	Apr. 1904; 1907; 11 Nov 1912; Mar. 1913	Sep. 1912 seized by Italian government 25 Mar 1913 Royal Italian Navy RN Libia. 11 Mar 1937 decommissioned.

=== Midilli (light cruiser) ===
Name (Namesake)	Builder Dimensions Displacement, Hull Speed Complement	Machinery Boiler, Bunkers Engines Armament	Ordered Laid down Launched Trials	Commissioned Decommissioned Afterward
Midilli (Mytilini)	AG Vulcan, Stettin; Yd No 312; LOA 138.7m, LPP 136.0m, B 13.5m, D 5.1m 4570t / 5587t (full road), Steel; 25kts (trial); 350 (1914). 426 Germans, 6 Ottomans (1915)	Steam, 4 shafts 16 marine, AG Vulcan, 1200t coal, 106t oil 2 AEG-Vulcan steam turbines, 33,740shp 12x105mm L/45 K, 2xTT 500mm SW (1914), 2x150mm L/45 K, 10x105mm L/45 K, 2xTT 500mm SH (1916), 8x150mm L/45 K, 2xTT 500mm SW (1917)	1910 Magdeburg-class light cruiser 1911; 16 May 1911; 1912	10 May 1912 (Kriegsmarine SMS Breslau); 16 Aug 1914 transferred to the Ottoman Navy, renamed Midilli; 20 Jan 1918 sunk after hitting four mines during the Battle of Imbros (40.05°N 26.02°E).

=== Armstrong type scout cruiser ===
Name (Namesake)	Builder Dimensions Displacement, Hull Speed Complement	Machinery Boiler, Bunkers Engines Armament	Ordered Laid down Launched Trials	Commissioned Decommissioned Afterward
Armstrong type	Armstrong Whitworth, Newcastle upon Tyne; LOA 128.9m, LPP 121.9m, B 12.5m, D 4.1m 3550t (design), - 27kts (design) -	3 shafts, Parsons turbine 11 Yarrow small tube boilers, 700t coal, 250t oil 1 cruising turbine, 24.000shp 2x152mm L/50, 4x3pdr, 2x3inch, 2xTT 533mm	1914 - - -	Two scout cruisers were ordered. When the war broke out the little work done on them ceased.

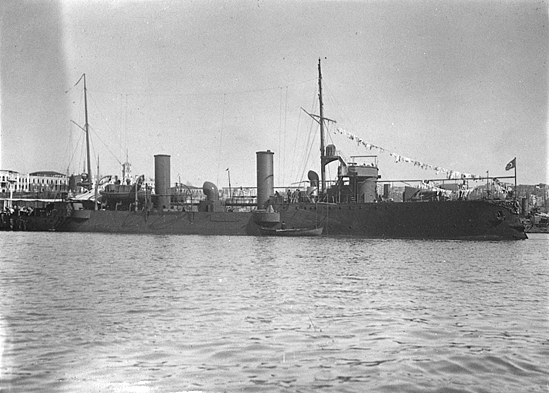
Peyk-i Şevket

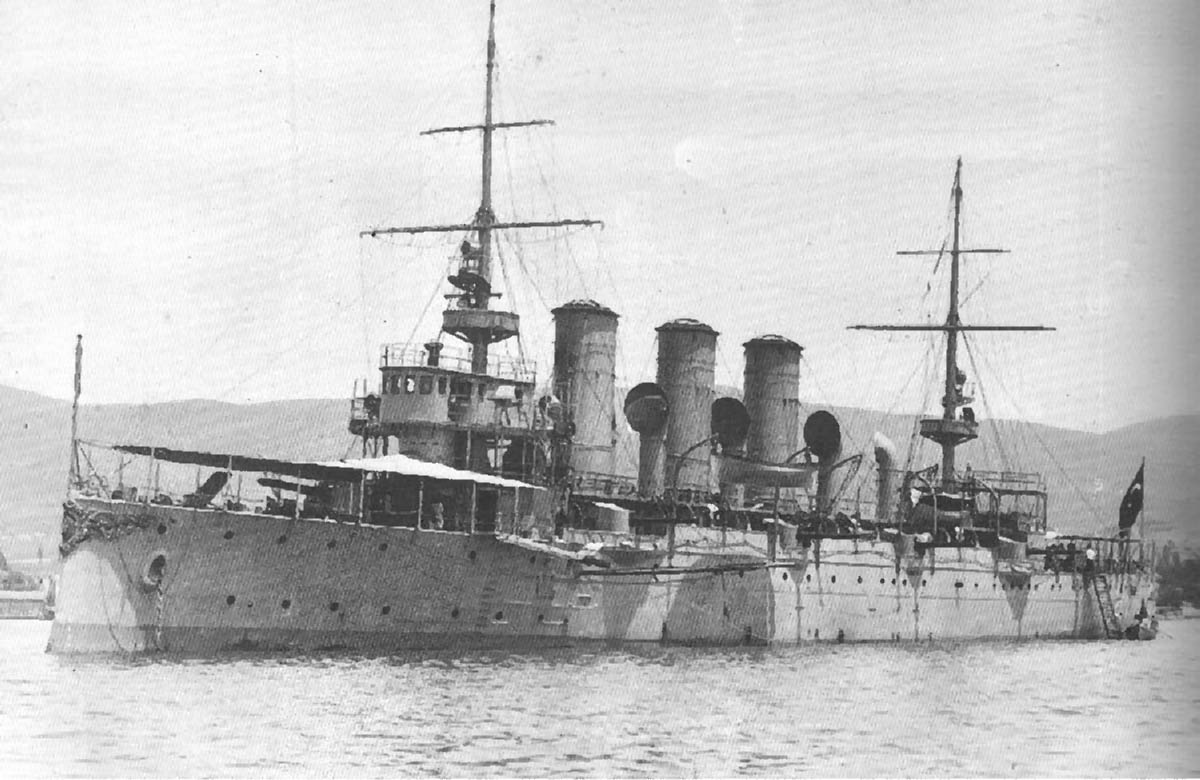
Mecidiye (Salonika, 1911)

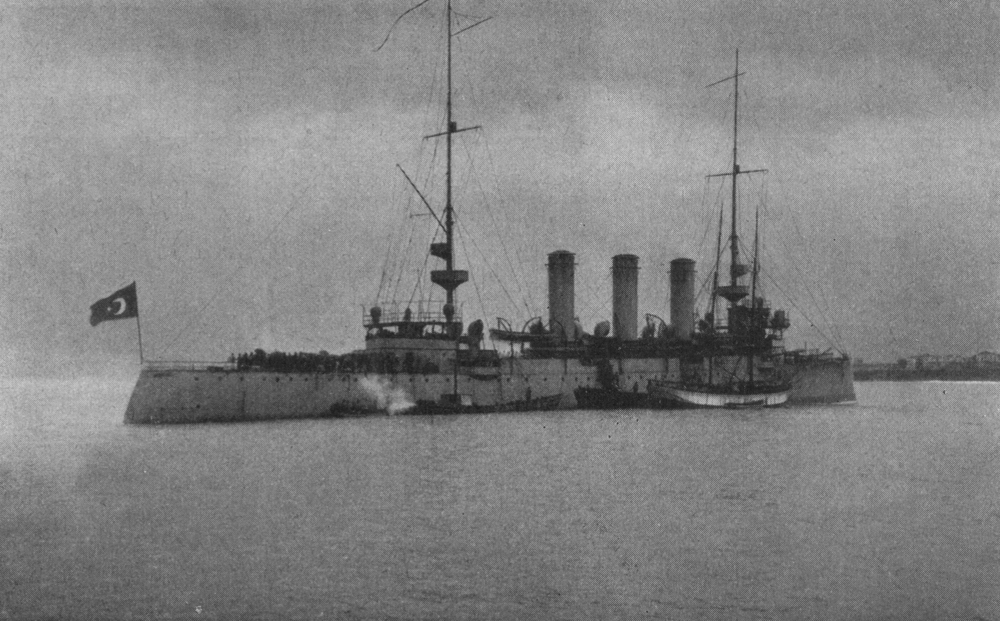
Hamidiye (1913)

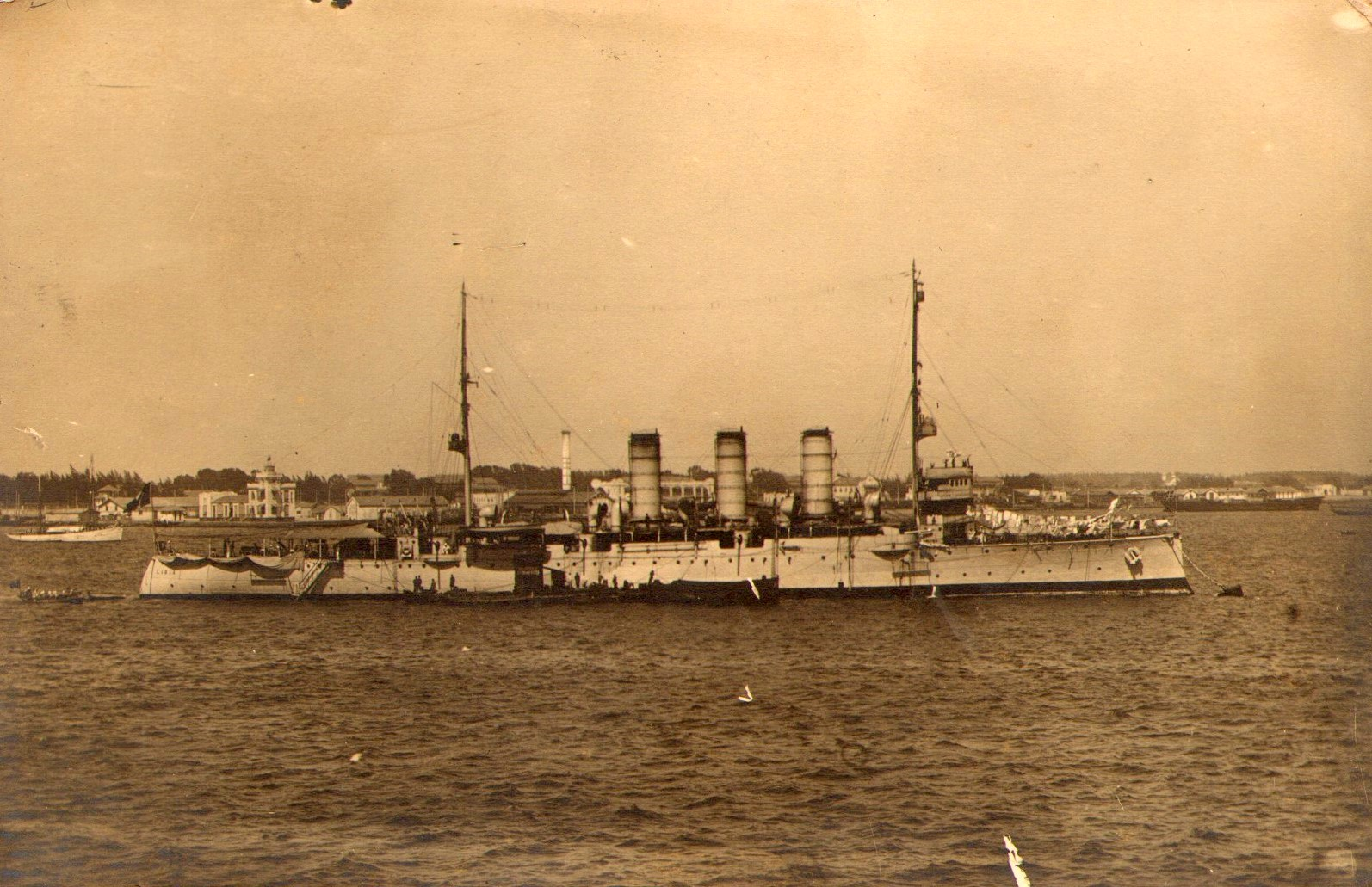
Regia Marina Italiana RN Libia

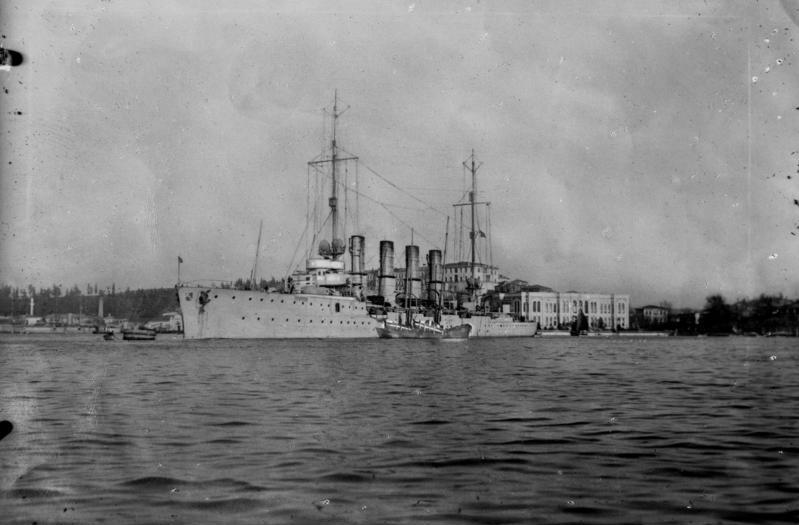
Midilli (Constantinople, 1914).

== Torpedo boats ==
=== Torpedo steam boat (Torpido stimbotu) ===
==== Burhâneddîn class (2nd class torpedo boat) ====
Name (Namesake)	Builder Dimensions Displacement, Hull Speed Complement	Machinery Boiler, Bunkers Engines Armament	Ordered Laid down Launched Trials	Commissioned Decommissioned Afterward
Burhâneddîn (Burhaneddin Efendi)	SA des Forges et Chantiers de la Méditerranée, La Seyne; LOA 31.7m, LPP 30.8m, B 3.6m, D 1.7m 38t, Iron; 17kts (trial), 10kts (1887); 4 officers, 20 ratings	Steam, 1 shaft 1 locomotive type, La Seyne, 4.7t coal 1 compound 2 cyl., 525ihp, La Seyne; 1x34mm RC N, 1x25mm RC N, 2xTT 355mm WH, 1xMacEvoy spar torpedo	May 1885; 1885; Aug. 1885; 1885	Oct. 1885; 1902 unfit for service 31 Jul 1909 auctioned for scrapping Nov. 1909 towed away.
Tevfik ("Divine assistance")	SA des Forges et Chantiers de la Méditerranée, La Seyne; LOA 31.7m, LPP 30.8m, B 3.6m, D 1.7m 38t, Iron; 17kts (trial), 10kts (1887); 4 officers, 20 ratings	Steam, 1 shaft 1 locomotive type, La Seyne, 4.7t coal 1 compound 2 cyl., 525ihp, La Seyne; 1x34mm RC N, 1x25mm RC N, 2xTT 355mm WH, 1xMacEvoy spar torpedo	May 1885; 1885; Aug. 1885; Nov. 1885	Nov. 1885; 1902 unfit for service 31 Jul 1909 auctioned for scrapping Nov. 1909 towed away.

==== Mecidiye class (2nd class torpedo boat) ====
Name (Namesake)	Builder Dimensions Displacement, Hull Speed Complement	Machinery Boiler, Bunkers Engines Armament	Ordered Laid down Launched Trials	Commissioned Decommissioned Afterward
Mecidiye (Abdülmecid I)	Tersâne-i Âmire, Istanbul, Constantinople; LOA 31.7m, LPP 30.8m, B 3.6m, D 1.7m 38t, Iron; 17kts (trial), 10kts (1887); 4 officers, 20 ratings local version of Burhaneddin class	Steam, 1 shaft 1 locomotive type, Tersâne-i Âmire, 4.7t coal 1 compound 2 cyl., 450ihp, Tersâne-i Âmire; 1x34mm RV N, 1x25mm RV N, 2xTT 355mm WH	May 1883; Feb. 1886; 1887; 1889	Jun. 1889; 1902 unift for service 31 Jul 1909 auctioned for scrapping Nov. 1909 towed away.
Eser-i Terakki ("Work of Progress")	Tersâne-i Âmire, Istanbul, Constantinople; LOA 31.7m, LPP 30.8m, B 3.6m, D 1.7m 38t, Iron; 17kts (trial), 10kts (1887); 4 officers, 20 ratings local version of Burhaneddin class	Steam, 1 shaft 1 locomotive type, Tersâne-i Âmire, 4.7t coal 1 compound 2 cyl., 450ihp, Tersâne-i Âmire; 1x34mm RV N, 1x25mm RV N, 2xTT 355mm WH	May 1883; Feb. 1886; 1887; 1890	Aug. 1890; 1902 unift for service Nov. 1909 auctioned for scrapping
Nimet ("Blessing")	Tersâne-i Âmire, Istanbul, Constantinople; LOA 31.7m, LPP 30.8m, B 3.6m, D 1.7m 38t, Iron; 17kts (trial), 10kts (1887); 4 officers, 20 ratings local version of Burhaneddin class	Steam, 1 shaft 1 locomotive type, Tersâne-i Âmire, 4.7t coal 1 compound 2 cyl., 450ihp, Tersâne-i Âmire; 1x34mm RV N, 1x25mm RV N, 2xTT 355mm WH	May 1883; May 1886; 1888; 1893	Nov. 1893; 1902 unift for service Nov. 1909 auctioned for scrapping
Şanaver ("Messenger of Glory")	Tersâne-i Âmire, Istanbul, Constantinople; LOA 31.7m, LPP 30.8m, B 3.6m, D 1.7m 38t, Iron; 17kts (trial), 10kts (1887); 4 officers, 20 ratings local version of Burhaneddin class	Steam, 1 shaft 1 locomotive type, Tersâne-i Âmire, 4.7t coal 1 compound 2 cyl., 450ihp, Tersâne-i Âmire; 1x34mm RV N, 1x25mm RV N, 2xTT 355mm WH	May 1883; May 1887; Jun. 1889 -	Engine and boiler not fitted Hull laid up at builder's yard Nov. 1909 auctioned for scrapping

==== Timsah (3rd class torpedo boat) ====
Name (Namesake)	Builder Dimensions Displacement, Hull Speed Complement	Machinery Boiler, Bunkers Engines Armament	Ordered Laid down Launched Trials	Commissioned Decommissioned Afterward
Timsah ("Crocodile")	De Vignes, Chertsey, London; LOA 28.6m, B 3.7m, D 1.4m 30t, Iron; 18kts (trial), 10kts (1889); 2 officers, 15 ratings (1887)	Steam, 1 shaft 1 locomotive type, Des Vignes, 4.8t 1 compound 2 cyl., 400ihp 2xTT 356mm WH	1885; 1885; 1885; 1885	1885 as Scirocco (British pleasure steamer); 1887 sold to Ottoman government 1887 commissioned 1889 utility boat at Salonika; 1897 yacht for the fleet commander 1903 decommissioned 31 Jul 1909 auctioned for scrapping 1912 broken up.

==== Şemşir-i Hücûm (3rd class torpedo boat) ====
Name (Namesake)	Builder Dimensions Displacement, Hull Speed Complement	Machinery Boiler, Bunkers Engines Armament	Ordered Laid down Launched Trials	Commissioned Decommissioned Afterward
Şemşir-i Hücûm ("Attack Sword")	Forges et Chantiers de la Méditerranée, La Seyne; LOA 19.0m, B 2.3m, D 0.8m 14t, 0.7t coal 15kts (trial), 9kts (1889); 1 officer, 2 ratings	Steam, 1 shaft 1 locomotive type, La Seyne, 0.7t coal 1 compound 2 cyl., 120ihp, La Seyne; 2xTT 356mm WH	May 1885; 1885; 1885; 1886	1886; Non-autonomous craft carried in ironclad Hamidiye; 1896 decommissioned 31 Jul 1909 auctioned for scrapping 1912 broken up.

=== Torpedo boat (Torpido botu) ===
==== Mahabbet class ====
Name (Namesake)	Builder Dimensions Displacement, Hull Speed Complement	Machinery Boiler, Bunkers Engines Armament	Ordered Laid down Launched Trials	Commissioned Decommissioned Afterward
Mahabbet ("Friendship")	Des Vignes, Chertsey, London; LOP 38.1m, B 4.6m, D 1.9m 14t, Iron; 21kts (trial), 12kts (1886); 3 officers, 17 ratings	Steam, 1 shaft 1 locomotive type, La Seyne, 0.7t coal 1 coumpound 2cyl., 120ihp, La Seyne; 2xTT 356mm WH	1886; 1886; Dec. 1886; 1887	May 1887; 1892 out of service 31 Jul 1909 auctioned for scrapping.
Satvet ("Force")	Des Vignes, Chertsey, London; LOP 38.1m, B 4.6m, D 1.9m 14t, Iron; 21kts (trial), 12kts (1886); 3 officers, 17 ratings	Steam, 1 shaft 1 locomotive type, La Seyne, 0.7t coal 1 coumpound 2cyl., 120ihp, La Seyne; 2xTT 356mm WH	1886; 1886; Dec. 1886; 1887	May 1887; 1892 out of service 31 Jul 1909 auctioned for scrapping.

==== Gilyum class ====
Name (Namesake)	Builder Dimensions Displacement, Hull Speed Complement	Machinery Boiler, Bunkers Engines Armament	Ordered Laid down Launched Trials	Commissioned Decommissioned Afterward
Gilyum (Wilhelm II)	Fr Schichau AG, Elbing Yd No 273; LOA 37.7m, LPP 36.9m, B 4.8m, D 1.3m 85t, 18t coal 21kts (trial), 18kts (1887); 5 officers, 13 ratings	Steam, 1 shaft 1 locomotive type, Schichau, 18t coal 1 triple expansion 3 cyl., 980ihp, Schichau; 2x37mm RV K, 2xTT 428mm SK	1885; 1885; 1886; 10–13 Apr 1886	Jun. 1886; 1903 unfit for service 31 Jul 1909 auctioned for scrapping 1910 towed away.
Sâikı ("Motive")	Fr Schichau AG, Elbing Yd Nr 274; LOA 37.7m, LPP 36.9m, B 4.8m, D 1.3m 85t, 18t coal 21kts (trial), 18kts (1887); 5 officers, 13 ratings	Steam, 1 shaft 1 locomotive type, Schichau, 18t coal 1 triple expansion 3 cyl., 980ihp, Schichau; 2x37mm RV K, 2xTT 428mm SK	1885; 1885; 1886; 10–13 Apr 1886	Jun. 1886; 1903 unfit for service 31 Jul 1909 auctioned for scrapping 1910 towed away.
Tîr-i Zafer ("Arrow of Victory")	Fr Schichau AG, Elbing Yd Nr 275; LOA 37.7m, LPP 36.9m, B 4.8m, D 1.3m 85t, 18t coal 21kts (trial), 18kts (1887); 5 officers, 13 ratings	Steam, 1 shaft 1 locomotive type, Schichau, 18t coal 1 triple expansion 3 cyl., 980ihp, Schichau; 2x37mm RV K, 2xTT 428mm SK	1885; 1885; 1886; 10–13 Apr 1886	Jun. 1886; 1903 unfit for service 31 Jul 1909 auctioned for scrapping 1910 towed away.
Seyf-i Bahrî ("Sword of the Sea")	Fr Schichau AG, Elbing Yd Nr 276; LOA 37.7m, LPP 36.9m, B 4.8m, D 1.3m 85t, 18t coal 21kts (trial), 18kts (1887); 5 officers, 13 ratings	Steam, 1 shaft 1 locomotive type, Schichau, 18t coal 1 triple expansion 3 cyl., 980ihp, Schichau; 2x37mm RV K, 2xTT 428mm SK	1885; 1885; 1886; 10–13 Apr 1886	Jun. 1886; 1903 unfit for service 31 Jul 1909 auctioned for scrapping 1910 towed away.
Vesîle-i Nusret ("Opportunity of God's help")	Fr Schichau AG, Elbing Yd No 277; LOA 37.7m, LPP 36.9m, B 4.8m, D 1.3m 85t, 18t coal 21kts (trial), 18kts (1887); 5 officers, 13 ratings	Steam, 1 shaft 1 locomotive type, Schichau, 18t coal 1 triple expansion 3 cyl., 980ihp, Schichau; 2x37mm RV K, 2xTT 428mm SK	1885; 1885; 1886; 10–13 Apr 1886	Jun. 1886; 1903 unfit for service 31 Jul 1909 auctioned for scrapping 1910 towed away.

==== Nâsır class ====
Name (Namesake)	Builder Dimensions Displacement, Hull Speed Complement	Machinery Boiler, Bunkers Engines Armament	Ordered Laid down Launched Trials	Commissioned Decommissioned Afterward
Nâsır ("Helper")	Schiffs & Maschinenbau Germania AG, Kiel Yd No 31; LOA 39.0m, B 4.8m, D 1.1m 87t, Steel; 21kts (trial), 15kts (1890); 6 officers, 21 ratings	Steam, 1 shaft 1 locomotive type, Germania, 30t coal 1 triple expansion 3 cyl., 1200ihp, Germania; 2x37 RV K, 2xTT 428 SK	23 Oct 1886; 1887; 1887; 17 Sep 1889	Dec. 1889; 1909; 1922 sold for breaking up.
Fâtih (Mehmed II)	Schiffs & Maschinenbau Germania AG, Kiel Yd No 32LOA 39.0m, B 4.8m, D 1.1m 87t, Steel; 21kts (trial), 15kts (1890); 6 officers, 21 ratings	Steam, 1 shaft 1 locomotive type, Germania, 30t coal 1 triple expansion 3 cyl., 1200ihp, Germania; 2x37 RV K, 2xTT 428 SK	23 Oct 1886; 1887; 1887; 17 Sep 1889	Dec. 1889; 1911; 1913 sold for breaking up.
Nusret ("God's help")	Schiffs & Maschinenbau Germania AG, Kiel Yd No 33LOA 39.0m, B 4.8m, D 1.1m 87t, Steel; 21kts (trial), 15kts (1890); 6 officers, 21 ratings	Steam, 1 shaft 1 locomotive type, Germania, 30t coal 1 triple expansion 3 cyl., 1200ihp, Germania; 2x37 RV K, 2xTT 428 SK	23 Oct 1886; 1888; 1888; Nov. 1889	Feb. 1890; 1909; 31 Jul 1909 auctioned for scrapping 1913 broken up.
Şahâb ("Shooting star")	Schiffs & Maschinenbau Germania AG, Kiel Yd No 34LOA 39.0m, B 4.8m, D 1.1m 87t, Steel; 21kts (trial), 15kts (1890); 6 officers, 21 ratings	Steam, 1 shaft 1 locomotive type, Germania, 30t coal 1 triple expansion 3 cyl., 1200ihp, Germania; 2x37 RV K, 2xTT 428 SK	23 Oct 1886; 1888; 1888; Nov. 1889	Feb. 1890; 24 Mar 1901 heavily damaged by a boiler explosion at Salonika, 9 lives lost Towed to Constantinople, laid up 1911 broken up.
Târık ("Morning star")	Schiffs & Maschinenbau Germania AG, Kiel Yd No 35LOA 39.0m, B 4.8m, D 1.1m 87t, Steel; 21kts (trial), 15kts (1890); 6 officers, 21 ratings	Steam, 1 shaft 1 locomotive type, Germania, 30t coal 1 triple expansion 3 cyl., 1200ihp, Germania; 2x37 RV K, 2xTT 428 SK	23 Oct 1886; 1889; Sep. 1889; Dec. 1889	Mar. 1890; 1909; 31 Jul 1909 auctioned for scrapping 1911 broken up.
Pervîn ("Pleiades")	Schiffs & Maschinenbau Germania AG, Kiel Yd No 36LOA 39.0m, B 4.8m, D 1.1m 87t, Steel; 21kts (trial), 15kts (1890); 6 officers, 21 ratings	Steam, 1 shaft 1 locomotive type, Germania, 30t coal 1 triple expansion 3 cyl., 1200ihp, Germania; 2x37 RV K, 2xTT 428 SK	23 Oct 1886; 1889; Sep. 1889; Dec. 1889	May 1890; 1911; 1913 broken up.
Sehâm ("Arrows")	Schiffs & Maschinenbau Germania AG, Kiel Yd No 37LOA 39.0m, B 4.8m, D 1.1m 87t, Steel; 21kts (trial), 15kts (1890); 6 officers, 21 ratings	Steam, 1 shaft 1 locomotive type, Germania, 30t coal 1 triple expansion 3 cyl., 1200ihp, Germania; 2x37 RV K, 2xTT 428 SK	23 Oct 1886; 1889; 1889; Feb. 1889	May 1890; 21 Apr 1901 sunk at Beirut after a boiler explosion.

==== Ejder ====
Name (Namesake)	Builder Dimensions Displacement, Hull Speed Complement	Machinery Boiler, Bunkers Engines Armament	Ordered Laid down Launched Trials	Commissioned Decommissioned Afterward
Ejder ("Dragon")	Schiffs & Maschinenbau Germania AG, Kiel Yd No 36; LOA 49.2m, B 5.9m, 1.3m 138t, Steel; 24kts (trial), 20kts (1895); 5 officers, 17 ratings	Steam, 2 shafts 2 locomotive type, Germania, 50t coal 2 triple expansion 3 cyl., 2200ihp, Germania; 5x37mm RV K, 2xTT 428mm SK	23 Oct 1886; 1889; 1890; 1893	1893; 17 Nov 1897 ran aground near Smyrni towed to Constantinople, laid up 1903 returned to service, unfit for service 1909 decommissioned 1921 broken up.

==== Berk Efşân class ====
Name (Namesake)	Builder Dimensions Displacement, Hull Speed Complement	Machinery Boiler, Bunkers Engines Armament	Ordered Laid down Launched Trials	Commissioned Decommissioned Afterward
Berk Efşân ("Lightening Spreader")	Tersâne-i Âmire, Istanbul, Constantinople Yd No 41; LOA 59.9m, B 6.6m, D 2.4m 230t, Steel; 21kts (trial), 17kts (1896); 8 officers, 42 ratings (1894), 58 Ottomans, 4 Germans (1915)	Steam, 2 shafts 2 locomotive type, Germania, 75t coal 2 triple expansion 3 cyl., 3500ihp, Germania; 6x37mm RV K, 2xTT 428mm SK (1886), 4x37mm RV Km 2xTT 428mm SK (1912), 2x47mm L50 QF K, 2x47mm L/30 QF K, 2xTT 428mm SK (1915)	23 Oct 1886; 1891; 1892; 1894	1894; Oct. 1918; 1920 returned to service 1924 decommissioned 1928 stricken 1932 broken up.
Tayyâr ("Flying")	Tersâne-i Âmire, Istanbul, Constantinople Yd No 39; LOA 59.9m, B 6.6m, D 2.4m 230t, Steel; 21kts (trial), 17kts (1896); 8 officers, 42 ratings (1894)	Steam, 2 shafts 2 locomotive type, Germania, 75t coal 2 triple expansion 3 cyl., 3500ihp, Germania; 6x37mm RV K, 2xTT 428mm SK (1886)	23 Oct 1886; 1891; 1892; 1894	1894; 1906 unfit for service 1909 decommissioned 1921 broken up.

==== Hamidiye class ====
Name (Namesake)	Builder Dimensions Displacement, Hull Speed Complement	Machinery Boiler, Bunkers Engines Armament	Ordered Laid down Launched Trials	Commissioned Decommissioned Afterward
Hamidiye (Abdülhamid II)	Ansaldo, Armstrong & Cie, Genoa; LOA 50.6m, LPP 47.8m, B 5.6m, D 1.2m 145t, Steel; 26 kts (trial); 4 officers, 26 ratings (1902), 39 Ottomans, 4 Germans (1915)	Steam, 2 shafts 3 Yarrow water-tube, Ansaldo, 50t coal 2 triple expansion 3 cyl., 2400ihp, Ansaldo; 1x37mm QF H, 2xcTT 450mm SK (1902)	Mar. 1901; 1901; 1901; 1902	1902; 30 Sep 1911 sunk by Italian destroyer at Reşadiye (present day: Igoumenitsa).
Abdül Mecid (Yûnus) (Abdülmecid I)	Ansaldo, Armstrong & Cie, Genoa; LOA 50.6m, LPP 47.8m, B 5.6m, D 1.2m 145t, Steel; 26 kts (trial); 4 officers, 26 ratings (1902), 39 Ottomans, 4 Germans (1915)	Steam, 2 shafts 3 Yarrow water-tube, Ansaldo, 50t coal 2 triple expansion 3 cyl., 2400ihp, Ansaldo; 1x37mm QF H, 2xcTT 450mm SK (1902), 1x37mm QF H, 1xTT 450mm SK (1914), 1x47mm QF K, 1xTT 450mm SK	Mar. 1901; 1901; 1901; 1902	1902; May 1908 renamed Yûnus; 6 May 1915 grounded off Şarköy; 1 Mart 1918 collided with Draç off Tekfurdağı; Oct. 1918 decommissioned Feb 1919 anti-smaggling duty 1920 decommissioned 1923/24 refittied by Istanbul Deniz Fabrikası; 1926 returned to service 1929 decommissioned 1935 broken up.

==== Akhisar class ====
Name (Namesake)	Builder Dimensions Displacement, Hull Speed Complement	Machinery Boiler, Bunkers Engines Armament	Ordered Laid down Launched Trials	Commissioned Decommissioned Afterward
Akhisar (Akhisar)	Ansaldo, Armstrong & Cie, Genoa Yd No 131; LOA 50.6m, LPP 47.8m, B 5.6m, D 1.2m 165t, Steel; 24kts (trial), 14kts (1915); 4 officers, 26 ratings (1904), 36 Ottomans, 4 Germans (1915)	Steam, 2 shafts 2 locomotive type, Ansaldo, 60t coal 2 triple expansion 3 cyl., 2400ihp, Ansaldo; 2x37mm QF H, 2xTT 450mm SK (1904), 1x47mm QF K, 2x37mm QF H, 1xTT 450mm SK (1915)	Dec. 1902; 25 Apr 1904; 25 Apr 1904; 1904	Jun. 1904; 11 Dec 1915 aground near Silivri, towed to Constantinople; 1916 returned to service Oct. 1918 decommissioned Feb. 1919 anti-smuggling duty 1920 decommissioned 1924/25 refitted by Istanbul Deniz Fabrikası; 1925 returned to service 1935 broken up.
Alpagot ()	Ansaldo, Armstrong & Cie, Genoa Yd No 132; LOA 50.6m, LPP 47.8m, B 5.6m, D 1.2m 165t, Steel; 24kts (trial); 4 officers, 26 ratings (1904)	Steam, 2 shafts 2 locomotive type, Ansaldo, 60t coal 2 triple expansion 3 cyl., 2400ihp, Ansaldo; 2x37mm QF H, 2xTT 450mm SK (1904)	Dec. 1902; 1904; 30 Apr 1904; 1904	Jun. 1904; 30 Sep 1911 sunk by Italian destroyer at Reşadiye (present day: Igoumenitsa).

==== Antalya class ====
Name (Namesake)	Builder Dimensions Displacement, Hull Speed Complement	Machinery Boiler, Bunkers Engines Armament	Ordered Laid down Launched Trials	Commissioned Decommissioned Afterward
Antalya (Antalya)	Ansaldo, Armstrong & Cie, Genoa Yd No 134; LOP 51.0m, B 5.7m, D 1.4m 165t, Steel; 26kts (trial); 4 officers, 26 ratings	Steam, 2 shafts 2 water tube, Ansaldo, 60t coal 2 triple expansion 3 cyl., 2700ihp, Ansaldo; 2x37mm QF H, 2xTT 450mm SK	1901; Apr. 1904; 1904; 1905	Dec. 1906; 5 Nov 1912 scuttled by crew at Preveza; 29 Nov 1912 salvaged by the Greeks; 1913 Royal Greek Navy Nikopolis; 1919 out of service.
Urfa (Urfa)	Ansaldo, Armstrong & Cie, Genoa Yd No 135; LOP 51.0m, B 5.7m, D 1.4m 165t, Steel; 26kts (trial); 4 officers, 26 ratings	Steam, 2 shafts 2 water tube, Ansaldo, 60t coal 2 triple expansion 3 cyl., 2700ihp, Ansaldo; 2x37mm QF H, 2xTT 450mm SK	1901; Apr. 1904; 1904; 1905	Dec. 1906; 11 Dec 1908 sunk in heavy gale off Salonika.
Ankara (Ankara)	Ansaldo, Armstrong & Cie, Genoa Yd No 136; LOP 51.0m, B 5.7m, D 1.4m 165t, Steel; 26kts (trial); 4 officers, 26 ratings	Steam, 2 shafts 2 water tube, Ansaldo, 60t coal 2 triple expansion 3 cyl., 2700ihp, Ansaldo; 2x37mm QF H, 2xTT 450mm SK	1901; Apr. 1904; 1904; 1905	Dec. 1906; 24 Feb 1912 sunk by gunfire by Italian cruiser Giuseppe Garibaldi and Varese at Battle of Beirut.
Tokad (Tokat)	Ansaldo, Armstrong & Cie, Genoa Yd No 137; LOP 51.0m, B 5.7m, D 1.4m 165t, Steel; 26kts (trial); 4 officers, 26 ratings	Steam, 2 shafts 2 water tube, Ansaldo, 60t coal 2 triple expansion 3 cyl., 2700ihp, Ansaldo; 2x37mm QF H, 2xTT 450mm SK	1901; Apr. 1904; 1904; 1905	Dec. 1906; 29 Sep 1911 deliberately beached near Preveza; Nov. 1912 wreck taken to Preveza; 5 Nov 1911 scuttled by crew at Preveza; 29 Sep 1912 salvaged by the Greeks; 1913 Royal Greek Navy Tatoi; 1919 out of service.
Draç (Durrës)	Ansaldo, Armstrong & Cie, Genoa Yd No 138; LOP 51.0m, B 5.7m, D 1.4m 165t, Steel; 26kts (trial); 4 officers, 26 ratings (initial), 39 Ottomans, 4 Germans (1915)	Steam, 2 shafts 2 water tube, Ansaldo, 60t coal 2 triple expansion 3 cyl., 2700ihp, Ansaldo; 2x37mm QF H, 2xTT 450mm SK (initial), 1x57mm QF K, 2x37mm QF H, 1xTT 450mm SK (1915), 2x37mm QF H (1919)	1901; Apr. 1904; 1904; 1905	8 Jan 1907; 27 Jun 1915 aground off Şarköy; Oct. 1918 decommissioned Apr. 1919 anti-smuggling duty 1920 decommissioned 1924 returned to service 1924 decommissioned 1926 hulk employed at work barge at Gölcük; 1936 broken up.
Kütahya (Kütahya)	Ansaldo, Armstrong & Cie, Genoa Yd No 139; LOP 51.0m, B 5.7m, D 1.4m 165t, Steel; 26kts (trial); 4 officers, 26 ratings (initial), 39 Ottomans, 4 Germans (1915)	Steam, 2 shafts 2 water tube, Ansaldo, 60t coal 2 triple expansion 3 cyl., 2700ihp, Ansaldo; 2x37mm QF H, 2xTT 450mm SK (initial), 1x57mm QF K, 2x37mm QF H, 1xTT 450mm SK (1915)	1901; Apr. 1904; 1904; 1905	8 Jan 1907; 14 Sep 1916 sunk by mine north of Karaburun.
Mûsul (Musul)	Ansaldo, Armstrong & Cie, Genoa Yd No 140; LOP 51.0m, B 5.7m, D 1.4m 165t, Steel; 26kts (trial); 4 officers, 26 ratings	Steam, 2 shafts 2 water tube, Ansaldo, 60t coal 2 triple expansion 3 cyl., 2700ihp, Ansaldo; 2x37mm QF H, 2xTT 450mm SK (initial), 1x47mm QF K, 2x37mm WF H, 2xTT 450mm SK	1901; Apr. 1904; 1904; 1905	8 Jan 1907; Oct. 1918 decommissioned 1924 returned to service 1929 decommissioned 1936 broken up.

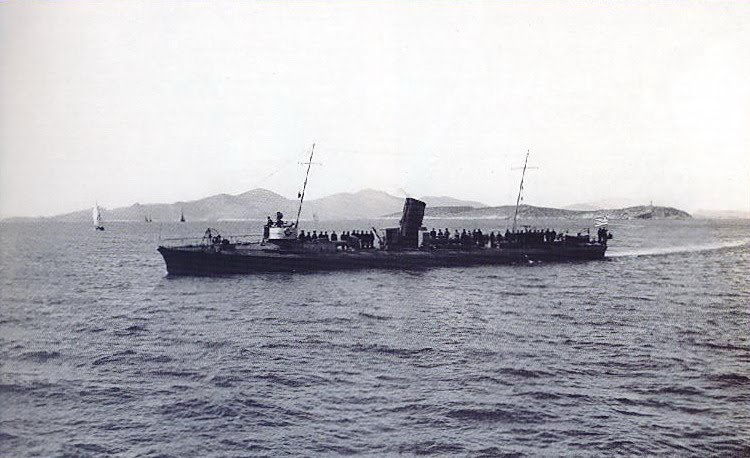
Antalya as RHN Nikopolis

==== Demirhisar class ====
Name (Namesake)	Builder Dimensions Displacement, Hull Speed Complement	Machinery Boiler, Bunkers Engines Armament	Ordered Laid down Launched Trials	Commissioned Decommissioned Afterward
Demirhisar (Demir Hisar)	Schneider & Cie, Chalon-sur-Saône; LOA 40.2m, LPP 38.0m, B 4.4m, D 1.9m 97t, Steel; 26kts (trial), 16kts (1915); 3 officers, 17–20 ratings (1907), 32 Ottomans, 4 Germans (1915)	Steam, 1 shaft 2 Du Temple water tube, Schneider & Cie, 11.2t coal 1 triple expansion 3cyl., 2200ihp, Schneider & Cie; 2x37mm QF H, 3xTT 450mm SK	25 Oct 1906; 1906; 1907; 1907	1907; 16 Apr 1915 beached, the crew of one German and twenty-three Ottomans in interned by the Greeks. Later Blown up by the British at Chios.
Sultanhisar (Sultanhisar)	Schneider & Cie, Chalon-sur-Saône; LOA 40.2m, LPP 38.0m, B 4.4m, D 1.9m 97t, Steel; 26kts (trial), 16kts (1915); 3 officers, 17–20 ratings (1907), 32 Ottomans, 4 Germans (1915)	Steam, 1 shaft 2 Du Temple water tube, Schneider & Cie, 11.2t coal 1 triple expansion 3cyl., 2200ihp, Schneider & Cie; 2x37mm QF H, 3xTT 450mm SK	25 Oct 1906; 1906; 1907; 1907	1907; Oct. 1918 decommissioned 1924 returned to service 1928 decommissioned 1935 broken up.
Sivrihisar (Sivrihisar)	Schneider & Cie, Chalon-sur-Saône; LOA 40.2m, LPP 38.0m, B 4.4m, D 1.9m 97t, Steel; 26kts (trial), 16kts (1915); 3 officers, 17–20 ratings (1907), 32 Ottomans, 4 Germans (1915)	Steam, 1 shaft 2 Du Temple water tube, Schneider & Cie, 11.2t coal 1 triple expansion 3cyl., 2200ihp, Schneider & Cie; 2x37mm QF H, 3xTT 450mm SK	25 Oct 1906; 1906; 1907; 1907	1907; Oct. 1918 decommissioned 1924 returned to service 1928 decommissioned 1935 broken up.
Hamidâbad (Hamidâbad)	Schneider & Cie, Chalon-sur-Saône; LOA 40.2m, LPP 38.0m, B 4.4m, D 1.9m 97t, Steel; 26kts (trial), 16kts (1915); 3 officers, 17–20 ratings (1907), 32 Ottomans, 4 Germans (1915)	Steam, 1 shaft 2 Du Temple water tube, Schneider & Cie, 11.2t coal 1 triple expansion 3cyl., 2200ihp, Schneider & Cie; 2x37mm QF H, 3xTT 450mm SK	25 Oct 1906; 1906; 1907; 1907	1907; 31 Oct 1917 sunk by Russian Derzky-class destroyers Pylky and Bystry at İğneada.

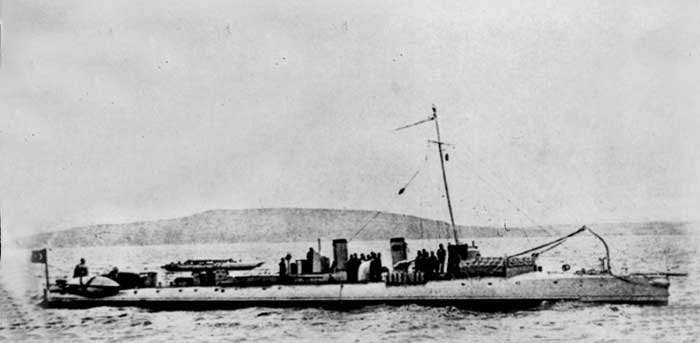
Sultânhisar

== Destroyer (Muhrip) ==
=== Samsun class ===
Name (Namesake)	Builder Dimensions Displacement, Hull Speed Complement	Machinery Boiler, Bunkers Engines Armament	Ordered Laid down Launched Trials	Commissioned Decommissioned Afterward
Samsun (Samsun)	SA Chantier et Ateliers de la Gironde, Bordeaux; LOA 58.2m, LPP 56.3m, 6.3m, 2.8m 284t, Steel; 28kts (1907), 20kts (1912), 17kts (1915); 7 officersm, 60 rating (1907), 74 Ottomans, 17 Germans (1915); French Durandal-class destroyer	Steam, 2 shafts 2 Normand, Chantier et Ateliers de la Gironde, - 2 triple expansion, 5950ihp, Chantier et Ateliers de la Gironde; 1x65mm L/50 QF C, 6x47mm L/50 QF C, 2xTT 450mm	1906; Jun. 1906; 1907; 1907	3 Sep 1907; Oct. 1918 laid up at Istanbul; 1924 returned to service 1932 decommissioned 1949 broken up at Gölcük.
Yarhisar (Yarhisar)	SA Chantier et Ateliers de la Gironde, Bordeaux; LOA 58.2m, LPP 56.3m, 6.3m, 2.8m 284t, Steel; 28kts (1907), 20kts (1912), 17kts (1915); 7 officersm, 60 rating (1907), 74 Ottomans, 17 Germans (1915); French Durandal-class destroyer	Steam, 2 shafts 2 Normand, Chantier et Ateliers de la Gironde, - 2 triple expansion, 5950ihp, Chantier et Ateliers de la Gironde; 1x65mm L/50 QF C, 6x47mm L/50 QF C, 2xTT 450mm	1906; Jun. 1906; 1907; 1907	1907; 3 Dec 1915 torpedoed and sunk by British submarine HMS E11 off Yalova.
Taşoz (Thasos)	Schneider & Cie, Nantes; LOA 58.2m, LPP 56.3m, 6.3m, 2.8m 284t, Steel; 28kts (1907), 20kts (1912), 17kts (1915); 7 officersm, 60 rating (1907), 74 Ottomans, 17 Germans (1915); French Durandal-class destroyer	Steam, 2 shafts 2 Schneider $ Cie, - 2 triple expansion, 5950ihp, Chantier et Ateliers de la Gironde; 1x65mm L/50 QF C, 6x47mm L/50 QF C, 2xTT 450mm	1906; Jun. 1906; 1906; 1907	1907; Oct. 1918 laid up at Istanbul; 1925 returned to service 1932 decommissioned 1949 broken up at Gölcük.
Basra (Basra)	SA Chantier et Ateliers de la Gironde, Bordeaux; LOA 58.2m, LPP 56.3m, 6.3m, 2.8m 284t, Steel; 28kts (1907), 20kts (1912), 17kts (1915); 7 officersm, 60 rating (1907), 74 Ottomans, 17 Germans (1915); French Durandal-class destroyer	Steam, 2 shafts 2 Normand, Chantier et Ateliers de la Gironde, - 2 triple expansion, 5950ihp, Chantier et Ateliers de la Gironde; 1x65mm L/50 QF C, 6x47mm L/50 QF C, 2xTT 450mm	1906; Jun. 1906; 1906; 1907	1907; Oct. 1918 laid up at Istanbul; 1925 returned to service 1932 decommissioned 1949 broken up at Gölcük.

=== Muâvenet-i Millîye class ===
Name (Namesake)	Builder Dimensions Displacement, Hull Speed Complement	Machinery Boiler, Bunkers Engines Armament	Ordered Laid down Launched Trials	Commissioned Decommissioned Afterward
Muavenet-i Milliye (National Support)	Fr Schichau AG, Elbing Yd No 820; LOA 74.0m, B 7.9m, D 3.0m 765t, Steel; 26kts (1912); 6 officers, 84 ratings (1911), 89 Ottomans, 23 Germans (1915)	Steam turbines, 2 schafts 2 marine, Schichau, 116t coal, 74t oil 2 turbines, 17,700shp, Schichau; 3xTT 450mm SK (1910), 2x75mm L/50 QF, 2x57mm L/50 QF, 3xTT 450mm SK (1911)	1908 as German S 165; 1908; 20 Mar 1909; 1910	March 1910 sold to Ottoman government 17 Aug 1910 commissioned at Çanakkale; 12–13 May 1915 sank battleship HMS Goliath; Oct. 1918 decommissioned.
Yadigar-i Millet ("Gift of the Nation")	Fr Schichau AG, Elbing Yd No 821; LOA 74.0m, B 7.9m, D 3.0m 765t, Steel; 26kts (1912); 6 officers, 84 ratings (1911), 89 Ottomans, 23 Germans (1915)	Steam turbines, 2 schafts 2 marine, Schichau, 116t coal, 74t oil 2 turbines, 17,700shp, Schichau; 3xTT 450mm SK (1910), 2x75mm L/50 QF, 2x57mm L/50 QF, 3xTT 450mm SK (1911)	1908 as German S 166; 1908; 24 Apr 1909; 1910	March 1910 sold to Ottoman government 17 Aug 1910 commissioned at Çanakkale; 9–10 Jul 1917 bombed and sunk by British aircraft at İstinye. 24 Oct 1917 floated and drydocked at Tersâne-i Âmire; Dec. 1918 moored in Golden Horn, later sunk 1924 raised and broken up.
Nümune-i Hamiyet ("Exemplar of Patriotism")	Fr Schichau AG, Elbing Yd No 822; LOA 74.0m, B 7.9m, D 3.0m 765t, Steel; 26kts (1912); 6 officers, 84 ratings (1911), 89 Ottomans, 23 Germans (1915)	Steam turbines, 2 schafts 2 marine, Schichau, 116t coal, 74t oil 2 turbines, 17,700shp, Schichau; 3xTT 450mm SK (1910), 2x75mm L/50 QF, 2x57mm L/50 QF, 3xTT 450mm SK (1911)	1908 as German S 167; 1908; 3 Jul 1909; 1910	March 1910 sold to Ottoman government 17 Aug 1910 commissioned at Çanakkale; Oct. 1918 decommissioned 1953 broken up commenced.
Gayret-i Vataniye ("Endeavour of Homeland")	Fr Schichau AG, Elbing No Yd 823; LOA 74.0m, B 7.9m, D 3.0m 765t, Steel; 26kts (1912); 6 officers, 84 ratings (1911), 89 Ottomans, 23 Germans (1915)	Steam turbines, 2 schafts 2 marine, Schichau, 116t coal, 74t oil 2 turbines, 17,700shp, Schichau; 3xTT 450mm SK (1910), 2x75mm L/50 QF, 2x57mm L/50 QF, 3xTT 450mm SK (1911)	1908 as German S 168; 1908; 30 Sep 1909; 1910	March 1910 sold to Ottoman government 17 Aug 1910 commissioned at Çanakkale; 27 Aug 1916 grounded at Varna.

=== Normand type ===
Name (Namesake)	Builder Dimensions Displacement, Hull Speed Complement	Machinery Boiler, Bunkers Engines Armament	Ordered Laid down Launched Trials	Commissioned Decommissioned Afterward
Normand type	A. Normand, Le Havre; L 87.5m, B 9.0m, D 3.2m 1040t (design), - 32kts (design) -	2 shafts, 4 Yarrow boilers, - 4 Parsons turbines, 22.000shp 5x100mm, 6xTT 533mm	May 1914; July 1914 - -	Six destroyers with temporary names No 1-6. shortened version of Russian Izyaslav class Construction was suspended at the beginning of the war.

=== Hawthorn Leslie type ===
Four 1100 ton class destroyer were ordered from Armstrong and subcontracted by Armstrong to Hawthorn Leslie. Material prepared for them was used for M-class destroyer HMS Napier (ordered in 1914 launched in 1916 and sold in 1921).

=== Impavido class ===
Four 700 ton class destroyers were ordered from Orlando, shortly before the war. But works were never begun.

=== Unknown ===
Six fast destroyers were authorized in March 1917. But works were never begun.

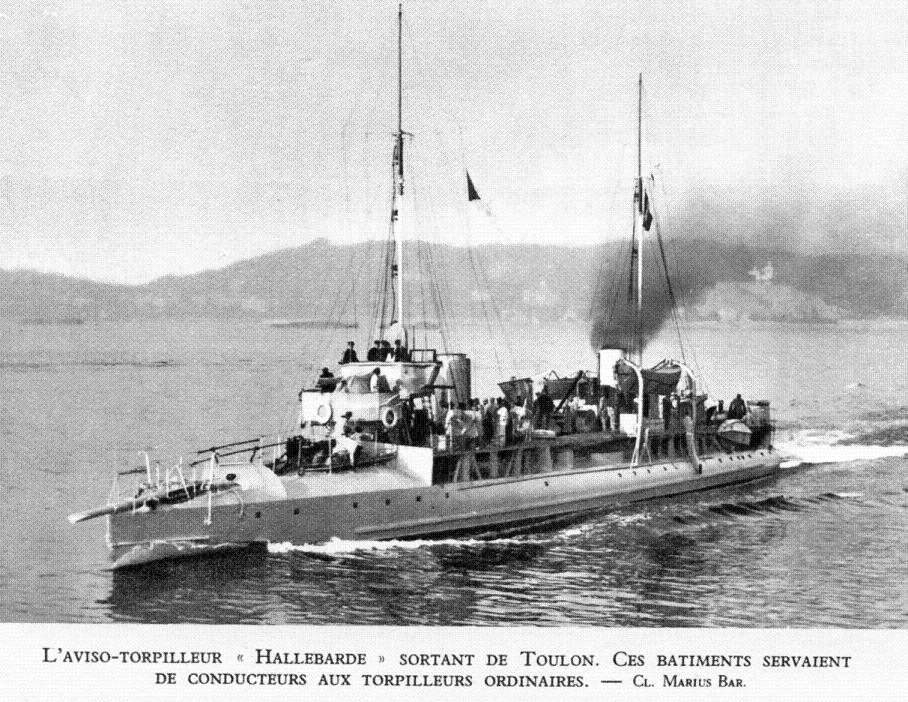
Durandal-class destroyer Hallebarde

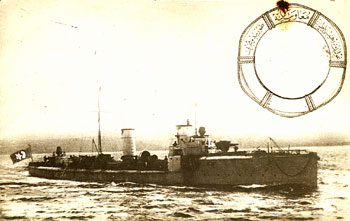
Muâvenet-i Millîye

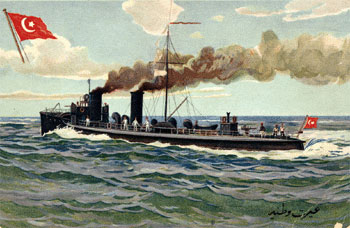
Gayret-i Vatâniye

== Submarine (Denizaltı) ==
=== Abdül Hamid class (Nordenfelt type) ===
Name (Namesake)	Builder Dimensions Displacement, Hull Speed Complement	Machinery Boiler, Bunkers Engines Armament	Ordered Laid down Launched Trials	Commissioned Decommissioned Afterward
Abdül Hamid; Abdülhamid II	Des Vignes, Chertsey, London; LOA 30.5m, B 3.6m 100t (surface)/160t (submerged), Steel; 6kts (surface)/4kts (submerged); 7	Steam, 1 shaft 1 cyl., 8t coal 1 Lamm locomotive type, 250ihp 2xTT 360mm WH, 2x35mm MG N	23 Jan 1886 - 6 Sep 1886; 5 Feb 1887	Built as Nordenfelt 2 in section fitted by Tersâne-i Âmire, Istanbul, Constantinople; After trials in Golden Horn laid up at Kasımpaşa; 1889 landed at Tersâne-i Âmire, Istanbul, Constantinople; 1921 scrapped.
Abdül Mecid (Abdülmecid I)	Des Vignes, Chertsey, London; LOA 30.5m, B 3.6m 100t (surface)/160t (submerged), Steel; 6kts (surface)/4kts (submerged); 7	Steam, 1 shaft 1 cyl., 8t coal 1 Lamm locomotive type, 250ihp 2xTT 360mm WH, 2x35mm MG N	23 Jan 1886 - 4 Aug 1887 -	Built as Nordenfelt 3 in section fitted by Tersâne-i Âmire, Istanbul, Constantinople; 4 Aug 1887 commissioned, laid up at Kasımpaşa; 1889 landed at Tersâne-i Âmire, Istanbul, Constantinople; 1921 scrapped.

=== Laubeuf type ===
Two submarines were ordered from in April 1914 Schneider-Laubeuf design to be delivered by December 1915.

=== E class ===
Two submarines were ordered on 29 April 1914 from Vickers and subcontracted by Vickers to Beardmore & Co. Materials prepared for them were used in the British submarines HMS E25 and HMS E26.

=== Müstecib Onbaşı ===
Name (Namesake)	Builder Dimensions Displacement, Hull Speed Complement	Machinery Boiler, Bunkers Engines Armament	Ordered Laid down Launched Trials	Commissioned Decommissioned Afterward
Müstecib Onbaşı (Corporal Müstecib)	Arsenal de Toulon, Toulon; L 44.9m, 3.9m, D 3.6m 393t (surface)/425t (submerged), Steel; 11kts (surface)/7kts (submerged); 1 officer, 5 rating (Nov. 1915)	Motorship, 2 shafts -, - 2 Sautter-Harlé diesel/electric motors, 600 bhp Unarmed	1907; 1908; 3 Aug 1908; 1908	1908 French Émeraude-class submarine Turquoise; 30 Oct 1915 grounded off Akbaş, captured by Ottoman forces or sunk by artillery fire 31 Oct 1915 floated 5 Nov 1915 arrived Istanbul; 10 Nov 1915 commissioned, renamed Müstacip Onbaşı; Stationary battery charge vessel for German U-boats; Oct. 1918 decommissioned 1 Jul 1919 returned to the French government 1921 broken up at Istanbul.

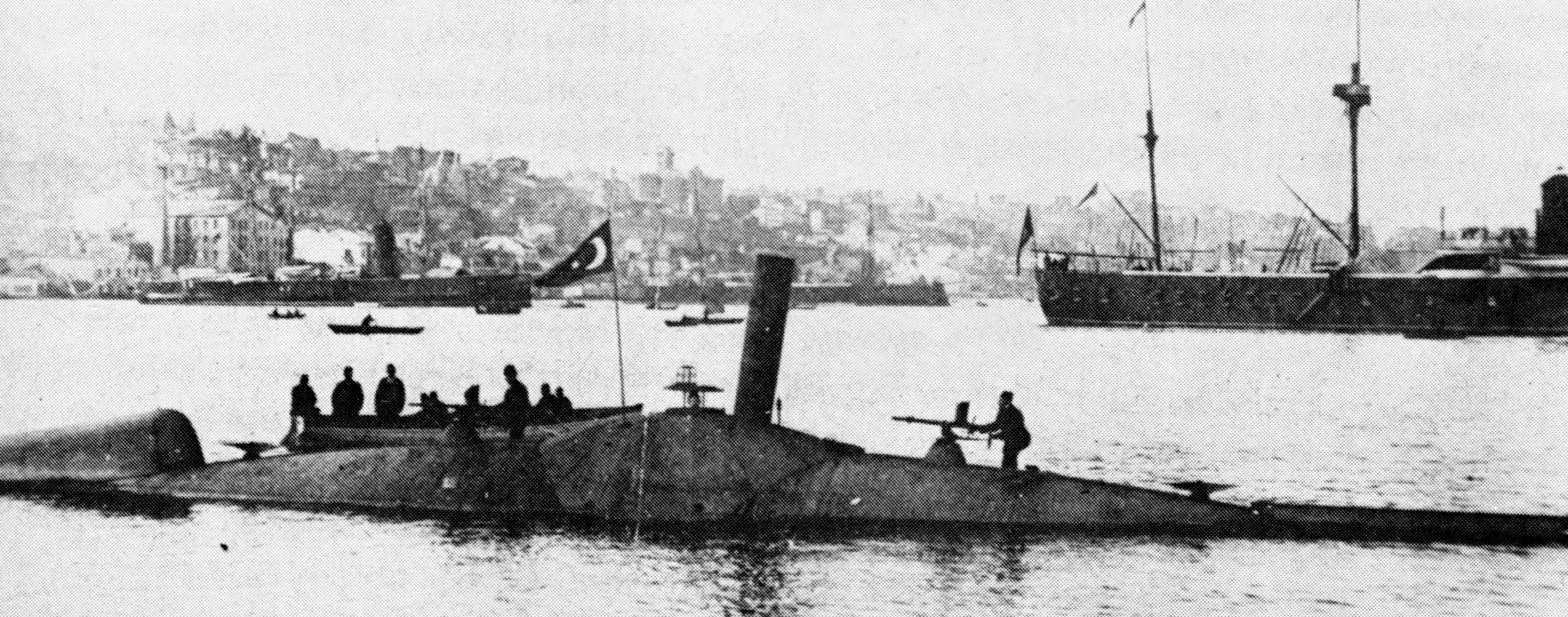
Abdülhamid (Taşkızak, Istanbul, 1896)

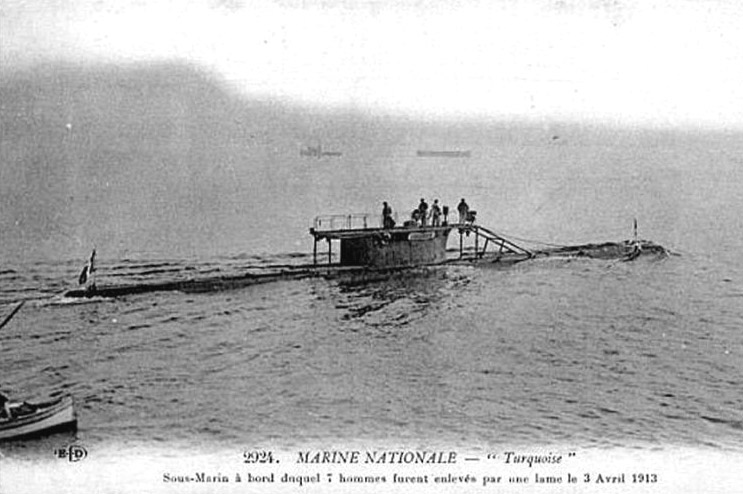
Turquoise (1908), 3 Apr 1913
