= Ottoman frigate Kervan-i Bahri =

History

Ottoman Empire
- Name: Kervan-i Bahri
- Ordered: 1852
- Builder: Imperial Arsenal, Constantinople
- Laid down: 1852
- Launched: 1853
- Commissioned: 1856
- Decommissioned: 1875
- Fate: Broken up, 1878

General characteristics
- Class & type: Steam frigate
- Tons burthen: 1,592 bm
- Length: 63.1 m (207 ft)
- Beam: 15.1 m (49 ft 6 in)
- Draft: 6.9 m (22 ft 8 in)
- Installed power: 2 × box boilers
- Propulsion: 1 × marine steam engine; 1 × screw
- Speed: 9 knots (17 km/h; 10 mph)
- Complement: 275
- Armament: 42 guns, unknown type

Kervan-i Bahri was a steam frigate of the Ottoman Navy that was built in the 1850s.

== Design ==
Kervan-i Bahri was 63.1 m (207 ft) long overall, with a beam of 15.1 m (49 ft 6 in) and a draft of 6.9 m (22 ft 8 in). Her hull was constructed with wood. Her tonnage was 1,592 tons burthen. She had a crew of 275 officers and enlisted men. The ship was armed with a battery of forty-two guns of unknown caliber arranged on the broadside.

She was propelled by a two-cylinder, direct-acting marine steam engine that drove a single screw propeller; the engine was manufactured by Robert Napier and Sons in Britain. Steam was provided by two coal-fired box boilers. Her propulsion system was rated for a top speed of 9 knots (17 km/h; 10 mph), though specific horsepower figures have not survived. Her coal storage capacity amounted to 250 metric tons (250 long tons; 280 short tons).

== Service history ==
Kervan-i Bahri was ordered in 1852 and was laid down at the Imperial Arsenal in Constantinople later that year. Her completed hull was launched in 1853, and fitting out was completed in 1856, less her engines. After being ship commissioning in early 1856, she sailed for Portsmouth, Britain, where her engine and boilers were installed. She sailed in company with the ship of the line Peyk-i Zafer, which was also to have propulsion machinery installed. The work on Kervan-i Bahri was completed by 22 May, when she departed to return home. The ship conducted initial sea trials in 1857.

In early 1866, the Cretan Revolt broke out on the island of Crete. Greek nationalists on the island sought independence from the Ottoman Empire and union with Greece. The Ottoman naval minister, Haci Mustafa Pasha, came aboard Kervan-i Bahri and sailed to Crete on 5 April 1867 to investigate the situation around the island. He decided to base a squadron in Preveza to blockade the island, but it was plagued with coal shortages. In 1868, the ship's propulsion system was removed, leaving her powered by sails alone; all but two of her guns were removed at that time as well. She was thereafter used as a transport vessel. The ship was decommissioned in 1875 and was broken up for scrap at the Imperial Arsenal in Constantinople three years later.
