= List of sail frigates of the Ottoman Empire =

This is a list of Ottoman Empire and allied sail and steam frigates of the period 1650-1867:
The guns listed are sometimes approximate as it's difficult to get accurate data for early Ottoman warships.

== Algiers Eyalet ==
- ? 37 - Spanish Nuestra Señora de Trapana
- El-Merikane 36 (1797, ex-Crescent) was built at Portsmouth, NH, as tribute for the Dey of Algiers and launched from the U.S. Navy Yard on 29 June 1797; stricken 1805
- Mashouda 46 (1802) Stephen Decatur, Jr, of the U.S. Navy, captured her in 1815; the U.S. returned her. She was sunk at Algiers 1816
- El-Portugaziye 36 (ex-Portuguese "N.a S.a do Bom Despacho, Cisne" (1779-1802; 36 guns), captured 1802 in the Mediterranean and sunk at Algiers during the Bombardment of Algiers (1816)
- Grande frigate 50 (1805) - Sunk at Algiers 1816
- El-Tunisiye 44 (1804, ex-Tunisian, obtained 1811) - Sunk at Algiers 1816
- El-Jazairiye 38 (1812) - ?
- ? 32 (ex-Moroccan El-Mansouriye, obtained 1817) - Storm 1822
- Rehber Iskender 40 (1818) - Egyptian 1830, stricken before 1836
- Meftah el-Jihad 46 (~1820?) - Egyptian 1830, stricken after 1838
- Bel Houaz/El-Touloniye (1822) - French 1830, BU 1830/31

== Tripolitania Eyalet ==
- ? 32 (ex-French, captured 1668)
- Looking Glass (34) - Burnt 1676
- Sancta Chiara (24) - Burnt 1676
- Philadelphia (36) – ex-USS Philadelphia, captured 1803; a U.S. naval boarding party under Lieutenant Stephen Decatur, Jr. set fire to her in 1804, destroying her

== Ottoman Empire ==
=== 17th century ===
- ? 34 - Captured by Venice 1660
- ? 25 - Captured by Venice 1660
- ? 30 - Captured by Venice 1662
- ? 24 - Captured by Venice 1662
- ? 36 (ex-French, captured 1668)
- ? 30 (ex-French, captured 1668)

=== 18th century ===
- (6 frigates) - Burnt at the Battle of Chesma 1770
- ? - Burnt 1772
- ? 30 - Burnt 1772
- (7 frigates) 30 - Burnt 1772
- ? 30 - Sunk 1772

=== Napoleonic era ===
- ? 28 (ex-French Brune, captured 1799)
- ? 40 (ex-French Justice, captured 1801)
- ? 40 - Aground and sunk 1807
- ? 36 - Aground and sunk 1807
- ? 36 - Aground and sunk 1807
- ? 32 - Aground and sunk 1807
- Uri Bahar (British Royal Navy (RN) version of the name; 40 guns) - The RN took possession of her on 21 March 1807 during the Alexandria expedition of 1807. Uri Bahar had twenty-eight 18-pounder guns on her upper deck, and six 8-pounder guns and six 18-pounder carronades on her QD and Fc. There is no record that the RN evere commissioned her. It disposed of her i in 1809.
- Uri Nasard (RN version of the name; 34 guns) - The RN took possession of her on 21 March 1807 during the Alexandria expedition of 1807. The Royal Navy commissioned Uri Nasard circa January 1808. Captain George Hony (or Honey) took command of Uri Nasard. She was armed with twenty-six 12-pounder guns on her upper deck, and eight 6-pounders (QD/Fc). The RN disposed of her in 1809. * * Meskeni-ghazi 50 (A) (Note: 2 or 3 of the 4 frigates marked (A) sank in 1807)
- Bedr-i Zafar 50 (A)
- Fakih-i Zafar 50 (A)
- Nessim 50 - Aground and burnt 1807
- Iskenderiye 44 (A)
- Badere Zafer/Bedr-i zafar 52 - HMS Seahorse captured her on 5/6 July 1808. In 1847 the Admiralty issued the clasp "Seahorse Wh. Badere Zaffere" to the Naval General Service Medal (1847) to surviving claimants from the action
- ? - Captured by Russia 1810
- Mahubey Subhan 40 - Captured by Russia 1811

=== Greek War of Independence ===
- ? - Wrecked 1822
- ? 54 - Burnt by fireship 1824
- Asia 44 - Burnt by fireship 1825
- ? 66 (possibly cut-down battleship) - Burnt by fireship 1825
- ? 64 (N) (Note: 13 ships marked (N) were at the Battle of Navarino in 1827 and correspond to the 16 vessels below (there are some repeats) but it is not known which is which) - Blew up during the Battle of Navarino 1827
- ? 56 (N) - Captured by the UK and blown up at the Battle of Navarino, 1827
- ? (N)
- ? (N)
- ? 52 (N)
- ? 64 (N) - Sunk during the Battle of Navarino 1827
- ? (N)
- ? (N)
- ? (N)
- "Conquerant" 56 (N) - Captured by Russia and blown up at the Battle of Navarino, 1827
- ? (N)
- "Grande Sultane" (N) - Captured by France at the Battle of Navarino 1827
- ? (N)

=== Ottoman frigates, 1829 ===
- Hıfz-ı Rahmân 60
- Feyz-i Mi'rac 48
- Keyvan-ı Bahrî 48
- Fevz-i Nusret 64
- Bandino Seret
- Mejra Zafer 48
- (10 ships) 42
- Nouhan Bahari 50
- M'sian Zafer 50
- Chabal Bahari 50
- Naoum Bahari 50
- ? - Captured by the UK 1840 (returned?)
- Diwân

Note that some of the later ships in this list may be repeats, due to bad transliteration.

=== Ottoman frigates, 1839 ===
Name	Built	Number of guns	Note
Muîn-i Rahmet	1828	40	
Avnillah	1832	50	
Yâver-i Tevfik	1832	32	
Suriye	1833	56	
Tâir-i Bahrî	1833	62	
Mirat-ı Zafer	1834	44	
Şihâb-ı Bahrî	1837	64	
Pîr-i Şevket	1837	58	
Nâvek-i Bahrî	1834	42	

=== Ottoman frigates, 1853 ===
Name	Built	Number of guns	Note
Nusretiye		60	
Reşid			
Avnillah	1832	50 or 36	Aground and burnt at the Battle of Sinop 1853
Nizâmiye		64 or 60	Burnt/blew up at the Battle of Sinop 1853
Nesîm-i Zafer		48 or 32	Aground and burnt at the Battle of Sinop 1853
Fazlullah	ex-Russian Rafail, captured 1829	48 or 38	Burnt/blew up at the Battle of Sinop 1853
Nâvek-i Bahrî	1834	42 or 52	Burnt/blew up at the Battle of Sinop 1853
Dimyâd		42 or 54	
Kâ'id-i Zafer		22 or 50	Survived the Battle of Navarino 1827, burnt/blew up at the Battle of Sinop 1853
Nacm-i Zafer		52	
Taif	1846	30	Steam frigate
Mecidiye	1846	30	Steam frigate
Saik-i Şadi	1847	30	Steam frigate
Feyzâ-i Bahrî	1848	30	Steam frigate
Mubir-i Sürur	1847	22	Steam frigate
Zır-i Cihat			
Serafeddin			
