= List of ship launches in 1847 =

The list of ship launches in 1847 includes a chronological list of some ships launched in 1847.

Date	Ship	Class	Builder	Location	Country	Notes
2 January	Ann Powell	Schooner	Messrs. John Dawson & Co.	Liverpool	United Kingdom	For private owner.
2 January	Oberon	Antelope-class sloop	Messrs. Rennie		United Kingdom	For Royal Navy.
2 January	Oliver Cromwell	Clipper	Messrs. Walter Hood & Co.	Aberdeen	United Kingdom	For private owner.
4 January	Aztic	Barque	Eccles	Newcastle upon Tyne	United Kingdom	For private owner.
4 January	Lord Haddo	Barque	Messrs. Lunan & Robertson	Peterhead	United Kingdom	For private owner.
4 January	Onyx	Schooner	Messrs. John Scott & Sons	Greenock	United Kingdom	For private owner.
5 January	Dauntless	Frigate	John Fincham	Portsmouth Dockyard	United Kingdom	For Royal Navy.
6 January	Bold Buccleuch	Steamship	Messrs. Smith & Rodger	Glasgow	United Kingdom	For private owner.
15 January	Isabella Hercus	Full-rigged ship	Messrs. Barr & Shearer	Ardrossan	United Kingdom	For Messrs. Thomas Hamilin & Co.
18 January	Hibernia	Snow	Sykes & Co	Sunderland	United Kingdom	For Nicholson & Co.
19 January	Jane Scott	Barque	Messrs. Menzies	Leith	United Kingdom	For Messrs. P. Henderson and Co.
20 January	The Royal Saxon	Barque	Messrs. Rose & Son	Leith	United Kingdom	For Messrs. Fleming.
21 January	William Edward	Brig	Messrs. Walter Hood & Co.	Aberdeen	United Kingdom	For private owner.
30 January	Livingston	Smack	Messrs. Denny & Rankin	Dumbarton	United Kingdom	For D. & J. Livingston.
30 January	Washington	Steamship		New York	United States	For United States Government.
1 February	Lochnagar	Barque	Pile	Monkwearmouth	United Kingdom	For John Wemyss & Co.
2 February	Pride of Erin	Paddle Steamer	Robert Napier and Sons	Govan	United Kingdom	For private owner.
4 February	Mary Anne	Schooner	Messrs. Furley & Co.	Gainsborough	United Kingdom	For private owner.
15 February	Sané	Steam frigate		Cherbourg	France	For French Navy.
18 February	Countess of Sefton	Full-rigged ship	Thomas Royden & Sons	Liverpool	United Kingdom	For Thomas Royden.
22 February	Allegheny	Steamship	Stackhouse and Tomlinson	Pittsburgh, Pennsylvania	United States	For United States Navy.
February	Charles Saunders	Full-rigged ship		Saint John	(United Kingdom of Great Britain and Ireland) Colony of New Brunswick	For private owner.
February	Eustace	Merchantman	L. T. Wang	Sunderland	United Kingdom	For Cooper & Co.
February	Mariner	Barque	R. H. Potts & Bros.	Sunderland	United Kingdom	For Shotton & Co.
3 March	Bombay	Steamship	Peter Cato & Co.	Liverpool	United Kingdom	For Bombay Steam Navigation Company.
3 March	Britannia	Ferry	Messrs. J. Hodgson & Co.	Liverpool	United Kingdom	For Messrs. E. & J. Willoughby.
3 March	Derwent	Snow	William Doxford & W. Crown	Sunderland	United Kingdom	For R. Storey.
9 March	Marchioness of Bredalbane	Steamship	Messrs. Denny Brothers	Dumbarton	United Kingdom	For Lochlomond Steamboat Company.
17 March	Dart	Brigantine		Sheerness Dockyard	United Kingdom	For Royal Navy.
19 March	Earl of Rosslyn	Steamship	Messrs. Smith & Rodgers	Govan	United Kingdom	For Robert Barclay & Mr. Greig.
19 March	Terpsichore	Arachne-class ship-sloop	Messrs. Wigrams	Blackwall	United Kingdom	For Royal Navy.
20 March	Guadalquiver	Steamship	Messrs. Thomas Vernon & Co.	Liverpool	United Kingdom	For private owner.
20 March	Sir George Pollock	Merchantman	Mould	Moulmein	Burma	For private owner.
28 March	Arachne	Arachne-class ship-sloop		Devonport Dockyard	United Kingdom	For Royal Navy.
31 March	Arab	Acorn-class brig-sloop		Chatham Dockyard	United Kingdom	For Royal Navy.
March	Rassitee Tidjaret	Steamship	Messrs. T. & J. White	Cowes	United Kingdom	For Ottoman Government.
March	Tasman	Merchantman		Hobart	(United Kingdom of Great Britain and Ireland) Van Diemen's Land	For private owner.
1 April	John Cobbold	Brigantine	William Bayley	Ipswich	United Kingdom	For William Bayley, John Cobbold and John Roper Sheppard.
3 April	Jane Pirrie	Full-rigged ship	Messrs. Duthie & Co.	Aberdeen	United Kingdom	For private owner.
10 April	The Look-out	Barque	W. Geddie	Garmouth	United Kingdom	For Robert Ross.
14 April	Némésis	Artémise-class frigate		Brest	France	For French Navy.
15 April	Melbourne	Full-rigged ship	W. H. Rowan & Co.	Kelvinhaugh	United Kingdom	For private owner.
15 April	Sybille	Pique-class frigate		Pembroke Dockyard	United Kingdom	For Royal Navy.
16 April	Alpha	Smack	Messrs. Christian & Evans	Port Madoc	United Kingdom	For private owner.
17 April	Echo	Yacht	Peter Cato & Co	Liverpool	United Kingdom	For private owner.
17 April	Tullamore	Steamship	Messrs. Wakefield Pym & Co.	Hull	United Kingdom	For private owner.
26 April	Cleopatra	Steamship	Messrs. Denny Bros.	Dumbarton	United Kingdom	For Dundee, Perth, and London Steam Shipping Company.
28 April	Faune	Brig-of-war		Brest	France	For French Navy.
April	Amana	Barque	J. Candlish	Sunderland	United Kingdom	For T. Oliver.
April	Harlequin	Brigantine		Bay of Fundy	(United Kingdom of Great Britain and Ireland) Unknown	For private owner.
April	John Murray	Schooner	J. Murray & Bros.	Sunderland	United Kingdom	For Murray & Co.
April	Water Wyvern	Cutter yacht		Dublin	United Kingdom	For private owner.
April	Zenobia	Brig		Digby	(United Kingdom of Great Britain and Ireland) Colony of Nova Scotia	For private owner.
1 May	Phœnecian	Barque	Messrs. Walter Wood & Co.	Aberdeen	United Kingdom	For private owner.
1 May	Zion	Barque	Messrs. Trotter & Young	Howdon	United Kingdom	For James Miller.
13 May	America	America-class steamship	Robert Steele & Company	Greenock	United Kingdom	For British and North American Royal Mail Steam Packet Company.
13 May	Victoria	Schooner	A. Hall & Sons	Aberdeen	United Kingdom	For Leith and Hamburg Shipping Company.
15 May	Earl of Aberdeen	Paddle steamer	Robert Napier and Sons	Govan	United Kingdom	For Aberdeen Steam Navigation Company.
15 May	Kayman	Schooner yacht	Inman	Lymington	United Kingdom	For Marquess of Ailsa.
15 May	Margaret Milne	Barque	Andrew Leslie & Co.	Aberdeen	United Kingdom	For private owner.
15 May	Shamrock	Steamship	Messrs. Caird & Co.	Greenock	United Kingdom	For Glasgow & Londonderry Steam Packet Company.
17 May	John Paley	Schooner	Speakman	Preston	United Kingdom	For private owner.
22 May	The Port	Schooner	Messrs. Brundett and Whiteway	Liverpool	United Kingdom	For private owner.
27 May	Ripley	Schooner	J. H. Robson	Sunderland	United Kingdom	For J. Myers.
31 May	Camperdown	Barque	James Laing	Sunderland	United Kingdom	For Duncan Dunbar.
May	Argo	Full-rigged ship		Saint John	(United Kingdom of Great Britain and Ireland) Colony of New Brunswick	For private owner.
May	Brother & Sister	Schooner	G. Murray & T. Nesbitt	Sunderland	United Kingdom	For Mr. Forsyth.
May	Conqueror	Merchantman	Rogerson	South Hylton	United Kingdom	For J. Charlton.
May	Helena	Barque		Perth	United Kingdom	For Messrs. Baxter Bros & Co.
May	Sea Nymph	Merchantman	Austin & Mills	Sunderland	United Kingdom	For Austin & Mills.
1 June	Trafalgar	Steamship	Messrs. Tod & McGregor	Kelvinhaugh	United Kingdom	For Peninsular and Oriental Steam Navigation Company.
1 June	Viola	Brig	Messrs. Miller & Co.	Liverpool	United Kingdom	For private owner.
2 June	Britomart	Brig		Pembroke Dockyard	United Kingdom	For Royal Navy.
5 June	Northman	Steamship	Messrs. Denny Bros.	Dumbarton	United Kingdom	For private owner.
12 June	Ocean Monarch	Packet ship		East Boston, Massachusetts	United States	For Train Line.
12 June	Mary	Snow	Hylton Carr	Hylton	United Kingdom	For Mr. Rickenson.
12 June	Rose	Schooner	William Robinson	Sunderland	United Kingdom	For Mr. Kirkwood.
12 June	Siren	Barque	Robert Thompson & Sons	Sunderland	United Kingdom	For Ogle & Cp.
14 June	Louisa	Snow	William Naizby	Hylton Ferry	United Kingdom	For private owner.
15 June	Britannia	Barque	R. H. Potts & Bros.	Sunderland	United Kingdom	For Potts Bros.
15 June	Eliza Robson	Snow	William Doxford & W. Crown	Sunderland	United Kingdom	For Gray & Co.
15 June	Fanny	Barque	William Harkass	North Sand	United Kingdom	For Ralph Hutchinson.
15 June	Free Trade	Steamship	Messrs. Green's	Blackwall	United Kingdom	For Continental Cattle Company.
15 June	Sutlej	East Indiaman	Messrs. Green's	Blackwall	United Kingdom	For private owner.
18 June	Geelong	Barque	Messrs. William Hood, Rowan & Co.	Kelvinhaugh	United Kingdom	For private owner.
25 June	Khrabryi	Khrabryi-class ship of the line	S. I. Chernyavskiy		Russia	For Imperial Russian Navy.
28 June	Blessing	Merchantman	Lister & Bartram	North Hylton	United Kingdom	For Lister & Co.
28 June	Jane	Snow	Lawson Gales	Hylton	United Kingdom	For Mr. Davison.
28 June	Persévérante	Frigate		Brest	France	For French Navy.
29 June	Mercury	Snow	Todd & Brown	Hylton	United Kingdom	For Pounder & Co.
29 June	Union	Barque	J. Mearns	Sunderland	United Kingdom	For Mr. Hick.
30 June	Frances Ridley	Full-rigged ship	Vaux	Northam	United Kingdom	For Mr. Ridley.
30 June	St. Columba	Frigate	John Laird	North Birkenhead	United Kingdom	For Royal Navy.
30 June	The Snake	Schooner	William Read	Ipswich	United Kingdom	For Travers & Co.
June	James Watt	Merchantman	L. T. Wang	Sunderland	United Kingdom	For Waite & Co.
June	Pausilippo	Yacht			United Kingdom	For private owner.
June	Proserpine	Schooner yacht	Read	Ipswich	United Kingdom	For George Anson Byron.
1 July	Shealtiel	Snow	J. Rodgerson	South Hylton	United Kingdom	For Heasman & Co.
1 July	The Lion	Steamship	Messrs. Smith & Rogers	Govan	United Kingdom	For private owner.
1 July	Victory	Barque	William Wilkinson	Sunderland	United Kingdom	For Nichol & Co.
5 July	Cardoc	Paddle Gunboat	Messrs. Ditchburn & Mare	Blackwall	United Kingdom	For Royal Navy.
8 July	Mary Anne Folliott	Full-rigged ship	William Jones	Pwllheli	United Kingdom	For Messrs. J. J. Melhuish & Co.
13 July	Ann Proud	Snow	Wilson Chilton	Sunderland	United Kingdom	For Purdy & Co.
14 July	Coromandel	Full-rigged ship	Messrs. Lunnan & Robertson	Peterhead	United Kingdom	For Mr. Mitchell.
19 July	James Chadwick	Brig	Messrs. Duthie	Footdee	United Kingdom	For private owner.
28 July	Renommée	Didon-class frigate		Rochefort	France	For French Navy.
28 July	Niagara	Steamship	Messrs. Robert Steele & Co.	Greenock	United Kingdom	For British and North American Royal Mail Steam Packet Company.
28 July	The Land o' Cakes	Clipper	Adamson	Grangemouth	United Kingdom	For Messrs. Adamson.
28 July	Torrance	Full-rigged ship	Messrs. William Simons & Co	Greenock	United Kingdom	For James Pinkerton Sr.
29 July	Lion	Vanguard-class ship of the line		Pembroke Dockyard	United Kingdom	For Royal Navy.
29 July	Zenobie	Frigate		Toulon	United Kingdom	For French Navy.
30 July	Clauchloudoun	Sloop	John Hannah	Garlieston	United Kingdom	For Cree Navigation Company.
July	Cotfield	Barque	builder	Sunderland	United Kingdom	For E. Graham.
July	Ocean Monarch	Barque	Donald McKay	East Boston, Massachusetts	United States	For White Diamond Line.
July	Plenty	Barque			(United Kingdom of Great Britain and Ireland) Colony of Prince Edward Island	For private owner.
6 August	Ann Maclean	Barque	Messrs. Barr & Shearer	Ardrossan	United Kingdom	For private owner.
6 August	Dawn	Merchantman	T. Forsyth	South Shields	United Kingdom	For private owner.
6 August	Loharee	East Indiaman		South Shields	United Kingdom	For private owner.
6 August	Monkey	Schooner	Messrs. BArr & Shearer	Ardrossan	United Kingdom	For private owner.
15 August	Tage	Hercule-class ship of the line	Brest Shipyard	Brest	France	For French Navy.
17 August	Lafayette	Steamship		New York	United States	For private owner.
25 August	Héliopolis	Frigate		Lorient	France	For French Navy.
27 August	Garland	Sloop	Richard Price	Caernarfon	United Kingdom	For T. Turner and others.
28 August	Bayard	Suffren-class ship of the line	Pierre Thomeuf	Lorient	France	For French Navy.
28 August	Endymion	Merchantman	Messrs. Chaloner & Sons	Liverpool	United Kingdom	For Messrs. Coatesworth, Wynne & Co.
28 August	Mersey	Pilot boat	Royden	Liverpool	United Kingdom	For private owner.
28 August	Mayville	Clipper	Messrs. L. Rose & Son	location	United Kingdom	For Messrs. John Mitchell & Co.
August	Adept	Full-rigged ship		Quebec	(United Kingdom of Great Britain and Ireland) Province of Canada	For Messrs. Pollock, Gilmour & Co.
August	Brierly Hill	Snow	Austin & Mills	Sunderland	United Kingdom	For S. & J. Pegg.
August	Clarinda	Snow	John Robinson	Sunderland	United Kingdom	For Ogle & Co.
August	Free Trader	Barque			(United Kingdom of Great Britain and Ireland) Colony of Prince Edward Island	For private owner.
August	Lord Elgin	Barque		Bathurst	(United Kingdom of Great Britain and Ireland) Colony of New Brunswick	For private owner.
August	Rapid	Merchantman	S. & P. Austin	Sunderland	United Kingdom	For Crosby & Co.
8 September	Camilla	Helena-class brig		location	United Kingdom	For Royal Navy.
8 September	Ranger	Brig	William Anderson	Arbroath	United Kingdom	For George Gleig.
11 September	Jane Gibson	Schooner	McMillan	Greenock	United Kingdom	For Mr. Gibson and others.
14 September	Scotia	Paddle steamer	Money and Wigrams, Blackwall Yard	Blackwall	United Kingdom	For Chester and Holyhead Railway.
15 September	Lina	Brig	Messrs. Charles Connell & Sons	Belfast	United Kingdom	For Messrs. Sinclair & Boyd.
16 September	William Bartlett	Schooner	Webster	Fraserburgh	United Kingdom	For private owner.
18 September	Ivanhoe	Packet ship		New York	United States	For Black Star Line.
21 September	Ann Hood	Barque	Messrs. William Hood, Rowan & Co.	Kelvinhaugh	United Kingdom	For private owner.
23 September	Prony	Corvette			France	For French Navy.
25 September	Mary Beynon	Barque	Messrs. Westacott	Barnstaple	United Kingdom	For John Beynon.
25 September	Termagant	Termagant-class frigate		Deptford Dockyard	United Kingdom	For Royal Navy.
25 September	Valmy	First rate	Brest Shipyard	Brest	France	For French Navy.
25 September	Wallasey	Steamship	J. Sothern	Egremont	United Kingdom	For private owner.
27 September	Cumberland	Steamship	Messrs Tod & McGregor	Glasgow	United Kingdom	For private owner.
27 September	Elk	Acorn-class brig-sloop		Chatham Dockyard	United Kingdom	For Royal Navy.
27 September	Europa	Steamship	John Wood	Port Glasgow	United Kingdom	For British and North American Royal Mail Steam Ship Company.
27 September	Heron	Acorn-class brig-sloop		Chatham Dockyard	United Kingdom	For Royal Navy.
27 September	Lady Dyna	Full-rigged ship	Messrs. Charles Smith & Son	Willington Quay	United Kingdom	For private owner.
30 September	Hermann	Steamship	Messrs. Westerveldt & Mackey	New York	United States	For United States Line, or New York and Bremen Line.
September	Kezia	Merchantman	Forrest & Co.	Sunderland	United Kingdom	For J. Hay.
September	Susan	Barque			United Kingdom	For private owner.
2 October	Salamandre	Paddle aviso		Toulon	France	For French Navy.
8 October	Atalanta	Brig		Pembroke Dockyard	United Kingdom	For Royal Navy.
9 October	Thames	Schooner	Messrs. Duthie	Footdee	United Kingdom	For private owner.
11 October	Curlew	Merchantman	R. H. Potts & Bros.	Sunderland	United Kingdom	For Potts & Co.
11 October	England's Queen	Barquentine	Richard Wilkinson	Sunderland	United Kingdom	For A. Ridley.
11 October	Isadora	Merchantman	J. Rodgerson	Hylton Ferry	United Kingdom	For Mr. Charleton.
12 October	Seagull	Paddle steamer	Messrs. Coates & Young	Belfast	United Kingdom	For private owner.
13 October	Banshee	Steamship	Thompson	Deptford	United Kingdom	For Royal Navy.
13 October	Countess of Carlisle	Full-rigged ship	Messrs. Humphrey & Co.	Hull	United Kingdom	For private owner.
13 October	Jet	Brig	Hobkirk	Whitby	United Kingdom	For Messrs. Flintoft and Lister.
25 October	Ganges	Merchantman	Messrs. Menzies & Co.	Leith	United Kingdom	For private owner.
27 October	Hibernia	Paddle steamer	Thomas Vernon	Liverpool	United Kingdom	For Chester and Holyhead Railway.
October	Dumbarton Youth	Steamship	Messrs. Denny Bros.	Dumbarton	United Kingdom	For private owner.
October	Lord Dalhousie	Full-rigged ship	T. Gales	Sunderland	United Kingdom	For private owner.
October	Venezia	Steamship		Trieste	Austria	For Österreichischer Lloyd.
1 November	Invincible	Barque	Messrs. Young & Cook	Pillgwenly	United Kingdom	For William Webb.
4 November	Peterel	Yacht	Winram	Douglas	Isle of Man	For Mr. Brockale.
10 November	Herbert	Schooner	John Thomas	Nevin	United Kingdom	For private owner.
11 November	Cordelia	Merchantman	Barber	Great Yarmouth	United Kingdom	For James Clarke.
12 November	Marvel	Merchantman	Messrs. Folletts	Dartmouth	United Kingdom	For private owner.
18 November	Saxon	Barque	Lister & Bartram	Hylton Ferry	United Kingdom	For Mr. Corrigall.
23 November	Empress	Clipper	Messrs. P. Chaloner & Sons	Liverpool	United Kingdom	For Messrs. Cotesworth, Wynne & Co.
23 November	Marli	Barque	John Duncanson	Alloa	United Kingdom	For Messrs. Thomas Duncan & Son.
25 November	Pons Ælie	Merchantman	Messrs. Trotter & Young	Howdon	United Kingdom	For private owner.
1 December	HSwMS Gefle	Steam corvette	Karlskrona Naval Yard	Karlskrona	Sweden	For the Swedish Navy.
11 December	Malta	Paddle steamer	Messrs. Caird & Co.	Greenock	United Kingdom	For Peninsular and Oriental Steam Navigation Company.
22 December	Whitehaven	Steamship	Messrs. Thomas Vernon and Son	Liverpool	United Kingdom	For Whitehaven Steam Navigation Company.
23 December	Dom Afonso	Paddle frigate	Thomas Royden & Sons	Liverpool	United Kingdom	For Imperial Brazilian Navy.
31 December	Midas	Merchantman		Aberdovey	United Kingdom	For Robert Edwards.
December	Ant	Lighter	W. Hay	Sunderland	United Kingdom	For W. Hay.
December	Bee	Lighter	W. Hay	Sunderland	United Kingdom	For W. Hay.
December	Fly	Lighter	W. Hay	Sunderland	United Kingdom	For W. Hay.
December	Wasp	Lighter	W. Hay	Sunderland	United Kingdom	For W. Hay.
Spring	Argo	Brigantine		Pictou	(United Kingdom of Great Britain and Ireland) Colony of Nova Scotia	For private owner.
Spring	Ringfield	Full-rigged ship	Messrs. G. H. Parke & Co	Quebec	(United Kingdom of Great Britain and Ireland) Province of Canada	For private owner.
Spring	Riverdale	Full-rigged ship	Messrs. G. H. Parke & Co	Quebec	(United Kingdom of Great Britain and Ireland) Province of Canada	For private owner.
Unknown date	Abeona	Barque	T. & B. Tiffin	Sunderland	United Kingdom	For Mr. Dryden.
Unknown date	Ada Mary	Snow	Buchanan & Gibson	Sunderland	United Kingdom	For Moore & Co.
Unknown date	Aid	Sloop		Sunderland	United Kingdom	For private owner.
Unknown date	Aid	Snow	G. W. & W. J. Hall	Sunderland	United Kingdom	For Surtees & Co.
Unknown date	Alfred	Snow		Sunderland	United Kingdom	For Baker & Co.
Unknown date	Allandale	Barque		Sunderland	United Kingdom	For W. Lindsay.
Unknown date	Alpha	Schooner	Sanderson & Co	Sunderland	United Kingdom	For Pearce & Co.
Unknown date	Anglia	Paddle steamer	Ditchburn and Mare	Blackwall	United Kingdom	For Chester and Holyhead Railway.
Unknown date	Artemisia	Barquentine		Sunderland, County Durham	United Kingdom	For A. Ridley.
Unknown date	Ann	Snow	B. Hodgson & Co.	Sunderland	United Kingdom	For Ogle & Douglas.
Unknown date	Anna Mary	Barque	W. & J. Pile	Sunderland	United Kingdom	For private owner.
Unknown date	Ann & John	Snow	Bowman and Drummond	Blyth	United Kingdom	For Mr. Crawford.
Unknown date	Anns	Schooner	John Davison	Sunderland	United Kingdom	For Mr. Kirkley.
Unknown date	Ann Stainton	Merchantman	J. Rodgerson	South Hylton	United Kingdom	For Thomas Stainton.
Unknown date	Arno	Barque	W. Wilkinson	Sunderland	United Kingdom	For Moon & Co.
Unknown date	Aspern	Schooner	G. W. & W. J. Hall	Sunderland	United Kingdom	For Moore, Hall & Co.
Unknown date	Astoria	Barque	W. R. Abbay	Sunderland	United Kingdom	For Mr. Collison.
Unknown date	Augusta	Brigantine		New Kent County, Virginia	United States	For Henry Grinnell.
Unknown date	Aurora	Steamship	Bishop & Simonson	New York	United Kingdom	For Sidney Mason & William D. Thompson.
Unknown date	Australasia	Barque	James Laingv	Sunderland	United Kingdom	For Riddell & Co.
Unknown date	Automatia	Snow	J. Barkes	Sunderland	United Kingdom	For Mr. Blyth.
Unknown date	Azoff	Merchantman	J. Rodgerson	South Hylton	United Kingdom	For private owner.
Unknown date	Cairngorm	Schooner	William Petrie	Sunderland	United Kingdom	For W. Petrie.
Unknown date	Cambria	Snow	W. Byers	Sunderland	United Kingdom	For Lumsdon & Parker.
Unknown date	Caroline Agnes	Full-rigged ship	J. Stobart	Sunderland	United Kingdom	For private owner.
Unknown date	Caroline Frances	Snow	Edward Brown	North Hylton	United Kingdom	For Thomas Wood.
Unknown date	Collingwood	Barque		Sunderland	United Kingdom	For Duncan Dunbar.
Unknown date	Colonist	Barque	W. Naizby	South Hylton	United Kingdom	For Mr. Coulson.
Unknown date	Constance	Barque	Sykes & Co	Coxgreen	United Kingdom	For T. Blair.
Unknown date	Constantine	Barque		River Blackwagter	United Kingdom	For private owner.
Unknown date	Contest	Sloop	William Bonker	Salcombe	United Kingdom	For Robert Hurrell and others.
Unknown date	Cornhill	Barque	W. H. Pearson	Sunderland	United Kingdom	For Sandius & Co.
Unknown date	Duke of Sutherland	Paddle steamer	Robert Napier and Sons	Govan	United Kingdom	For private owner.
Unknown date	Ebenezer	Schooner	Bowman and Drummond	Blyth	United Kingdom	For Stafford & Co.
Unknown date	Economy	Merchantman	W. Spowers	Sunderland	United Kingdom	For Mr. Hopper.
Unknown date	Effort	Barque	Elliott & Newton	Sunderland	United Kingdom	For Mr Collinson.
Unknown date	Egypt	Barque	W. Naizby	South Hylton	United Kingdom	For Mr. Thompson.
Unknown date	Eleanor	Schooner			United Kingdom	For private owner.
Unknown date	Eleanors	Snow	W. Carr	Sunderland	United Kingdom	For private owner.
Unknown date	Electra	Full-rigged ship			United States	For United States Navy.
Unknown date	Elizabeth	Shooner	W. & J. Robinson	Sunderland	United Kingdom	For Mr. Harrison.
Unknown date	Elizabeth	Snow	Lister	Sunderland	United Kingdom	For R. Wetherly & J. Cantor.
Unknown date	Ellen Simpson	Barque	Lawson Gales	Hylton	United Kingdom	For Mr. Newman.
Unknown date	Emily	Schooner	Forrest & Co.	Sunderland	United Kingdom	For Mr. Smurthwaite.
Unknown date	Emma Sarah	Snow	W. Sanderson	Sunderland	United Kingdom	For J. Barry & J. Hemsley.
Unknown date	Emmaus	Sloop	J. Watson	Sunderland	United Kingdom	For G. & E. Robinson.
Unknown date	Empress	Snow	R. Greenwell	Sunderland	United Kingdom	For Richard Newman.
Unknown date	Empress	Barque	J. Watson	Sunderland	United Kingdom	For Roddam & Co.
Unknown date	Endeavour	Barque	W. H. Pearson	Sunderland	United Kingdom	For Mr. Glaholm.
Unknown date	Etna	Full-rigged ship			United States	For United States Navy.
Unknown date	Euphrosyne	Barque	John Watson	Sunderland	United Kingdom	For Barras & Co.
Unknown date	Fairy Polka	Schooner	D. P. Walker	Emsworth	United Kingdom	For D. P. Walker.
Unknown date	Fancy	Snow	R. Wilkinson	Sunderland	United Kingdom	For J. Tully & N. Coward.
Unknown date	Fanny Mitcheson	Snow	W. Byers	Sunderland	United Kingdom	For Mr. Mitcheson.
Unknown date	George Hudson	Snow	J. Barkes	Sunderland	United Kingdom	For S. G. Morton.
Unknown date	Germanie	Steamship		Trieste	Austria	For private owner.
Unknown date	Gipsy	Barque	G. Worthy	Sunderland	United Kingdom	For private owner.
Unknown date	Gulterus	Snow	J. Barkes	Sunderland	United Kingdom	For Mr. Ledbitter.
Unknown date	Happy Return	Schooner	W. Henzell	Seaham	United Kingdom	For Mr. Hensall.
Unknown date	Heatherbell	Snow	Bowman and Drummond	Blyth	United Kingdom	For Marshall Twedell.
Unknown date	Helena	Barque	J. Hardie & M. Clark	Sunderland	United Kingdom	For Mr. Thompson.
Unknown date	Henry & Ann	Schooner	E. Potts	Seaham	United Kingdom	For W. Mackie.
Unknown date	Henry Andrew	Brig		New York City	United States	For private owner.
Unknown date	Herald	Barque	W. R. Abbay	Sunderland	United Kingdom	For J. Lidgett.
Unknown date	Honor	Barque	Todd & Brown	Hylton	United Kingdom	For Weare & Co.
Unknown date	Hope	Barque	R. Wikinson	Sunderland	United Kingdom	For private owner.
Unknown date	Horatio	Snow	J. Candlish	Sunderland	United Kingdom	For private owner.
Unknown date	Industry	Snow	Robert Thompson & Sons	Sunderland	United Kingdom	For Mr. Huntley.
Unknown date	Iris	Paddle steamer		New York City	United States	For private owner.
Unknown date	Isaac Wright	Packet ship	W. H. Webb	New York	United States	For Old Black Ball Line.
Unknown date	James Dowell	Schooner		Sunderland	United Kingdom	For M. Redhead.
Unknown date	James Lumsden	Barque	W. & J. Pile	Sunderland	United Kingdom	For Potter & Co.
Unknown date	Jenny Lind	Barque	B. Hodgson & Co.	Sunderland	United Kingdom	For private owner.
Unknown date	Jessie	Schooner	Robert Thompson & Sons	Sunderland	United Kingdom	For Ogle & Douglas.
Unknown date	John Harrison	Merchantman	G. Rowell	Sunderland	United Kingdom	For Rowell & Co.
Unknown date	Juliana	Barque	Buchanan & Gisbon	Sunderland	United Kingdom	For Clay & Co.
Unknown date	Julindur	Full-rigged ship	James Crown	Southwick	United Kingdom	For E. Arthur.
Unknown date	Kate	Snow	W. Carr	Sunderland	United Kingdom	For private owner.
Unknown date	Kent	full-rigged ship	John Watson	Sunderland	United Kingdom	For private owner.
Unknown date	Kingfisher	Barque	Austin & Mills	Sunderland	United Kingdom	For W. Snowball.
Unknown date	Laban	Barque	Sykes & Co	Sunderland	United Kingdom	For W. Brass & J. Stanes.
Unknown date	Lady Denison	Barque		Port Arthur	(United Kingdom of Great Britain and Ireland) Van Diemen's Land	For Nathan, Moses and Company.
Unknown date	Lady Peel	Snow	Edward Brown	Sunderland	United Kingdom	For H. Eggleston, W. Eggleston & R. Ayre.
Unknown date	Limehouse	Barque	builder	Sunderland	United Kingdom	For Mr. Mitcheson.
Unknown date	L'Italie	Steamship		Trieste	Austria	For private owner.
Unknown date	Loch in Dahl	Schooner	W. & J. Pile	Sunderland	United Kingdom	For Mr. Lawson.
Unknown date	Madalina Grenfell	Barque	W. Reed	Sunderland	United Kingdom	For W. Nicholson & Sons.
Unknown date	Mangosteen	Barque	John Watson	Sunderland	United Kingdom	For Mr. Thompson.
Unknown date	Margaret West	Barque	R. Wilkinson	Sunderland	United Kingdom	For private owner.
Unknown date	Mary	Barque	G. Spowers	Sunderland	United Kingdom	For H. Smith.
Unknown date	Mary & Jane	Schooner	Gibson & Chambers	Sunderland	United Kingdom	For J. Gibson & J. Proud.
Unknown date	Mary Ann	Schooner	J. Hardie & M. Clark	Sunderland	United Kingdom	For Mary Bamborough.
Unknown date	Mary Ann	Snow	T. Sanderson	Sunderland	United Kingdom	For W. Harty.
Unknown date	Mary Bentley	Snow	W. Carr	Sunderland	United Kingdom	For J. Reed.
Unknown date	Mary Clarke	Snow	J. Hardie & M. Clark	Sunderland	United Kingdom	For Clarke & Co.
Unknown date	Mary Jane	Schooner	W. Yule & Bros.	Sunderland	United Kingdom	For private owner.
Unknown date	Mary Stewart	Barque		Sunderland	United Kingdom	For W. Lindsay.
Unknown date	May Queen	Barque	L. T. Wang	Sunderland	United Kingdom	For Wang & Co.
Unknown date	Mead	Snow	Robert Thompson & Sons	Sunderland	United Kingdom	For private owner.
Unknown date	Minden	Snow	T. Stonehouse	Sunderland	United Kingdom	For Woods & Co.
Unknown date	Mount Etna	Snow	B. Hodgson & Co.	Sunderland	United Kingdom	For Ogle & Douglas.
Unknown date	Nerbudda	Barque	Austin & Mills	Sunderland	United Kingdom	For Mr. Crawford.
Unknown date	New Commercial	Snow	Peter Austin	Sunderland	United Kingdom	For T. Wilson.
Unknown date	New Star	Paddle steamer	Miller & Ravenhill	Blackwall	United Kingdom	For private owner.
Unknown date	Nikolai	Survey vessel	Mertvago	Orenburg	Russia	For Imperial Russian Navy.
Unknown date	Nizam	Barque	J. Mearns	Sunderland	United Kingdom	For T. Blair, G. Spark & T. Ogden.
Unknown date	Northerner	Paddle steamer	William H. Brown	New York City	United States	For Spofford & Tileston.
Unknown date	Nymph	Snow	William Robinson	Sunderland	United Kingdom	For T. Austin.
Unknown date	Ocean	Paddle steamer		Algiers, Louisiana	United States	For private owner.
Unknown date	Ocean	Barque	W. H. Pearson	Sunderland	United Kingdom	For Mr. Dryden.
Unknown date	Olivia	Snow	W. Sanderson	Sunderland	United Kingdom	For Wilson & Co.
Unknown date	Orion	Paddle steamer	Caird & Co	Greenock	United Kingdom	For private owner.
Unknown date	Paul Pry	Paddle tug	John Bond	Millwall	United Kingdom	For William Watkins Ltd.
Unknown date	Pearl	Barque	L. T. Wang	South Southwick	United Kingdom	For Ord & Co.
Unknown date	Platoff	Snow	William Robinson	Sunderland	United Kingdom	For R. Wood.
Unknown date	Precursor	Snow	Robert Thompson & Sons	Sunderland	United Kingdom	For Joseph Culliford.
Unknown date	Railway King	Snow	W. & J. Robinson	Sunderland	United Kingdom	For R. Brown.
Unknown date	Rebecca	Barque	W. Wilkinson	Sunderland	United Kingdom	For Scott & Wilkinson.
Unknown date	Rival	Barque	W. & J. Pile	Sunderland	United Kingdom	For private owner.
Unknown date	Saik-i Şadi	Mecidiye-class frigate	Tersâne-i Âmire	Constantinople	Ottoman Empire	For Ottoman Navy.
Unknown date	Salonica	Merchantman	R. Thompson	Sunderland	United Kingdom	For Mr. Anderson.
Unknown date	Salus	Merchantman	Wilson Chilton	Sunderland	United Kingdom	For J. Alcock.
Unknown date	Salus	Snow	J. T. Alcock	Sunderland	United Kingdom	For private owner.
Unknown date	Samuel Russell	Clipper	Brown & Bell	New York	United States	For A. A. Low & Brother.
Unknown date	Santa Maura	Barque	Candlish & Co.	Sunderland	United Kingdom	For Woods, Spence & Co.
Unknown date	Sarah	Snow	John & J. P. Murray	Sunderland	United Kingdom	For Ray & Co.
Unknown date	Sarkiye	Frigate	Tersâne-i Âmire	Constantinople	Ottoman Empire	For Ottoman Navy.
Unknown date	Schorpioen	Full-rigged ship		Vlissingen	Netherlands	For Royal Netherlands Navy.
Unknown date	Scythian	Schooner	W. & J. Pile	Sunderland	United Kingdom	For Burrell & Co.
Unknown date	Secret	Barque	R. Hutchinson	Sunderland	United Kingdom	For R. Hutchinson.
Unknown date	Simon Magnus	Snow	W. Carr	Sunderland	United Kingdom	For Magnus & Co.
Unknown date	Sir Edward Perry	Barque	J. Stobart	Sunderland	United Kingdom	For Gilmore & Co.
Unknown date	Sir Thomas Gresham	Full-rigged ship	T. Gales	Sunderland	United Kingdom	For Lidgett & Co.
Unknown date	South Esk	Snow	W. & J. Pile	Sunderland	United Kingdom	For Lindsay & Co.
Unknown date	Sprite	Merchantman	Ralph Hutchinson	Sunderland	United Kingdom	For W. Briggs.
Unknown date	Steadfast	Barque	G. W. & W. J. Hall	Sunderland	United Kingdom	For Mr. Temperley.
Unknown date	Syria	Barque	W. Petrie	Sunderland	United Kingdom	For T. Hay.
Unknown date	Syrophenecian	Barque	G. Worthy	Sunderland	United Kingdom	For T. Hansell.
Unknown date	Talbot	Steamship			United Kingdom	For private owner.
Unknown date	Tarantul	Zmeia-class schooner	Arsenal de Caracca	Cádiz	Spain	For Imperial Russian Navy.
Unknown date	Thankful	Schooner	W. Carr	Sunderland	United Kingdom	For McDonale & Gale.
Unknown date	The Brothers	Paddle steamer	Thomas Chownew	Pyrmont	(United Kingdom of Great Britain and Ireland) New South Wales	For John and Joseph Gerard.
Unknown date	The Port	Schooner	Brundrit & Whiteway	Runcorn	United Kingdom	For Brundrit & Whiteway.
Unknown date	Thomas	Snow	W. Spowers & Co.	Sunderland	United Kingdom	For Mr. Standering.
Unknown date	Thomas Chodwick	Barque	Ralph & William Hutchinson	Panns	United Kingdom	For T. Chodwick.
Unknown date	Times	Barque	J. Robinson	Sunderland	United Kingdom	For Mr. Thompson.
Unknown date	Torrington	Brig			(United Kingdom of Great Britain and Ireland) Colony of Nova Scotia	For J. Peacock.
Unknown date	Victory	Barque	James Leithead	Sunderland	United Kingdom	For Fenwick & Co.
Unknown date	Vision	Schooner	R. Wright	Sunderland	United Kingdom	For R. Wright.
Unknown date	Walter Morrice	Barque	Lawson Gales	Hylton	United Kingdom	For Halket & Co.
Unknown date	Walter Kelpie	Snow	J. Hardie & M. Clark	Sunderland	United Kingdom	For Briggs & Co.
Unknown date	Wellington	Barque	James Leithead	Sunderland	United Kingdom	For Mr. Fenwick.
Unknown date	West Point	Full-rigged ship	Westervelt & MacKay	New York City	United States	For Robert Kermit.
Date Unknown	Wyandank	Paddle steamer		New York City	United States	For private owner.
Unknown date	Zmeia	Zmeia-class schooner	Arsenal de Caracca	Cádiz	Spain	For Imperial Russian Navy.
