= List of ship launches in 1846 =

The list of ship launches in 1846 includes a chronological list of some ships launched in 1846.

Date	Ship	Class	Builder	Location	Country	Notes
1 January	Mary Woods	Steamship	Thomas Royden	Liverpool	United Kingdom	For John & Richard Bartlett.
14 January	Amphion	Frigate		Woolwich Dockyard	United Kingdom	For Royal Navy.
14 January	Henry Winch	Full-rigged ship	William Jones	Pwllheli	United Kingdom	For Peek Brothers & Winch.
15 January	Emerald	Steamship	Messrs. P. Cato & Co.	Liverpool	United Kingdom	For City of Dublin Steam Packet Company.
15 January	Wizard	Schooner	Messrs. A. Hall & Sons	Aberdeen	United Kingdom	For private owner.
26 January	Pharos	Steam yacht	Messrs. Fairbairn & Sons	Millwall	United Kingdom	For Commissioners of Northern Lights.
28 January	Ajax	Paddle steamer	Messrs. Thomas Vernon & Co.	Liverpool	United Kingdom	For City of Cork Steam Packet Company.
28 January	Panama	Full-rigged ship	Messrs. A. McMillan & Co.	Dumbarton	United Kingdom	For private owner.
28 January	Windsor	Paddle steamer	Messrs. Thomas Vernon & Co.	Liverpool	United Kingdom	For City of Dublin Steam Packet Company.
29 January	Emulation	Schooner	Westacott	Barnstaple	United Kingdom	For private owner.
30 January	Moozaffar	Steamship	Messrs Fletcher & Fuaznall	Limehouse	United Kingdom	For British East India Company.
10 February	Acadia	Full-rigged ship	Thomas Gales	Hylton	United Kingdom	For C. Walton.
17 February	Sphynx	Paddle steamer		Woolwich Dockyard	United Kingdom	For Royal Navy.
24 February	Sir William Wallace	Schooner	Messrs. Alex Hall & Sons	Aberdeen	United Kingdom	For Mr. Smith.
25 February	Grappler	Jackal-class gunvessel		Poplar	United Kingdom	For Royal Navy.
26 February	Garland	Paddle steamer		Woolwich Dockyard	United Kingdom	For Royal Navy, or Post Office Packet Service.
27 February	Copenhagen	Steamship	Robert Napier and Sons	Govan	United Kingdom	For private owner.
27 February	Esther	Schooner	Henry Jones	Port Madoc	United Kingdom	For private owner.
27 February	Prince of Wales	Steamship	Messrs. Tod & McGregor	Broomielaw	United Kingdom	For City of Dublin Steam Packet Company.
28 February	Ariel	Steamship	Ditchburn & Mare	Blackwall	United Kingdom	For P&O.
28 February	Sunda	Barque	Messrs. A. McMillan & Son	Dumbarton	United Kingdom	For private owner.
14 March	Lochlomond	Full-rigged ship	Messrs. Denny & Rankin	Dumbarton	United Kingdom	For private owner.
26 March	Admiral	Brig	Messrs. Walter Hood & Co.	Aberdeen	United Kingdom	For private owner.
26 March	Passe-Partout	Royal yacht		Indret	France	For Prince of Joinville.
28 March	Alceste	Frigate		Cherbourg	France	For French Navy.
28 March	Anne Henderson	Merchantman	Messrs. Steel and Son	Liverpool	United Kingdom	For Messrs. Steel and Son.
28 March	Antelope	Steamship	Messrs. James Hodgson & Co	Liverpool	United Kingdom	For Messrs. McTear and Hadfield.
28 March	Black Diamond	Steamship	Messrs. P. Cato and Company	Liverpool	United Kingdom	For City of Dublin Steam Packet Company.
28 March	Indian Chief	Barque	J. Crown	Sunderland	United Kingdom	For Mr. Wemyss.
28 March	Sir Henry Pottinger	Paddle steamer	Messrs. Fairbairn & Sons	Millwall	United Kingdom	For P&O.
30 March	Fanny Barnes	Schooner	Keetley	Hull	United Kingdom	For private owner.
March	Daring	Merchantman	W. Chambers	Sunderland	United Kingdom	For Burdess & Co.
March	Fethi Bukbar	Brig		Constantinople	Ottoman Empire	For Ottoman Navy.
March	Nejati Fer	Corvette		Constantinople	Ottoman Empire	For Ottoman Navy.
March	Peiki-Tidjaret	Steamship		Constantinople	Ottoman Empire	For Ottoman Navy.
March	Sourah Bahri	Brig		Constantinople	Ottoman Empire	For Ottoman Navy.
1 April	Cambria	Full-rigged ship	Messrs. John Scott & Sons	Greenock	United Kingdom	For private owner.
2 April	Pandore	Frigate		Brest	France	For French Navy.
3 April	Monarch	Steamship	Messrs. Barr & McNab	Renfrew	United Kingdom	For private owner.
8 April	Margaret Evans	Merchantman			United Kingdom	For Mr. Tinker.
10 April	Fanny	Steamship	Messrs. Barr & McNab	Renfrew	United Kingdom	For private owner.
11 April	Contest	Brig	Joseph White	East Cowes	United Kingdom	For Royal Navy.
13 April	Dolymelynllyn	Schooner	Messrs. Roberts Jones and Robert Roberts	Dolgelley	United Kingdom	For Robert Roberts.
13 April	Enterprise	Schooner	Messrs. Tayleur, Sanderson & Co.	Warrington	United Kingdom	For private owner.
13 April	Neptune	Schooner	Messrs. Tayleur, Sanderson & Co.	Warrington	United Kingdom	For private owner.
14 April	Victory	Full-rigged ship	Messrs. W. H. Rowan & Co.	Kelvinhaugh	United Kingdom	For private owner.
27 April	Corsair	Cutter yacht	Hansen	Cowes	United Kingdom	For John Congreve.
27 April	Unnamed	Brig	H. Barrick	Whitby	United Kingdom	For private owner.
28 April	Hebe	Brig	H. Barrick	Whitby	United Kingdom	For Mr. Arthur.
28 April	Sultana	Cutter yacht	Michael Ratsey	Cowes	United Kingdom	For R. C. Naylor.
28 April	Tynwald	Paddle steamer	Robert Napier and Sons	Govan	United Kingdom	For Isle of Man Steam Packet Company.
29 April	Lord of the Isles	Paddle steamer	R. Ashburner	Newby Bridge	United Kingdom	For Windermere Steam Yacht Co. Ltd.
30 April	Hammonia	Steamship		South Shields	United Kingdom	For private owner.
April	Colonna	Barque	L. T. Wang	Sunderland	United Kingdom	For Mr. Henderson.
April	Columbia	Packet ship		New York City	United States	For Old Black Ball Line.
April	Cygnet	Yacht		Poole	United Kingdom	For private owner.
April	Rajah	Merchantman	Oliver Chapman	Chepstow	United Kingdom	For private owner.
April	Vision	Yacht		Poole	United Kingdom	For T. Birchall.
12 May	Constance	Constance-class frigate		Pembroke Dockyard	United Kingdom	For Royal Navy.
12 May	Tamar	Barque	Messrs. Young and Cook	Newport	United Kingdom	For private owner.
12 May	The Matchless	Schooner	Messrs. Hall & Sons	Aberdeen	United Kingdom	For Lerwick and Leith New Shipping Co.
13 May	Arthur	Merchantman	Messrs. Grainger & Co.	Neath	United Kingdom	For Messrs. Ham & C0.
18 May	Gondola	Cutter yacht	Michael Ratsey	Cowes	United Kingdom	For W. H. Woodhouse.
23 May	Hound	Alert-class brig-sloop		Deptford Dockyard	United Kingdom	For Royal Navy.
25 May	Reefer	Pilot schooner	Brown & Bell	New York	United States	For United States Navy.
26 May	Gipsy Queen	Schooner	Messrs. W. H. Rowan & Co.	Glasgow	United Kingdom	For private owner.
26 May	Sidon	Frigate	Charles Napier	Deptford Dockyard	United Kingdom	For Royal Navy.
30 May	Devonian	Merchantman	W. Chambers	Southwick	United Kingdom	For Caleb Wilson and Bros.
30 May	Wards	Merchantman	Austin & Mills	Sunderland	United Kingdom	For Gilbert & Benjamin Ward.
May	Emily	Snow	L. T. Wang	Sunderland	United Kingdom	For H. Tanner.
May	Imperial	Merchantman	W. & J. Robinson	Sunderland	United Kingdom	For Edwards & Co.
May	Lord Hardinge	Full-rigged ship	L. Kennedy & Co.	Whitehaven	United Kingdom	For private owner.
May	Shamrock	Barque		Sunderland	United Kingdom	For private owner.
1 June	Duchess	Yacht	Payne	Ryde	United Kingdom	For Thomas Willis Fleming.
2 June	Enchantress	Schooner	Joseph White	Cowes	United Kingdom	For Earl of Cardigan.
8 June	Mary	Schooner	Robert Innes	Leith	United Kingdom	For Messrs. Milne and Lawson.
10 June	Erin-go-Bragh	Paddle steamer	Ditchburn & Mare	Leamouth	United Kingdom	For P&O.
10 June	Recruit	Brig	Ditchburn & Mare	Leamouth	United Kingdom	For Royal Navy.
11 June	Liver	Tug	Steam Tug Company	Wallasey	United Kingdom	For Steam Tug Company.
11 June	Marlborough	Full-rigged ship	Messrs. Smith	Newcastle upon Tyne	United Kingdom	For private owner.
11 June	Mary Gibson	Merchantman	W. Gibson	Hull	United Kingdom	For private owner.
11 June	Matilda	Barque	Connell	Belfast	United Kingdom	For Robert McDowell.
11 June	Ocean Queen	Barque	Messrs. Duthie	Aberdeen	United Kingdom	For private owner.
11 June	Pomona	Barque	John Westacott	Barnstaple	United Kingdom	For J. Richardson.
11 June	Queen Victoria	Yacht	Joseph White	East Cowes	United Kingdom	For Grand Duke Konstantin Nikolayevich of Russia.
23 June	Fenela	Paddle Steamer	Messrs. Thomas Vernon & Son.	Liverpool	United Kingdom	For private owner.
24 June	Cricket	Paddle steamer			United Kingdom	For private owner.
25 June	Teazer	Teazer-class gunvessel		Chatham Dockyard	United Kingdom	For Royal Navy.
27 June	Albany	Sloop-of-war		New York Navy Yard	United States	For United States Navy.
27 June	Ripon	Paddle steamer	Money Wigram and Sons	Blackwall Yard	United Kingdom	For P&O.
June	Daisy	Merchantman	H. & W. Carr	Sunderland	United Kingdom	For T. Elliott.
June	Jessie McClelland	Merchantman	Douglas	Sheuchan Mill	United Kingdom	For private owner.
June	Jewess	Schooner		Saint John	(United Kingdom of Great Britain and Ireland) Colony of New Brunswick	For private owner.
June	Maid of Auckland	Barque	L. T. Wang	Sunderland	United Kingdom	For Mr. Anderson.
June	Naomi	Brigantine	E. Brown	Sunderland	United Kingdom	For S. Evans.
June	Providence	Schooner	J. Henderson	Sunderland	United Kingdom	For W. Spencer.
June	Robert & Mary	Snow	W. & J. Robinson, or J. & J. Robinson	Sunderland	United Kingdom	For R. Surteer.
25 July	Antelope	Antelope-class sloop	Ditchburn & Mare	Blackwall	United Kingdom	For Royal Navy.
25 July	Princess Clementine	Steamship			United Kingdom	For South Eastern and Continental Steam Packet Company.
25 July	Sharpshooter	Sharpshooter-class gunvessel	Ditchburn & Mare	Blakwall	United Kingdom	For Royal Navy.
26 July	Odin	Paddle frigate	William Fairbairn	Deptford Dockyard	United Kingdom	For Royal Navy.
July	Æolus	Full-rigged ship		Saint John	(United Kingdom of Great Britain and Ireland) Colony of New Brunswick	For private owner.
July	Mary Ann Stewart	Barque		Pictou	(United Kingdom of Great Britain and Ireland) Colony of Nova Scotia	For private owner.
July	Messenger	Merchantman	W. Carr	Sunderland	United Kingdom	For T. Coxon.
July	Rienzi	Merchantman	J. Candlish	Sunderland	United Kingdom	For J. Denniston.
5 August	Conflict	Conflict-class sloop		Pembroke Dockyard	United Kingdom	For Royal Navy.
8 August	Haddington	Steamship	Messrs. Thomas Vernon & Son	Liverpool	United Kingdom	For private owner.
8 August	Tiber	Steamship	Messrs. Caird & Company	Greenock	United Kingdom	For P&O.
10 August	Rifleman	Rifleman-class gunvessel		Portsmouth Dockyard	United Kingdom	For Royal Navy.
11 August	Albert Edward, Prince of Wales	Pilot boat	Thomas Royden	location	United Kingdom	For private owner.
11 August	James Atherton	Ferry	Messrs. Thomas Pearson & Co.	Liverpool	United Kingdom	For private owner.
11 August	Sarah Sands	Steamship	Messrs. James Hodgson & Co.	Liverpool	United Kingdom	For Messrs. Thomas and Joseph Sands & Co.
14 August	Nile	Barque	Messrs. W. H.Rowan & Co.	Glasgow	United Kingdom	For private owner.
21 August	Thetis	Frigate	Messrs. Chatfied, Read & Creuze	Devonport Dockyard	United Kingdom	For Royal Navy.
22 August	Germantown	Sloop-of-war		Philadelphia Navy Yard	United States	For United States Navy.
August	Elizabeth	Schooner		Saint John	(United Kingdom of Great Britain and Ireland) Colony of New Brunswick	For private owner.
August	Surat	Barque	William Wilkinson	Sunderland	United Kingdom	For Woods & Co.
August	Teazer	Pilot cutter	Read	Liverpool	United Kingdom	For private owner.
5 September	Encounter	Encounter-class sloop		Pembroke Dockyard	United Kingdom	For Royal Navy.
5 September	Gitana	Schooner	Messrs. Hall & Sons	Aberdeen	United Kingdom	For Messrs. Blaikie Brothers.
5 September	Minx	Minx-class gunvessel	Messrs. Miller & Ravenhill	Blackwall	United Kingdom	For Royal Navy.
7 September	Luna	Barque	John Taylor	Peterhead	United Kingdom	For private owner.
7 September	The Loodianah	East Indiaman	Messrs. W. B. Jones & Co.	Liverpool	United Kingdom	For Messrs. Henry Moore & Co.
8 September	Sultan	Steamship	Messrs. Tod & McGregor	Glasgow	United Kingdom	For P&O.
10 September	Haidee	Full-rigged ship	Alex Stevenson Jr.	Peterhead	United Kingdom	For Messrs. Scott & Grieves.
12 September	Ferozapore	Barque	Joseph Cunard	Chatham	(United Kingdom of Great Britain and Ireland) Province of Canada	For Michael Samuel.
22 September	Town of Preston	Merchantman	Messrs. Nicholson & Simpson	Glasson Dock	United Kingdom	For Preston Foreign Shipping Company.
23 September	John Wesley	Brig	Messrs. White	Cowes	United Kingdom	For Wesleyan Methodists Missions.
24 September	Surat	Steamship	Messrs. Thomas Vernon & Co.	Liverpool	United Kingdom	For Bombay Steam Navigation Company.
26 September	Juverna	Steamship	Messrs. George Lunnell & Co.	Bristol	United Kingdom	For Bristol General Steam Navigation Company.
26 September	Matilda McColl	Smack	Messrs. William H. Rowan & Co.	Kelvinhaugh	United Kingdom	For John McColl.
27 September	Amelia	Brig		Piraeus	Greece	For private owner.
September	Isabella	Schooner	A. Black	Rothesay	United Kingdom	For private owner.
September	John Mackenzie	Full-rigged ship		Pictou	(United Kingdom of Great Britain and Ireland) Colony of Nova Scotia	For private owner.
6 October	Lion	Paddle steamer	Messrs. Brownlow, Pearson & Co.	Hull	United Kingdom	For Hull Steam Packet Co.
8 October	Heiram	Sloop	S. Gutteridge	selby	United Kingdom	For Samuel Foster.
10 October	Mariner	Acorn-class brig-sloop		Pembroke Dockyard	United Kingdom	For Royal Navy.
10 October	Minerva	Steamship	Messrs. Vernon & Co.	Liverpool	United Kingdom	For Cork and Glasgow Steam Packet Company.
22 October	Osmanli	Full-rigged ship	William Denny and Brothers	Dumbarton	United Kingdom	For Levant Company.
24 October	Humber	Brigantine		Tatmagouche	(United Kingdom of Great Britain and Ireland) Colony of Nova Scotia	For private owner.
3 November	Anne Cropper	Full-rigged ship	John M. Gales	Sunderland	United Kingdom	For Clint, Treyaningand & Co.
3 November	Dee	Schooner	Messrs. William Simpson & Co.	Aberdeen	United Kingdom	For Aberdeen, Leith and Clyde Shipping Co.
6 November	Duke of Sutherland	Paddle steamer	Robert Napier and Sons	Govan	United Kingdom	For Aberdeen Steam Navigation Co.
18 November	Niger	Niger-class sloop		Woolwich Dockyard	United Kingdom	For Royal Navy.
19 November	Arani	Full-rigged ship	William Denny and Brothers	Dumbarton	United Kingdom	For Levant Company.
21 November	Princess Helena	Steamsbip	J. Laird	Birkenhead	United Kingdom	For private owner.
22 November	Sir Robert Peel	Ocean liner	William H. Webb	New York City	United States	For private owner.
28 November	Sir Robert Peel	Packet ship		New York	United States	For private owner.
November	Hindoo	Barque	J. Candlish	Sunderland	United Kingdom	For J. Hay.
November	Watchman	Brigantine		Bay of Fundy	(United Kingdom of Great Britain and Ireland) Unknown	For private owner.
3 December	Iron Gem	Barque	Coutts	Walker	United Kingdom	For private owner.
8 December	Sea Witch	Clipper ship	Smith & Dimon	Manhattan, New York	United States	For Howland & Aspinwall.
19 December	Orion	Steamship	Messrs. Caird & Company	Greenock	United Kingdom	For private owner.
20 December	Comte d'Eu	Aviso		Havre de Grâce	France	For French Navy.
Spring	David Hay	Full-rigged ship		Quebec	(United Kingdom of Great Britain and Ireland) Province of Canada	For private owner.
Summer	Anglo-Saxon	Merchantman			United States	For private owner.
Unknown date	Abet	Schooner	W. & J. Pile	Sunderland	United Kingdom	For J. Mussen.
Unknown date	Achsah	Snow	R. Greenwell	Sunderland	United Kingdom	For J. Clay.
Unknown date	Activity	Snow	John Barkes	Sunderland	United Kingdom	For Mr. Surtees.
Unknown date	Agnes King	Barque	W. Byers	Sunderland	United Kingdom	For T. King.
Unknown date	Allison	Barque		Sunderland	United Kingdom	For Robson & Co.
Unknown date	Alvin Clark	Schooner	Bates and Davis Shipyard	Trenton, Michigan	United States	For John Clark.
Unknown date	Amaranth	Barque		Monkwearmouth	United Kingdom	For Thomas B. Walker Sr.
Unknown date	Ambon	Full-rigged ship		Rotterdam	Netherlands	For Royal Netherlands Navy.
Unknown date	Amigos	Barque		Sunderland	United Kingdom	For Barrick & Co.
Unknown date	Amy Robsart	Barque	Todd & Brown	Sunderland	United Kingdom	For Errington Bell.
Unknown date	Anna	Merchantman	Austin & Mills	Sunderland	United Kingdom	For Thomas Wood.
Unknown date	Anne	Schooner	R. Lister	Sunderland	United Kingdom	For Mr. Eltringham.
Unknown date	Ariel	Brigantine		Pictou	(United Kingdom of Great Britain and Ireland) Colony of Nova Scotia	For private owner.
Unknown date	Aspasia	Barque	R. & W. Hutchinson	Sunderland	United Kingdom	For private owner.
Unknown date	Atlantic	Steamboat		New York	United States	For private owner.
Unknown date	Banda	Full-rigged ship		Dunkerque	France	For Royal Netherlands Navy.
Unknown date	Bellona	Merchantman	W. Chambers	Sunderland	United Kingdom	For Mr. Nicholson.
Unknown date	Blue Bell	Merchantman	James Laing	Sunderland	United Kingdom	For Duncan Dunbar.
Unknown date	Blyth	Snow	Bowman and Drummond	Blyth	United Kingdom	For Mr. Bowman.
Unknown date	Bonito	Full-rigged ship			United States	For United States Navy.
Unknown date	British Queen	Snow	Benjamin Hodgson	Sunderland	United Kingdom	For Mr. Kelso.
Unknown date	Bubona	Merchantman	William Petrie	Sunderland	United Kingdom	For Wallace & Co.
Unknown date	Cactus	Snow	J. T. Allcock	Sunderland	United Kingdom	For J. Allcock.
Unknown date	Caspar	Barque	J. Crown	Sunderland	United Kingdom	For W. Eldred.
Unknown date	Cassibelaunus	Barque	Peter Austin	Sunderland	United Kingdom	For Pow & Co.
Unknown date	Challenger	Snow	Hylton Carr	Hylton	United Kingdom	For J. Rodham.
Unknown date	Christian Charlotte	Snow	Hylton Carr	Hylton	United Kingdom	For Mr. Smith.
Unknown date	Cleaver	Merchantman	Ralph Hutchinson	Sunderland	United Kingdom	For Mr. Walker.
Unknown date	Clymene	Barque	R. Hutchinson	Sunderland	United Kingdom	For private owner.
Unknown date	Confidence	Snow	G. W. & W. J. Hall	Sunderland	United Kingdom	For F. Pank & W. Burton.
Unknown date	Conquering Hero	Snow	W. Naizby	Sunderland	United Kingdom	For T. Barnes.
Unknown date	Coquette	Pilot boat	Louis Winde	Chelsea, Massachusetts	United States	For James A. Perkins.
Unknown date	Danube	Snow	W. & J. Robinson	Sunderland	United Kingdom	For J. Hay.
Unknown date	Demerara	Merchantman	Wilson Chilton	Sunderland	United Kingdom	For J. Panton.
Unknown date	Earl of Ripon	Snow	Peter Austin	Sunderland	United Kingdom	For Mr. Mitcheson.
Unknown date	Enterprise	Sloop	Bank Quay Foundry Co.	Warrington	United Kingdom	For private owner.
Unknown date	Esther Ann	Barque		Sunderland	United Kingdom	For Crabtree & Co.
Unknown date	Fancy	Snow	Ralph Hutchinson	Sunderland	United Kingdom	For C. Allcock.
Unknown date	Florinda	Barque	W. Spowers & Co	Sunderland	United Kingdom	For T. Barnes.
Unknown date	Fuchia or Fuschia	Merchantman	J. T. Alcock	Sunderland	United Kingdom	For J. T. Alcock.
Unknown date	General McLeod	Steamship		Calcutta	India	For India General Steam Company.
Unknown date	Glide	Merchantman	William Doxford & W. Crown	Sunderland	United Kingdom	For private owner.
Unknown date	Halifax	Barque		Sunderland	United Kingdom	For Bell & Co.
Unknown date	Henry's	Merchantman	William Doxford & W. Crown	Sunderland	United Kingdom	For private owner.
Unknown date	Holland	Fourth rate		Dunkerque	France	For Royal Netherlands Navy.
Unknown date	Isabella & Jane	Schooner	J. Barkes	Sunderland	United Kingdom	For Mr. Robinson.
Unknown date	Jemima	Snow	R. H. Potts & Bros.	Sunderland	United Kingdom	For W. Potts.
Unknown date	John Bull	Barque	G. W. & W. J. Hall	Sunderland	United Kingdom	For Temperley & Co.
Unknown date	John French	Merchantman	Bartram & Lister	Sunderland	United Kingdom	For French & Co.
Unknown date	John Hunter	Merchantman	Bartram & Lister	Sunderland	United Kingdom	For Denton & Co.
Unknown date	Joseph E. Coffee	Paddle steamer	B. C. Terry	New York	United Kingdom	For private owner.
Unknown date	Kate	Barque		Sunderland	United Kingdom	For H. Metcalf.
Unknown date	Keepsake	Snow	J. Henderson	Sunderland	United Kingdom	For Mr. Hutchinson.
Unknown date	Kezia Page	Schooner	J. Hardie & M. Clark	Sunderland	United Kingdom	For Richard Page.
Unknown date	Leo	Snow	Brown	Sunderland	United Kingdom	For W. & J. Hay.
Unknown date	Lima	Merchantman		Peterhead	United Kingdom	For private owner.
Unknown date	Lord Montgomerie	Brig		River Clyde	United Kingdom	For private owner.
Unknown date	Mary Ann	Snow	Todd & Brown	Hylton	United Kingdom	For A. Ray.
Unknown date	Mary Graham	Barque	William Doxford & W. Crown	Sunderland	United Kingdom	For E. Graham.
Unknown date	Mecidiye	Mecidiye-class paddle frigate	Tersâne-i Âmire	Constantinople	Ottoman Empire	For Ottoman Navy.
Unknown date	Minna	Barque	Ralph Hutchinson	Sunderland	United Kingdom	For Mr. Thompson.
Unknown date	Mona	Yacht		Poole	United Kingdom	For private owner.
Unknown date	Mount Vernon	Steamship		Philadelphia, Pennsylvania	United States	For private owner.
Unknown date	Neptune	Schooner	Bank Quay Foundry Co.	Warrington	United Kingdom	For private owner.
Unknown date	Oregon	Paddle steamer		New York	United States	For Mobile Mail Line
Unknown date	Pacific	Merchantman	Todd & Brown	Sunderland	United Kingdom	For H. White.
Unknown date	Parthian	Merchantman		Sunderland	United Kingdom	For C. Allcock.
Unknown date	Pasha	Barque	Sykes & Co	Sunderland	United Kingdom	For Allen & Co.
Unknown date	Pearl	Snow	Robert Thompson & Sons	Sunderland	United Kingdom	For private owner.
Unknown date	Philip Laing	Barque	Laing & Co.	Sunderland	United Kingdom	For Laing & Ridley.
Unknown date	Plover	Snow	R. H. Potts & Bros.	Sunderland	United Kingdom	For Potts Bros.
Unknown date	Premier	Paddle steamer	William Denny and Brothers	Dumbarton	United Kingdom	For Dumbarton Steamboat Co.
Unknown date	United Kingdom	Ditchburn & Mare	Leamouth	Preussischer Adler	Aviso	For Prussian Navy.
Unknown date	Prospect	Schooner	H. Dobbinson	Sunderland	United Kingdom	For Burton & Co.
Unknown date	Pylades	Full-rigged ship			Netherlands	For Royal Netherlands Navy.
Unknown date	Pym	Schooner	William R. Abbay	Sunderland	United Kingdom	For W. Abbay.
Unknown date	Raleigh	Barque	James Laing	Sunderland	United Kingdom	For J. Laing.
Unknown date	Rebecca	Merchantman	John M. Gales	Sunderland	United Kingdom	For John M. Gales.
Unknown date	Regina	Snow	Austin & Mills	Sunderland	United Kingdom	For Austin & Co.
Unknown date	Reward	Merchantman	W. H. Pearson	Sunderland	United Kingdom	For private owner.
Unknown date	Royal Consort	Merchantman	Hall	Monkwearmouth	United Kingdom	For Banff & London Shipping Co.
Unknown date	Sailor	Merchantman	Austin & Mills	Sunderland	United Kingdom	For G. Hudson.
Unknown date	Samuel	Merchantman	W. Carr	Sunderland	United Kingdom	For J. Pegg.
Unknown date	Saparoea	Full-rigged ship		Vlissingen	Netherlands	For Royal Netherlands Navy.
Unknown date	Sarah	Snow	John & J. P. Murray	Sunderland	United Kingdom	For Ray & Co.
Unknown date	Sarah	Schooner	Brundrit & Whiteway	Runcorn	United Kingdom	For Brundrit & Whiteway.
Unknown date	Scottish Maid	Schooner	William Wilkinson	Sunderland	United Kingdom	For Rose & Co.
Unknown date	Sea	Merchantman	Peter Austin	Sunderland	United Kingdom	For John Barry.
Unknown date	Sea Witch	Clipper		New York	United States	For Howland & Aspinwall.
Unknown date	Sela	Merchantman	Stobart & Soppit	Sunderland	United Kingdom	For John Stobart.
Unknown date	Subraon	Barque	J. Crown	Sunderland	United Kingdom	For Arthur & Co.
Unknown date	Taif	Mecidiye-class paddle frigate	Tersâne-i Âmire	Constantinople	Ottoman Empire	For Ottoman Navy.
Unknown date	Themis	Snow	Richard Wilkinson	Sunderland	United Kingdom	For T, & G. Reed.
Unknown date	Thomas & Elizabeth	Snow	Bowman and Drummond	Blyth	United Kingdom	For Dryden & Co.
Unknown date	Thomas Powell	Sidewheel steamboat	Lawrence & Sneden	Manhattan, New York	United States	For Thomas Powell et al.
Unknown date	Traveller	Snow	William Doxfore & W. Crown	Sunderland	United Kingdom	For P. Dale.
Unknown date	Vedra	Snow	Robert Thompson & Sons	Sunderland	United Kingdom	For Grayden & Co.
Unknown date	Vesper	Merchantman	W. Carr	Sunderland	United Kingdom	For Moore & Co.
Unknown date	Vibilia	Snow	J. Hardie & M. Clark	Sunderland	United Kingdom	For M. Robinson.
Unknown date	Vivid	Merchantman	J. Rogerson	Sunderland	United Kingdom	For Hopper & Co.
Unknown date	Volga	steamboat	Rontgen	Rybinsk	Russia	For private owner.
Unknown date	William & Jane	Snow	H. Carr	Sunderland	United Kingdom	For Mr. Teignmouth.
Unknown date	Woodman	Merchantman	Bartram & Lister	Sunderland	United Kingdom	For William Doxford.
Unknown date	Zarah	Barque		Sunderland	United Kingdom	For Mr. Burrell.
Unknown date	Zarah	Barque		Sunderland	United Kingdom	For Ramsey & Co.
