= List of non-combat vessels of the Ottoman steam navy =

This is a list of miscellaneous ships of the Ottoman Navy:

== Steamer (Vapur) ==
Name	Builder Dimensions Displacement, Hull Speed Complement	Machinery Boiler, Bunkers Engines Armament	Ordered Laid down Launched Trials	Commissioned Decommissioned Afterward
Sürtat	Nicolls Booles & William Good, Bridport			
Sagir	Scott, Greenock			
Peyk-i Şevket	SA Chantiers Benet, La Ciotat			
Eser-i Hayır	Tersâne-i Âmire, Istanbul, Constantinople			
Ereğli	-, Greenock			
Pesendire	Tersâne-i Âmire, Constantinople			
Pursut	-, -			
Gemlik	-, -			
Peyk-i Şevket	Tersâne-i Âmire, Constantinople			
Medar-i Ticaret	Money Wigram, Blackwall, London			
Tair-i Bahri	Tersâne-i Âmire, Constantinople			
Mesir-i Bahri	Tersâne-i Âmire, Istanbul, Constantinople			
Necm-i Şeref	-, -			
Girit	-, -			
Vasıta-i Ticaret	D. White, Cowes, Isle of Wight			
Hüma-i Tevfik	W. Denny, Dumbarton			
Hümayış	-, Glasgow			
Eser-i Nuzhet	Tersâne-i Âmire, Constantinople			
Mûsul	-, -			
Eser-i Ticaret	B. Wallis & Co., London			
Vesile-i Ticaret	Tersâne-i Âmire, Constantinople			
Tuna	Alexander Denny, Dumbarton			
Silistre	Alexander Denny, Dumbarton			
Sehber	J. White, Cowes, Isle of Wight			
Ereğli	-, -			
Sudaver	Brown and Bell, New York City			
Peyk-i Ticaret	Tersâne-i Âmire, Constantinople			
Sulhiye	-, -			
Hüma-i Pervaz	-, Glasgow			
Trablusgarb	-, -			
Pir-i Levend	-, -			
Ömer Paşa	-, -			
Gürsur	-, -			
Yıldız	-, -			
Müverrid-i Nusret	M. Samuelson & Co., Hull			
Şiar-i Nusret	M. Samuelson & Co., Hull			
Sulhiye	-, -			
Safiye	-, -			
Nedim	-, -			
Bozcaada	-, -			
Bar	J. White, Cowes, Isle of Wight			
Gör	T. White, Cowes, Isle of Wight			
Trabzon	-, -			
Haliç	-, -			
Kiyoçya	-, -			

== Transporter / Depot ship ==
Name	Builder Dimensions Displacement, Hull Speed Complement	Machinery Boiler, Bunkers Engines Armament	Ordered Laid down Launched Trials	Commissioned Decommissioned Afterward
Babıl	Millwall Shipbuilding & Engineering Company, London			
Hayreddin	J & R White, Cowes, Isle of Wight			
Kılıç Ali	J & R White, Cowes, Isle of Wight			
Malakof	Denny & Renkie, Glasgow			
Kars	Denny & Renkie, Glasgow			
Cidde	SA Cockerill, Antwerp			
Hüdeyde	C. Mitchell & Co., Glasgow			
Marmara	London & Glasgow Co., Glasgow			
Mekke	London & Glasgow Co., Glasgow			
Dolmabahçe	-, Glasgow			
Bezm-i Âlem	Fairfield Shipbuilding, Glasgow			
Tîr-i Müjgân	Barrow Shipbuilding, Barrow-in-Furness			
Eser-i Cedîd	T. Royden & Son., Sunderland			
Kosova	P. Odero, Sestri Ponente			
Mithat Paşa	Sir Raylton Dixon & Co., Newcastle upon Tyne			
Reşit Paşa	Sir Raylton Dixon & Co., Newcastle upon Tyne			
Plevne	Thompson & Co., Dundee			
Urla	Denny Bros., Dumbarton			
Nara	-, -			
Mahmut Şevket Paşa	J. L. Thompson & Son., Sunderland			
Trabzon	Kockums MV, Malmö			
Samsun	C. S. Swan Hunter, Newcastle upon Tyne			

== Tugboat (Römorkör) ==
Name	Builder Dimensions Displacement, Hull Speed Complement	Machinery Boiler, Bunkers Engines Armament	Ordered Laid down Launched Trials	Commissioned Decommissioned Afterward
Yenikapı	SA Stabilimento Tecnico Triestino, Trieste			
Mesut	-, -			
Samsun	Scott & Sons, Bowling			
Menderes	Scott & Sons, Bowling			
Sürat	-, -			
Katerin	-, -			
Teshıla	-, -			
Muha	-, -			
Kurt	-, -			
İğtinam	-, -			
Gazal	H. Vujik & Zonen, Capelle aan den IJssel			
Memo	-, -			
Express	-, -			
Fatihiye	Scott & Sons, Bowling			
Istanbul	F. Barachini, Sestri Ponente			
France	Cox & Co., Falmouth			
Bordeaux	S. MacKnight & Co., Ayr			
Maggie Grech	Admiralty Dockyard, Sheerness			
Bospordok	-, -			
Mary Louise	J. P. Rennoldson, South Shields			
Lutèce	S. MacKnight & Co., Ayr			
Eole	F. Barachini, Sestri Ponente			
Paris	D. J. Dunlop & Co., Port Glasgow			
Livaerpool	D. J. Dunlop & Co., Port Glasgow			
İstinye	-, -			
Foça	-, Piraeus			
Elena	Guiffray Tersâne, Smyrna			
Cemil	-, -			
Gürçıstan	-, -			
Bayraklı	-, -			
Şevkiyat	-, -			
Bornova	-, -			
Dofen	F. Barachini, Sestri Ponente			
Maltepe	-, -			
Sa'na	-, -			
Alemdar	Helsingør Jernsk & Mark., Helsingør			
Abdül Kadir	-, -			
Arslan	-, -			
Süleymaniye	-, -			
Leonida	J. Readhead & Co., South Shields			
Menfaat	-, -			

== Tugboat used as water depot or water tanker ship ==
Name	Builder Dimensions Displacement, Hull Speed Complement	Machinery Boiler, Bunkers Engines Armament	Ordered Laid down Launched Trials	Commissioned Decommissioned Afterward
Boyana	John Thompson, Rotherhithe, London			
Çatalca	J & R White, Cowes, Isle of Wight			
Oltanıca	J & R White, Cowes, Isle of Wight			
Suda	Tersâne-i Âmire, Istanbul, Constantinople			
Şeref Nümâ	-, -			
Ereğli	Tersâne-i Âmire, Constantinople			
Islahat	Tersâne-i Âmire, Constantinople			
Marmara	-, -			
Hüzhet	-, -			
Alos	-, -			
Fazullah	-, -			
Kasım Paşa	Tersâne-i Âmire, Constantinople			
Fındıklı	Tersâne-i Âmire, Constantinople			
Kabataş	Tersâne-i Âmire, Constantinople			
Medvet Resan	Tersâne-i Âmire, Constantinople			
Cibali	Tersâne-i Âmire, Constantinople			
Rusçuk	Tersâne-i Âmire, Constantinople			
Tophane	Tersâne-i Âmire, Constantinople			
