= Ottoman frigate Taif =

Steam frigate of the Ottoman Navy

- Woodcut of Taif's sister ship Feyzâ-i Bahrî visiting Southampton, United Kingdom.

History

Ottoman Empire
- Name: Taif
- Ordered: 1845
- Builder: Tersâne-i Âmire, Istanbul
- Laid down: 1845
- Launched: 1846
- Completed: 1847
- Out of service: 1867
- Fate: Scrapped, 1868

General characteristics (as built)
- Class & type: Mecidiye-class paddle frigate
- Tons burthen: 1,443 bm
- Length: 69.1 m (226 ft 8 in) (o/a)
- Beam: 11.7 m (38 ft 5 in)
- Draft: 5.1 m (16 ft 9 in)
- Installed power: 900 ihp (670 kW); 2 × boilers
- Propulsion: 1 × direct-acting steam engine; 2 × side paddlewheels
- Speed: 9 knots (17 km/h; 10 mph)
- Complement: 320
- Armament: 2 × 10 in (254 mm) Paixhans guns; 4 × 32-pdr guns; 24 × 32-pdr guns

Taif was one of four wooden-hulled Mecidiye-class paddle frigates built for the Ottoman Navy in the 1840s; they were the first Ottoman-built warships powered by steam. She served with the fleet until 1867, including during the Crimean War, where she saw a minor battle with a Russian frigate in the Black Sea. She was present at the Battle of Sinop, but her steam engine allowed her to escape before the Russian fleet destroyed the Ottoman squadron in the port. The ship remained in service until 1867, seeing little activity during this period, and was ultimately broken up in 1868.

== Design ==
Taif was a Mecidiye-class paddle frigate. She was 69.1 m (226 ft 8 in) long overall, with a beam of 11.7 m (38 ft 5 in) and a draft of 5.1 m (16 ft 9 in). Her tonnage was 1,443 tons burthen. She was propelled by a pair of paddlewheels that were driven by a direct-acting steam engine, with steam provided by two coal-fired boilers. Her propulsion system was rated at 900 indicated horsepower (670 kW) for a top speed of 9 knots (17 km/h; 10 mph). Her coal storage capacity amounted to 150 metric tons (150 long tons; 170 short tons). She had a crew of 320.

The ship was armed with a battery of two 10 in (254 mm) shell-firing Paixhans guns on the upper deck, four 32-pdr guns also on the upper deck, and twenty-four 32-pdr guns on the main deck. The guns were all of British manufacture, as Ottoman cannon foundries lacked the expertise necessary to manufacture modern shell-firing guns.

== Service history ==
Taif was ordered in 1845 as part of a modest naval expansion program aimed at building the first steam-powered ships of the Ottoman Navy. Several steam yachts had been built in the 1830s, but these were primarily used by government officials and were not proper warships. She was laid down in 1846 at the Imperial Arsenal in Constantinople, and was launched later that year. She was completed in 1847 and following sea trials, was commissioned into the fleet that year. Since steam engines were still a novelty in the Ottoman fleet, the crew had no experience operating the machinery and so four skilled engineers were contracted to train the crew. In 1848, Taif and her sister ship Mecidiye had to be pressed into service as merchant steamers carrying passengers to Samsun, as the Ottoman state-owned passenger service was not large enough to handle the volume of passengers.

=== Crimean War ===
Taif saw action during the Crimean War. In September 1853, the Ottoman fleet organized three squadrons in the Black Sea as tensions with Russia rose. Taif was assigned to a squadron consisting of her three sister ships, under the command of Mustafa Pasha, with Taif serving as his flagship. The squadron was tasked with patrolling the eastern Black Sea coast of the Ottoman Empire, including Circassia and Georgia. On 19 November, after the start of the war, Pasha took his squadron to Sinop to meet another squadron under Osman Pasha; while en route on 9 November, Taif and the other frigates encountered the Russian frigate Flora off Pitsunda but were unable to defeat her in a seven-hour battle. They scored only two hits on the Russian vessel, inflicting no damage, while the Ottoman frigates were hit several times, with Taif requiring to be taken under tow to Sinop.

After arriving in Sinop, Mustafa attempted to convince Osman to withdraw from the exposed position, but the latter refused so Mustafa sent three of his ships back to Constantinople, remaining behind aboard Taif. Osman's squadron was subsequently annihilated at the Battle of Sinop on 30 November, but Taif survived the battle to retreat to the capital. Mustafa had seen the Russian fleet approach and quickly got steam worked up in Taif's boilers, allowing her to leave the harbor before the attack began. She was the only Ottoman warship to escape the disaster; while she steamed to escape the Russian fleet, she was pursued by the Russian frigate Kulevchi. The two frigates exchanged a heavy fire, but Kulevchi was unable to slow Taif down and she was able to escape. After breaking free, Taif encountered Russian reinforcements commanded by Vladimir Kornilov, but the latter's ships were too slow to catch Taif. The destruction of the fleet at Sinop drastically reduced the ability of the Ottoman Navy to take an active role in the war, and thereafter the Anglo-French fleets led the effort against the Russian Black Sea Fleet.

=== Later career ===
In 1857, the ship returned to the Imperial Arsenal for a refit that included reducing her armament to a battery of twelve 32-pdr guns on the main deck. The ship remained in service for another ten years, during which time she escorted Albert Edward, Prince of Wales on a visit to Constantinople in May and June 1862. In October 1864, Taif was used to carry some 2,000 Circassian soldiers from Trabzon to Izmit. The ship was decommissioned in 1867 and broken up for the following year at the Imperial Arsenal.
