= Mecidiye-class frigate =

Ottoman paddle ships

- Woodcut of Feyzâ-i Bahrî visiting Southampton, United Kingdom

Class overview
- Operators: Ottoman Navy
- Preceded by: None
- Succeeded by: Mubir-i Sürur
- Built: 1846–1848
- Completed: 4
- Scrapped: 4

General characteristics (as built)
- Class & type: Paddle frigate
- Tons burthen: 1,448 bm
- Length: 69.1 m (226 ft 8 in) (o/a)
- Beam: 11.7 m (38 ft 5 in)
- Draft: 5.1 m (16 ft 9 in)
- Installed power: 900 ihp (670 kW); 2 × boilers
- Propulsion: 1 × direct-acting steam engine; 2 × side paddlewheels
- Speed: 9 knots (17 km/h; 10 mph)
- Complement: 320
- Armament: 2 × 10 in (254 mm) Paixhans guns; 4 × 32-pdr guns; 24 × 32-pdr guns

The Mecidiye class of paddle frigates consisted of four ships of the Ottoman Navy built in the 1840s. The class comprised Mecidiye, Taif, Saik-i Şadi, and Feyzâ-i Bahrî.

== Design ==
The ships of the Mecdiye class of paddle frigates were the first steam-powered warships to be built in the Ottoman Empire. The Ottoman government had previously ordered three small steam yachts for use by the sultan in the late 1830s.

The ships of the class were 69.1 m (226 ft 8 in) long overall, with a beam of 11.7 m (38 ft 5 in) and a draft of 5.1 m (16 ft 9 in). Mecidiye's tonnage was 1,448 tons burthen, while the other three members of the class were 1,443 tons burthen. Their hulls were constructed with wood. The ships had a crew of 320 officers and enlisted men.

They were propelled by a pair of paddlewheels that were driven by a 2-cylinder direct-acting steam engine that was manufactured by Maudslay, Sons and Field. Steam was provided by two coal-fired boilers that were vented through a single funnel. Their propulsion system was rated at 900 indicated horsepower (670 kW) for a top speed of 9 knots (17 km/h; 10 mph). Coal storage capacity amounted to 150 metric tons (150 long tons; 170 short tons).

The ships were armed with a battery of two 10 in (254 mm) shell-firing Paixhans guns on the upper deck, which were mounted on rotatable gun carriages. They also carried four 32-pdr guns also on the upper deck, and twenty-four 32-pdr guns on the main deck. The guns were all of British manufacture, as Ottoman cannon foundries lacked the expertise necessary to manufacture modern shell-firing guns.

In 1857, Mecidiye had her armament reduced to four of the 32-pounder guns on the main deck, while the other three retained twelve of their main deck 32-pounders. Feyzâ-i Bahrî was disarmed altogether in 1867.

== Ships ==
Ship	Builder	Laid down	Launched	Completed
Mecidiye	Imperial Arsenal	1846	1846	1847
Taif	Imperial Arsenal	1846	1846	1847
Saik-i Şadi	Imperial Arsenal	1846	1847	1847
Feyzâ-i Bahrî	Imperial Arsenal	1846	1847	1848

== Service history ==
In 1848, Mecidiye and Taif were used to ferry passengers to Samsun, as the Ottoman state-owned passenger service was not large enough to handle the volume of traffic. In May 1851, Feyzâ-i Bahrî visited the United Kingdom, the first time an Ottoman steam warship stopped in the country.

All four ships saw service during the Crimean War against the Russian Empire in 1853–1855; they operated together as a squadron commanded by Mustafa Pasha. They engaged the Russian frigate Flora in November 1853, but the action ended without a significant result. Later that month, Pasha took his squadron to Sinop, but he left shortly before the disastrous Battle of Sinop saw the annihilation of the Ottoman fleet at the hands of the Russian Black Sea Fleet.

After the war, Sultan Abdülaziz used Saik-i Şadi as a yacht, cruising aboard her frequently. In 1861, Taif was broken up for scrap. Feyzâ-i Bahrî served as a transport during Ottoman attempts to suppress the Cretan Revolt in 1866. Saik-i Şadi followed Taif to the breakers' yard in 1867. Feyzâ-i Bahrî was decommissioned in 1878 and sold for scrap two years later. Mecidiye was the last-surviving member of the class; in 1888, she was refitted in the Imperial Arsenal, and in 1890, she became a coal storage hulk. She was ultimately decommissioned in 1896 and later scrapped in 1903.
