= Ottoman frigate Mecidiye =

Steam frigate of the Ottoman Navy

- Woodcut of Mecidiye's sister ship Feyzâ-i Bahrî visiting Southampton, United Kingdom.

History

Ottoman Empire
- Name: Mecidiye
- Ordered: 1845
- Builder: Tersâne-i Âmire, Istanbul
- Laid down: 1845
- Launched: 1846
- Completed: 1847
- Out of service: 1896
- Fate: Scrapped, 1903

General characteristics (as built)
- Class & type: Mecidiye-class paddle frigate
- Tons burthen: 1,443 bm
- Length: 69.1 m (226 ft 8 in) (o/a)
- Beam: 11.7 m (38 ft 5 in)
- Draft: 5.1 m (16 ft 9 in)
- Installed power: 900 ihp (670 kW); 2 × boilers
- Propulsion: 1 × direct-acting steam engine; 2 × side paddlewheels
- Speed: 9 knots (17 km/h; 10 mph)
- Complement: 320
- Armament: 2 × 10 in (254 mm) Paixhans guns; 4 × 32-pdr guns; 24 × 32-pdr guns

Mecidiye was the lead ship of four wooden-hulled Mecidiye-class paddle frigates built for the Ottoman Navy in the 1840s; they were the first Ottoman-built warships powered by steam. She was modified during construction to be used as a yacht by the sultan of the Ottoman Empire. During the Crimean War, she took part in a minor, inconclusive battle with a Russian frigate but otherwise saw no further action. She saw limited service for the remainder of her career, including during the Russo-Turkish War of 1877–1878. She ended her career as a coal storage hulk and was broken up in 1903.

== Design ==
Mecdiye was a Mecidiye-class paddle frigate. She was 69.1 m (226 ft 8 in) long overall, with a beam of 11.7 m (38 ft 5 in) and a draft of 5.1 m (16 ft 9 in). Her tonnage was 1,443 tons burthen. She was propelled by a pair of paddlewheels that were driven by a direct-acting steam engine, with steam provided by two coal-fired boilers. Her propulsion system was rated at 900 indicated horsepower (670 kW) for a top speed of 9 knots (17 km/h; 10 mph). Her coal storage capacity amounted to 150 metric tons (150 long tons; 170 short tons). She had a crew of 320.

The ship was armed with a battery of two 10 in (254 mm) shell-firing Paixhans guns on the upper deck, four 32-pdr guns also on the upper deck, and twenty-four 32-pdr guns on the main deck. The guns were all of British manufacture, as Ottoman cannon foundries lacked the expertise necessary to manufacture modern shell-firing guns.

== Service history ==
Mecidiye was ordered in 1845 as part of a modest naval expansion program aimed at building the first steam-powered ships of the Ottoman Navy. Several steam yachts had been built in the 1830s, but these were primarily used by government officials and were not proper warships. She was laid down in 1846 at the Imperial Arsenal in Constantinople, and was launched that same year; during construction, the decision was made to complete her as another yacht for the sultan. She was completed in 1847 and following sea trials, was commissioned into the fleet later that year. Since steam engines were still a novelty in the Ottoman fleet, the crew had no experience operating the machinery and so four skilled engineers were contracted to train the crew. In 1848, Mecidiye and her sister ship Taif had to be pressed into service as merchant steamers carrying passengers to Samsun, as the Ottoman state-owned passenger service was not large enough to handle the volume of passengers.

=== Crimean War ===
Mecidiye saw action during the Crimean War. In September 1853, the Ottoman fleet organized three squadrons in the Black Sea as tensions with Russia rose. Mecidiye was assigned to a squadron consisting of her three sister ships, under the command of Mustafa Pasha. The squadron was tasked with patrolling the eastern Black Sea coast of the Ottoman Empire, including Circassia and Georgia. On 19 November, after the start of the war, Pasha took his squadron to Sinop to meet another squadron under Osman Pasha; while en route on 9 November, Mecidiye and the other frigates encountered the Russian frigate Flora off Pitsunda but were unable to defeat her in a seven-hour battle. They scored only two hits on the Russian vessel, inflicting no damage, while the Ottoman frigates were hit several times.

After arriving in Sinop, Mustafa attempted to convince Osman to withdraw from the exposed position, but the latter refused and his squadron was subsequently annihilated at the Battle of Sinop on 30 November. Mustafa Pasha had already sent three of his ships, including Mecidiye, back to Constantinople on 22 November. The destruction of the fleet at Sinop drastically reduced the ability of the Ottoman Navy to take an active role in the war, and thereafter the Anglo-French fleets led the effort against the Russian Black Sea Fleet.

=== Later career ===
Mecidiye had her armament reduced to four 32-pdr guns on her main deck in 1857. During the Cretan Revolt of 1866–1869; in early 1868, Mehmed Emin Âli Pasha, the Grand Vizier of the Ottoman Empire, boarded Mecidiye in Crete for the voyage back to Constantinople. By the time of the Russo-Turkish War of 1877–1878, the ship had been assigned to the Black Sea Wooden Ship Division. The ships were sent to Batumi, but they saw no combat there. In 1888, Mecidiye was towed to the Imperial Shipyard for a refit; two years later, she was reduced to serve as a coal hulk stationed in Ereğli. Six years later, she was decommissioned and eventually sold to ship breakers in Ereğli in 1903.
