= Ottoman frigate Saik-i Şadi =

Steam frigate of the Ottoman Navy

- Woodcut of Mecidiye's sister ship Feyzâ-i Bahrî visiting Southampton, United Kingdom.

History

Ottoman Empire
- Name: Saik-i Şadi
- Ordered: 1845
- Builder: Tersâne-i Âmire, Istanbul
- Laid down: 1846
- Launched: 1847
- Completed: 1847
- Out of service: 1867
- Fate: Scrapped, 1869

General characteristics (as built)
- Class & type: Mecidiye-class paddle frigate
- Tons burthen: 1,443 bm
- Length: 69.1 m (226 ft 8 in) (o/a)
- Beam: 11.7 m (38 ft 5 in)
- Draft: 5.1 m (16 ft 9 in)
- Installed power: 900 ihp (670 kW); 2 × boilers
- Propulsion: 1 × direct-acting steam engine; 2 × side paddlewheels
- Speed: 9 knots (17 km/h; 10 mph)
- Complement: 320
- Armament: 2 × 10 in (254 mm) Paixhans guns; 4 × 32-pdr guns; 24 × 32-pdr guns

Saik-i Şadi was one of four wooden-hulled Mecidiye-class paddle frigates built for the Ottoman Navy in the 1840s; they were the first Ottoman-built warships powered by steam. The ship had a relatively uneventful career; she saw limited action during the Crimean War in 1853, when she fought a small action against a Russian frigate in the Black Sea. The future Sultan, Abdülaziz, frequently used the ship as his yacht in the 1850s, but she otherwise saw little active use before being decommissioned in 1867 and broken up in 1869.

== Design ==
Saik-i Şadi was a Mecidiye-class paddle frigate. She was 69.1 m (226 ft 8 in) long overall, with a beam of 11.7 m (38 ft 5 in) and a draft of 5.1 m (16 ft 9 in). Her tonnage was 1,443 tons burthen. She was propelled by a pair of paddlewheels that were driven by a direct-acting steam engine, with steam provided by two coal-fired boilers. Her propulsion system was rated at 900 indicated horsepower (670 kW) for a top speed of 9 knots (17 km/h; 10 mph). Her coal storage capacity amounted to 150 metric tons (150 long tons; 170 short tons). She had a crew of 320.

The ship was armed with a battery of two 10 in (254 mm) shell-firing Paixhans guns on the upper deck, four 32-pdr guns also on the upper deck, and twenty-four 32-pdr guns on the main deck. The guns were all of British manufacture, as Ottoman cannon foundries lacked the expertise necessary to manufacture modern shell-firing guns.

== Service history ==
Saik-i Şadi was ordered in 1845 as part of a modest naval expansion program aimed at building the first steam-powered ships of the Ottoman Navy. Several steam yachts had been built in the 1830s, but these were primarily used by government officials and were not proper warships. She was laid down the following year at the Imperial Arsenal in Constantinople, and was launched in 1847. During construction, she was allocated for use as another yacht for Sultan Abdulmejid I. She was completed that year and following sea trials, was commissioned into the fleet that year. Since steam engines were still a novelty in the Ottoman fleet, the crew had no experience operating the machinery and so four skilled engineers were contracted to train the crew.

Saik-i Şadi saw action during the Crimean War. In September 1853, the Ottoman fleet organized three squadrons in the Black Sea as tensions with Russia rose. Saik-i Şadi was assigned to a squadron consisting of her three sister ships, under the command of Mustafa Pasha. The squadron was tasked with patrolling the eastern Black Sea coast of the Ottoman Empire, including Circassia and Georgia. On 19 November, after the start of the war, Pasha took his squadron to Sinop to meet another squadron under Osman Pasha; while en route on 9 November, Saik-i Şadi and the other frigates encountered the Russian frigate Flora off Pitsunda but were unable to defeat her in a seven-hour battle. They scored only two hits on the Russian vessel, inflicting no damage, while the Ottoman frigates were hit several times.

After arriving in Sinop, Mustafa attempted to convince Osman to withdraw from the exposed position, but the latter refused and his squadron was subsequently annihilated at the Battle of Sinop on 30 November. Mustafa Pasha had already sent three of his ships, including Feyzâ-i Bahrî, back to Constantinople on 22 November. The destruction of the fleet at Sinop drastically reduced the ability of the Ottoman Navy to take an active role in the war, and thereafter the Anglo-French fleets led the effort against the Russian Black Sea Fleet.

During the 1850s, Abdülaziz, who became sultan in 1861, frequently cruised aboard Saik-i Şadi, which was by then being used as a yacht. In 1857, the ship's armament was reduced to a battery of twelve 32-pdr guns on the main deck. She remained in service for another decade, being decommissioned in 1867 and sold for scrap two years later. She was then broken up at the Imperial Arsenal.
