= Ottoman ship Mahmudiye =

Ship of the line of the Ottoman Navy

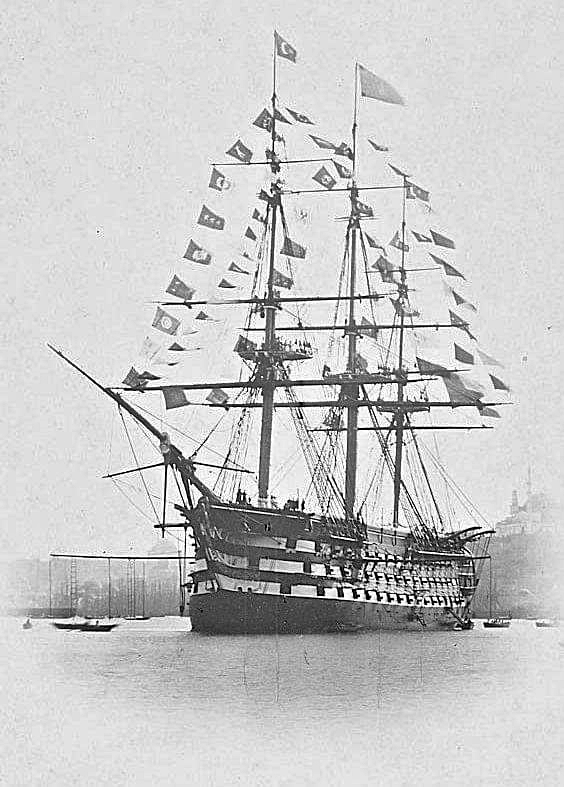
- Mahmudiye in Istanbul

History

Ottoman Empire
- Name: Mahmudiye
- Namesake: Mahmud II
- Owner: Ottoman Navy
- Builder: Imperial Arsenal, Constantinople
- Launched: 30 November 1828.
- Honours and awards: Title of Gazi awarded to the ship for her role during the Siege of Sevastopol (1854–1855)
- Fate: Broken up

General characteristics
- Displacement: unknown
- Tons burthen: 3,389 bm
- Length: 72 zira, or 65.43 m (214 ft 8 in)
- Beam: 18.19 m (59 ft 8 in)
- Armament: 1829: lower gundeck: 34 × 11 okka (31 lb shot); middle gundeck: 32 × 11 okka, 2 × 18 okka (50 lb shot); upper gundeck: 34 × 9 okka (25 lb shot); quarterdeck: 26 × 14 okka (40 lb shot)

Mahmudiye was a ship of the line of the Ottoman Navy. It was a three-masted, three-decked 128-gunned sailing ship, which could perhaps be considered to be one of the world's few completed heavy first-rate battleships. Mahmudiye, with a roaring lion as the ship's figurehead, was intended to serve to reconstitute the morale of the nation after the loss of the fleet at the Battle of Navarino in 1827. The flagship was largest in the Ottoman Navy and among the largest in the world upon her launch in 1828.

== Design and Construction ==
It was constructed by the naval architect Mehmet Kalfa and the naval engineer Mehmet Efendi on the order of Mahmud II (reigned between 1808–1839) at the Imperial Arsenal, on the Golden Horn in Constantinople. The ship was built according to Western European naval designs and had a crew of anywhere from 1,177 to 1,276 men.

As the Chargé d'Affaires to the Ottoman Empire, United States naval officer and diplomat David Porter visited the ship on numerous occasions. He remarked on the immense size of Mahmudiye, stating it was larger than the four-decker USS Pennsylvania. He also noted the ship's unusually ornate interior, writing:

Every gun on board is as bright as burnished gold; her gun-carriages are absolutely cabinet work; all the iron work about them is like polished steel, and the brass work, of which there is much, correspond-ing therewith. The beautiful polish of the rich and costly woods of which the ceiling, sides, and bulk-heads of her cabin are composed, strikes the eye with a dazzling magnificence.

The ship's wooden tiles were arranged to create mosaic-like patterns on the cabin floor.

The armament of Mahmudiye consisted of 128 long guns, measured in Turkish okka. According to Porter, the ship was armed with four guns capable of firing 500 lb (226 kg) shot on her quarterdeck; however, mention of such weapons does not appear in other contemporaneous sources. For reference, the largest smoothbore Dahlgren guns from the 1860s fired 440 lb (199kg) solid shot. (Note: During the American Civil War, some ironclad monitors were equipped with 15 inch Dahlgren guns capable of firing such projectiles; a total of 120 such weapons were manufactured between 1862-1872.)

== Operational History ==
=== Egyptian-Ottoman Wars ===
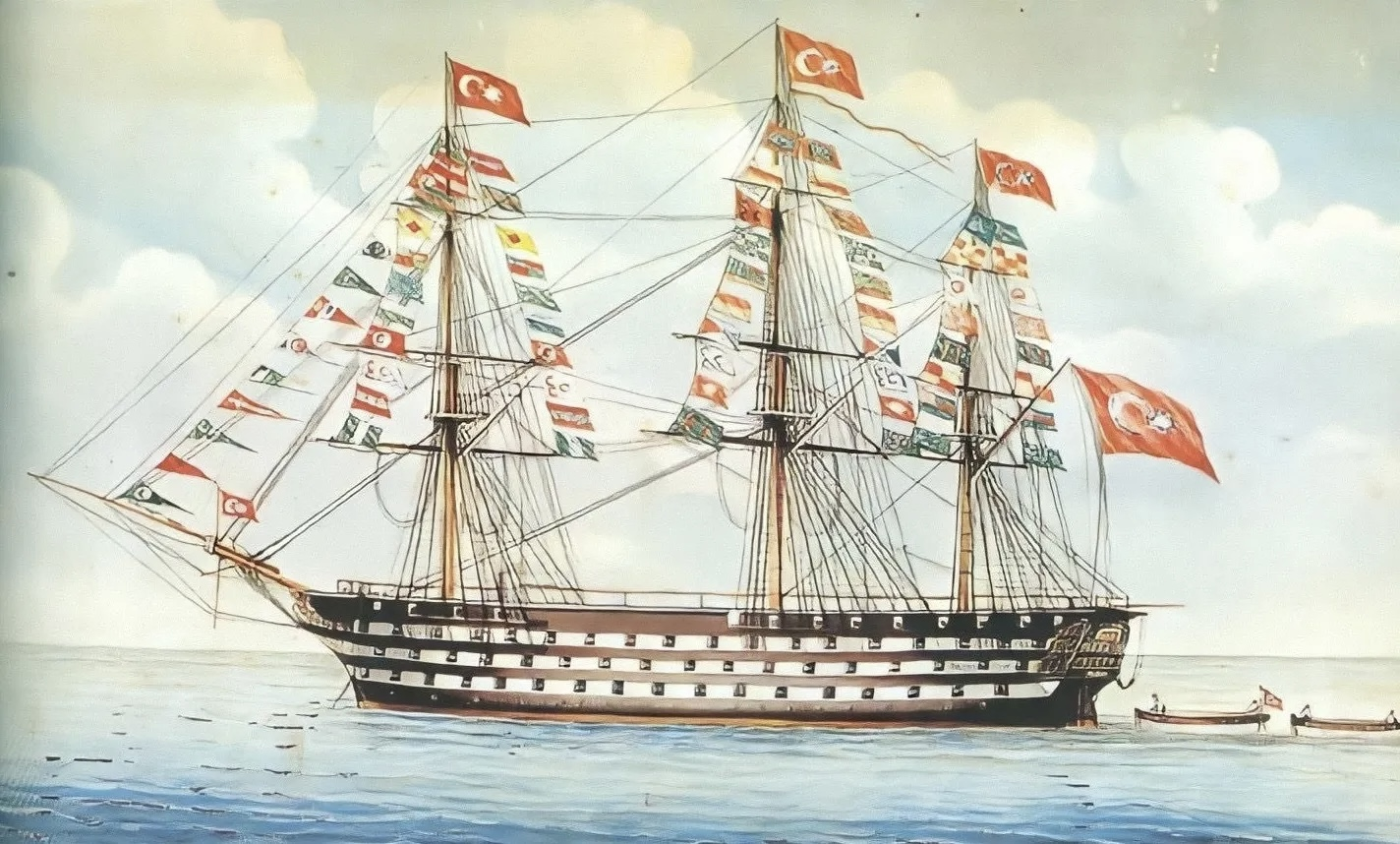
Mahmudiye

At the outbreak of the First Egyptian–Ottoman War in 1831, prompted by the Egyptian invasion of Palestine, Mahmudiye was already in poor condition, despite being only a few years old. Much of her hull was dry-rotted, though it still served as the Ottoman flagship during the war. During the war, the Ottoman fleet, along with a squadron from the British Royal Navy blockaded the main Egyptian naval base at İskenderun. This included a long-range bombardment on 18 August 1831. The war ended in 1833 following the intervention of Russia on behalf of the Ottoman government and pressure from Britain, France, and Austria on Egypt to withdraw, but unresolved tensions between the Eyalet of Egypt and the central government resulted in the Second Egyptian–Ottoman War of 1839–1841.

After the death of Sultan Mahmud II on 1 July 1839, an internal power struggle resulted in the installation of the pro-Russian Koca Hüsrev Mehmed Pasha under Sultan Abdulmejid I. On 4 July 1839, the commander of the Ottoman fleet, displeased over the Russian influence in the new government, decided to take the bulk of the Ottoman fleet, including Mahmudiye, over to the Egyptian side. He set sail for Beşik Bay, where an international fleet composed of British, French, and Russian warships was present. With assistance from the pro-Egyptian French, he then moved the fleet to Kos, where he entered into negotiations with Egypt to accept the fleet at İskenderun on 14 July. A year later, in July 1840, the British issued an ultimatum for Egypt to return the ships and surrender the Levant to the Ottoman government; the Egyptians refused, and so the Royal Navy bombarded all of the major ports in the region, culminating in the Bombardment of Acre on 1 November. This forced the Egyptians to capitulate, and on 27 November Mahmudiye and the rest of the Ottoman ships were released to return to Constantinople.

=== Later career ===
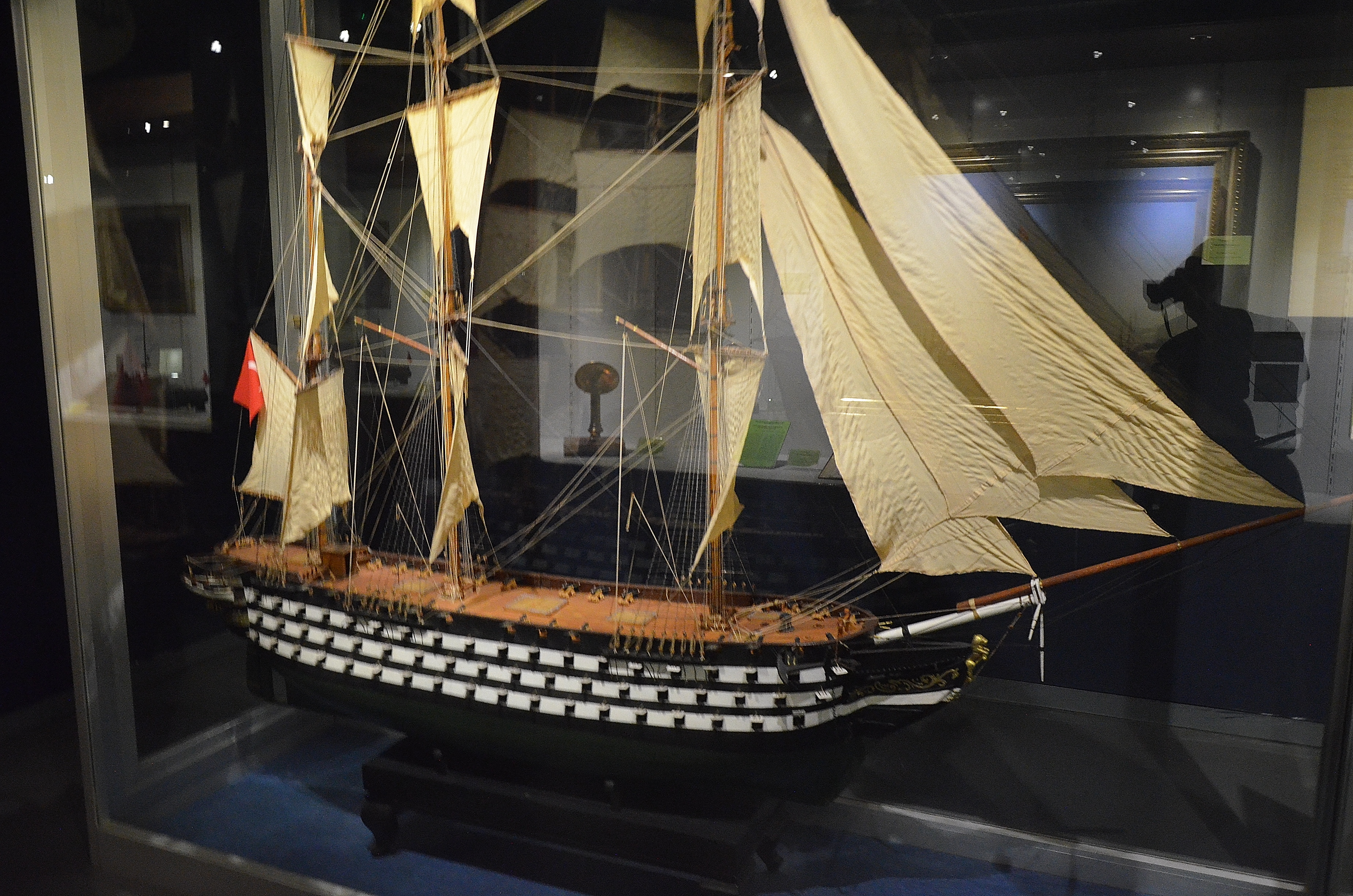
Model of the Mahmudiye at the Istanbul Naval Museum

Mahmudiye participated in the Siege of Sevastopol (1854–55) during the Crimean War (1854–56) under the command of Admiral of the Fleet Kayserili Ahmet Pasha. It was honored with the title Gazi following her successful mission in Sevastopol.

With the introduction of steam power at the end of the 1840s, the conversion of the pure sail-driven ship into a steamer was considered. On inspecting the hull in Britain in the late 1850s, however, it was discovered to be badly rotted, and not worth reconstructing. The machinery that had been allocated to Mahmudiye was instead installed on the frigate Mubir-i Sürur.

During the Russo-Turkish War of 1877–1878, Mahmudiye was placed into service as a troop transport, as the government lacked sufficient transport ships. The ship's great size made her an effective transport, owing to her ability to carry a large number of troops. On 27 December, four Russian torpedo boats attacked Mahmudiye and the ironclad Asar-i Tevfik while they were moored in Batumi, but all of their attacks missed.
