= Ottoman frigate Mubir-i Sürur =

Steam frigate of the Ottoman Navy

History

Ottoman Empire
- Name: Mubir-i Sürur
- Ordered: 1846
- Builder: Tersâne-i Âmire, Istanbul
- Laid down: 1846
- Launched: 1847
- Completed: 1848
- Decommissioned: 1899
- Out of service: 1894
- Fate: Scrapped, 1904

General characteristics (as built)
- Class & type: Steam frigate
- Tons burthen: 1,443 bm
- Length: 69.5 m (228 ft 0 in) (o/a)
- Beam: 12 m (39 ft 4 in)
- Draft: 5 m (16 ft 5 in)
- Installed power: 2 × boilers; 900 ihp (670 kW)
- Propulsion: 1 × marine steam engine; 1 × screw
- Speed: 10 knots (19 km/h; 12 mph)
- Complement: 350
- Armament: 22 × 60-pdr guns

Mubir-i Sürur was a steam frigate of the Ottoman Navy built in the 1840s. Originally ordered by the Eyalet of Egypt as Sarkiye, upon completion she was presented as a gift to Sultan Abdulmejid I and was renamed on entering service in the Ottoman fleet in 1850. She had a relatively uneventful career, avoiding any active service during the Crimean War in 1853–1855. She was used to patrol for Greek blockade runners during the Cretan Revolt in 1866, and was reduced to a training ship in 1873. She returned to active service in 1877 following the outbreak of the Russo-Turkish War, during which she was used to ferry Ottoman troops around the Black Sea. The ship remained in service until 1885, when she was reduced to a storage hulk; she was ultimately broken up in 1904.

== Design ==
Mubir-i Sürur was 69.5 m (228 ft) long overall, with a beam of 12 m (39 ft 4 in) and a draft of 5 m (16 ft 5 in). Her tonnage was 1,477 tons burthen. She had a crew of 350 officers and enlisted men. The ship was armed with a battery of twenty-two 60-pounder guns arranged on the broadside.

She was propelled by a horizontal, two-cylinder steam engine that drove a single screw propeller; the engine was manufactured by Miller & Ravenhill. Steam was provided by two coal-fired boilers. Her propulsion system was rated at 900 indicated horsepower (670 kW) for a top speed of 10 knots (19 km/h; 12 mph). Her coal storage capacity amounted to 200 metric tons (200 long tons; 220 short tons).

== Service history ==
The ship was ordered and laid down in 1846 by the Eyalet of Egypt, then a province of the Ottoman Empire. She was launched the following year and began sea trials in 1848 without her steam propulsion system. The ship was originally commissioned in 1848 as Sarkiye for the Egyptian fleet; she then went to Britain where her steam engine was installed in 1849. Now complete, she was presented to Sultan Abdulmejid I and she was commissioned into the Ottoman fleet in 1850, now renamed Mubir-i Sürur, which means "informer of happiness". The ship was the first screw-driven vessel of the Ottoman fleet.

Mubir-i Sürur did not see action during the Crimean War of 1853–1855. In some sources, the ship is included in the squadron commanded by Mustafa Pasha (Adolphus Slade), but the historian Candan Badem notes that Slade did not record the ship as having been under his command and therefore discounts those reports that include her. The historians Bernd Langensiepen and Ahmet Güleryüz concur with this assessment. After the war, the Ottoman Navy planned to refit the old sail ship of the line Mahmudiye with steam engines, but on inspection of the ship, it was determined that she had badly rotted and was not worth refitting. The engines that had been ordered were instead used to replace Mubir-i Sürur's worn-out machinery. At the start of the Cretan Revolt in early 1866, Mubir-i Sürur was stationed in İzmir; she was assigned to the European Division under Ferik Ethem Pasha. The division was used to patrol for Greek blockade runners supplying arms to the insurgents on Crete. By 1869, she had been transferred to the 3rd Squadron in the Asiatic Division. In 1873, the vessel was reduced to a training ship for naval cadets.

The Ottoman fleet began mobilizing in September 1876 to prepare for a conflict with Russia, as tensions with the country had been growing for several years, an insurrection had begun in Ottoman Bosnia in mid-1875, and Serbia had declared war on the Ottoman Empire in July 1876. The Russo-Turkish War began on 24 April 1877 with a Russian declaration of war. Mubir-i Sürur was assigned to the Black Sea Wooden Ship Division. In May, Mubir-i Sürur, the ironclad warship Asar-i Şevket, and several transport ships steamed to Batumi. Mubir-i Sürur later moved to Sochum, before departing there on 31 July in company with the ironclads Feth-i Bülend and Mukaddeme-i Hayir and three other vessels for Trabzon. From there, they carried ground troops to Varna to defend against an expected Russian attack across the Danube.

She returned to training duties after the war, and was used in that capacity until 1885, when she was converted into a torpedo storage hulk. She underwent a refit at the Imperial Arsenal in Constantinople in 1892, which included a reduction of her armament to a pair of 65 mm (2.6 in) quick-firing guns manufactured by Krupp. and was subsequently laid up in 1894. Five years later she was decommissioned, and in 1904 she was sold to ship breakers and dismantled.
