= Ottoman frigate Feyzâ-i Bahrî =

Mecidiye-class paddle frigate built for the Ottoman Navy

- Woodcut of Feyzâ-i Bahrî visiting Southampton, United Kingdom.

History

Ottoman Empire
- Name: Feyzâ-i Bahrî
- Ordered: 1845
- Builder: Tersâne-i Âmire, Istanbul
- Laid down: 1846
- Launched: 1848
- Completed: 1848
- Out of service: 1878
- Reclassified: As a transport, 1867
- Fate: Scrapped, 1880

General characteristics (as built)
- Class & type: Mecidiye-class paddle frigate
- Tons burthen: 1,443 bm
- Length: 69.1 m (226 ft 8 in) (o/a)
- Beam: 11.7 m (38 ft 5 in)
- Draft: 5.1 m (16 ft 9 in)
- Installed power: 900 ihp (670 kW); 2 × boilers
- Propulsion: 1 × direct-acting steam engine; 2 × side paddlewheels
- Speed: 9 knots (17 km/h; 10 mph)
- Complement: 320
- Armament: 2 × 10 in (254 mm) Paixhans guns; 4 × 32-pdr guns; 24 × 32-pdr guns

Feyzâ-i Bahrî was one of four wooden-hulled Mecidiye-class paddle frigates built for the Ottoman Navy in the 1840s; they were the first Ottoman-built warships powered by steam. She served with the fleet until 1867, including during the Crimean War, where she saw a minor battle with a Russian frigate in the Black Sea. Feyzâ-i Bahrî ferried soldiers to Crete during the Cretan Revolt in 1866 and was converted into a dedicated transport vessel the following year. She served in that capacity until 1878 when she was decommissioned, being broken up in 1880.

== Design ==
Feyzâ-i Bahrî was a Mecidiye-class paddle frigate. She was 69.1 m (226 ft 8 in) long overall, with a beam of 11.7 m (38 ft 5 in) and a draft of 5.1 m (16 ft 9 in). Her tonnage was 1,443 tons burthen. She was propelled by a pair of paddlewheels that were driven by a direct-acting steam engine, with steam provided by two coal-fired boilers. Her propulsion system was rated at 900 indicated horsepower (670 kW) for a top speed of 9 knots (17 km/h; 10 mph). Her coal storage capacity amounted to 150 metric tons (150 long tons; 170 short tons). She had a crew of 320.

The ship was armed with a battery of two 10 in (254 mm) shell-firing Paixhans guns on the upper deck, four 32-pdr guns also on the upper deck, and twenty-four 32-pdr guns on the main deck. The guns were all of British manufacture, as Ottoman cannon foundries lacked the expertise necessary to manufacture modern shell-firing guns.

== History ==
Feyzâ-i Bahrî was ordered in 1845 as part of a modest naval expansion program aimed at building the first steam-powered ships of the Ottoman Navy. Several steam yachts had been built in the 1830s, but these were primarily used by government officials and were not proper warships. She was laid down the following year at the Imperial Arsenal in Constantinople, and was launched in 1848. She was completed that year and following sea trials, was commissioned into the fleet that year. Since steam engines were still a novelty in the Ottoman fleet, the crew had no experience operating the machinery and so four skilled engineers were contracted to train the crew.

The ship went to Great Britain in May 1851; she was the first Ottoman steam warship to visit the country. The voyage from Constantinople to Southampton took fourteen days, including a two-day stop at Gibraltar on the way. At that time, she still had three British engineers aboard to assist the crew. From Southampton, the ship proceeded to Woolwich and then to Spithead, where she met two other Ottoman vessels, one of which was the sail frigate Mirat-ı Zafer, and elements of the British Royal Navy, including the flagship HMS Victory, with which she exchanged salutes. From Spithead, she steamed down the English Channel to Devonport, arriving on 4 July. She remained there for four days before departing for home. In December that year, she assisted in the refloating of the British steamship Arabia, which had run aground off Smyrna.

=== Crimean War ===
Feyzâ-i Bahrî saw action during the Crimean War. In September 1853, the Ottoman fleet organized three squadrons in the Black Sea as tensions with Russia rose. Feyzâ-i Bahrî was assigned to a squadron consisting of her three sister ships, under the command of Mustafa Pasha. The squadron was tasked with patrolling the eastern Black Sea coast of the Ottoman Empire, including Circassia and Georgia. On 19 November, after the start of the war, Pasha took his squadron to Sinop to meet another squadron under Osman Pasha; while en route on 9 November, Feyzâ-i Bahrî and the other frigates encountered the Russian frigate Flora off Pitsunda but were unable to defeat her in a seven-hour battle. They scored only two hits on the Russian vessel, inflicting no damage, while the Ottoman frigates were hit several times.

After arriving in Sinop, Mustafa attempted to convince Osman to withdraw from the exposed position, but the latter refused and his squadron was subsequently annihilated at the Battle of Sinop on 30 November. Mustafa Pasha had already sent three of his ships, including Feyzâ-i Bahrî, back to Constantinople on 22 November. The destruction of the fleet at Sinop drastically reduced the ability of the Ottoman Navy to take an active role in the war, and thereafter the Anglo-French fleets led the effort against the Russian Black Sea Fleet.

=== Later career ===
In 1857, the ship's armament was reduced to a battery of twelve 32-pdr guns on the main deck. In early 1866, the Cretan Revolt broke out on the island of Crete. Greek nationalists on the island sought independence from the Ottoman Empire and union with Greece. To support the campaign to restore Ottoman control, the ship carried troops to the island in November, escorted by the sloop Ismail. She was disarmed in 1867 and converted into a transport. She was assigned to the Danube Squadron at the start of the Russo-Turkish War in 1877. The ship was decommissioned in 1878 and scrapped two years later.

== Bibliography ==
- "Arrival of the Turkish Frigate "Feiza Baari"". The Illustrated London News. Vol. XVIII, no. 481. 3 May 1851. OCLC 985512101.
- Badem, Candan (2010). The Ottoman Crimean War: (1853–1856). Leiden: Brill. ISBN 978-90-04-18205-9.
- "Correspondence from the Principal Ports and Stations". Colburn's United Service Magazine and Naval and Military Journal. London: Colburn & Co. 1851. OCLC 18714726.
- Langensiepen, Bernd & Güleryüz, Ahmet (1995). The Ottoman Steam Navy 1828–1923. London: Conway Maritime Press. ISBN 978-0-85177-610-1.
- Tredrea, John; Sozaev, Eduard (2010). Russian Warships in the Age of Sail 1696–1860: Design, Construction, Careers and Fates. Barnsley: Seaforth. ISBN 978-1-84832-058-1.
