= Adolphus Slade =

British and Ottoman admiral (1804–1877)

Admiral Sir Adolphus Slade CB (1804 – 13 November 1877) was a British admiral who became an admiral in the Ottoman Navy. While in Ottoman service he was known as Mushaver (Inspector) Pasha

He was the fifth son of General Sir John Slade.

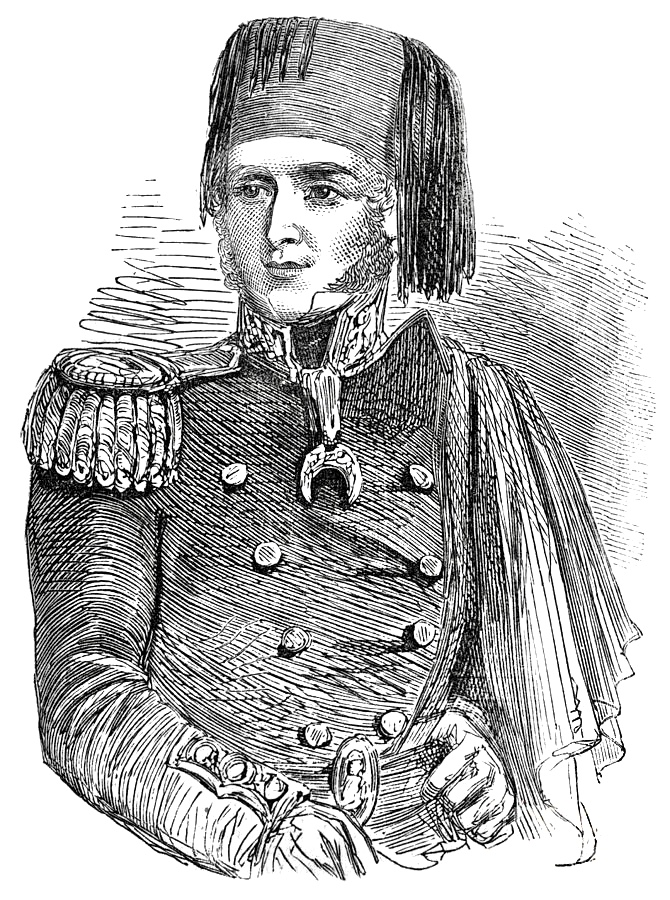
Adolphus Slade as Mushaver Pasha in Ottoman service during the Crimean War.

== Career ==
- 1815: Entered Navy
- 1827: Lieutenant
- 1841: Commander
- 1849: Captain
- 1849–1866: Admiral in the Turkish navy, with the title of Pasha. This included the Crimean War. In 1854, his flagship was a 72-gun frigate.
- 1858: KCB
- 1866: Rear-Admiral
- 1867: Retired Rear-Admiral
- 1873: Retired Vice-Admiral

== Books ==
Slade, who has been described as "one of the best nineteenth-century writers on the Middle East", wrote a number of books:

- Records of travels in Turkey, Greece, &c. and of a Cruise in the Black Sea, with the Capitan Pasha, in the years 1829,1830, and 1831 (1833)
- Turkey, Greece and Malta (1837)
- The sultan and Mehemet Ali; or, The present crisis in Turkey. (1839)
- Travels in Germany and Russia: including a steam voyage by the Danube and the Euxine from Vienna to Constantinople, in 1838-39 (1840)
- A Few Words on Naval Construction and Naval promotion. (1846)
- Maritime States and Military Navies (1859)
- Turkey and the Crimean War: a narrative of historical events (1867)
- An Historical Catechism of the Church of England, from the Apostles' times to the mission of St. Augustine. Compiled chiefly for the young (1883).

== See also ==
- O'Byrne, William Richard (1849). "Slade, Adolphus" . A Naval Biographical Dictionary . John Murray – via Wikisource.
