= Imperial Arsenal =

Ottoman shipyard

- Tersâne-i Âmire
- Golden Horn, Constantinople in Ottoman Empire
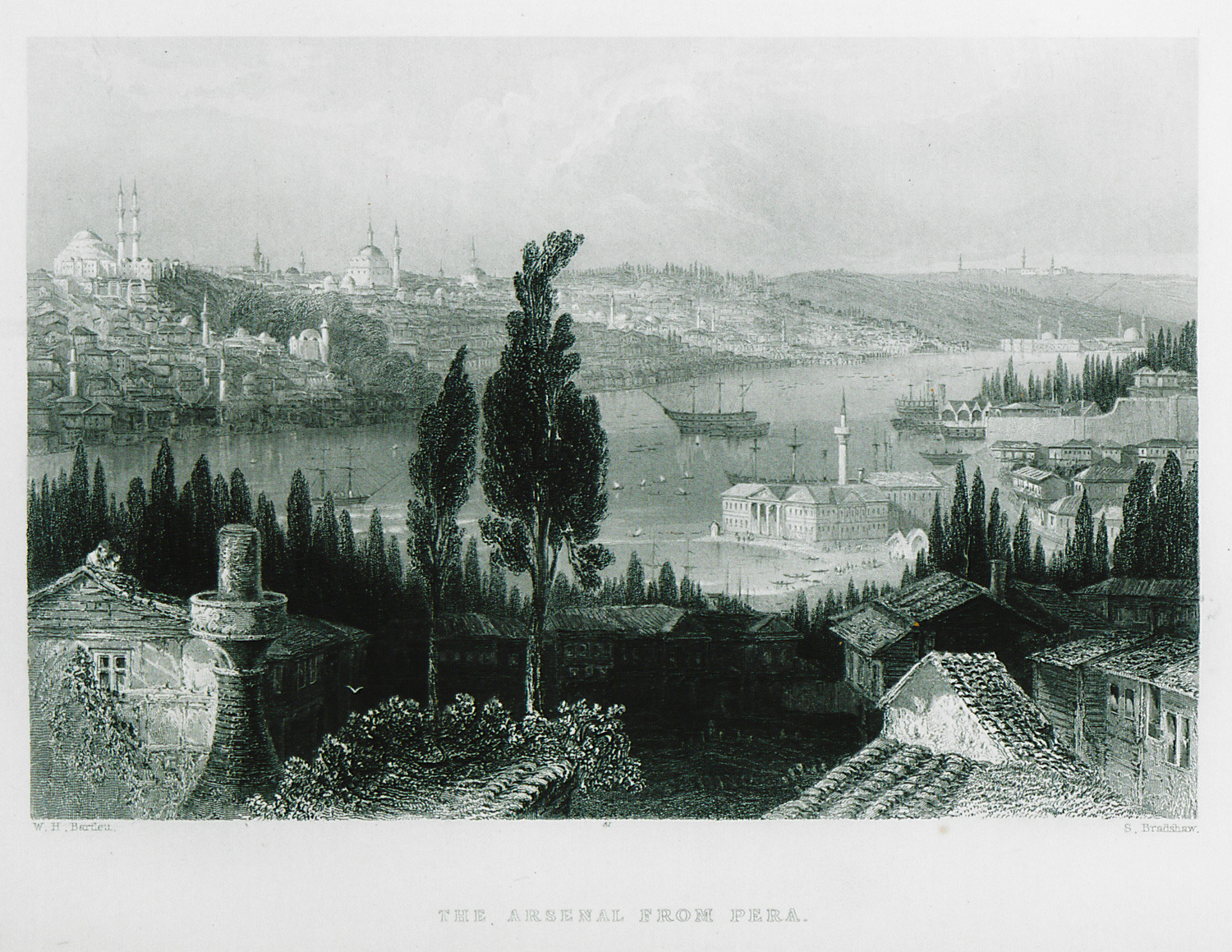
- View of the Arsenal from Pera, 1836

Site information
- Type: Naval base and shipyard
- Owner: Ottoman Navy

Location
- Coordinates: 41°02′01″N 28°57′27″E

Site history
- Built: 1454
- Fate: Replaced by the civilian Haliç Tersaneleri

The Imperial Arsenal (Ottoman Turkish: Tersâne-i Âmire) was the main base and naval shipyard of the Ottoman Empire from the 16th century to the end of the Empire. It was located on the Golden Horn in the Ottoman capital, Constantinople (modern Istanbul).

== Etymology ==
The Ottoman Turks used the word liman (from Greek limēn) to refer to harbours in general, but in the 15th century they also adopted and increasingly began to use the term tersane (often misinterpreted as tershane, incorporating the term hane, "house") from Italian darsena, "shipyard"—likewise the origin of the English "arsenal"—which in turn derived from the Arabic dār al-sināʿa.

== History ==
In the course of their expansion, the Ottomans captured a number of ports and shipyards on both the Aegean and the Black Sea shores, such as those of Iznikmid (Nicomedia, modern İzmit), Gemlik (Cius), and Aydincik (Kyzikos). The main naval base and arsenal of the Ottoman navy during the early period, however, was at Gallipoli, which was definitively occupied by the Ottomans in 1377.

After the Fall of Constantinople in 1453, Sultan Mehmed II (r. 1444–1446, 1451–1481) established an imperial shipyard across the Golden Horn from Constantinople proper, in the formerly Genoese suburb of Galata, probably on the same site as the Genoese vetus tersana ("old shipyard"). Work on the new arsenal was completed under the reign of Mehmed's successor Bayezid II (r. 1481–1512), but in winter 1513/4 Selim I (r. 1512–1520) began a major expansion, for which 200,000 ducats were allocated by the treasury. In addition to shipyards, covered dry docks were built to facilitate maintenance of warships during winter. By 1515, with 160 docks constructed, the Galata arsenal had surpassed Gallipoli, and the main Ottoman naval base was moved there. In the 1526 map of Piri Reis, the arsenal is shown as a continuous line of docks lining the northern shore of the Golden Horn, from the gate of Azab Kapisi to the vicinity of Hasköy. The name "Tershane" was officially applied to the Galata shipyard at about the same time.

In 1546–49, Sokollu Mehmed Pasha built a small stone storehouse, with a flat, lead-covered roof, behind each dock, for the storing of the ship's gear and shipbuilding materials. He also walled off the arsenal grounds from their landward side to conceal its activity from prying eyes. In addition, during this period the arsenal contained a storehouse for oars, the "store of the seventy captains" housing equipment for 70 ships and seven other storehouses, the offices (divanhane) of the Kapudan Pasha (the fleet's chief admiral), the powder magazine tower, the Sanbola dungeon, the Cirid Meydan pavilion, the gates of Şahkulu and the Meyyit harbour. By 1557, the arsenal counted 123 docks. Following the destruction of the Ottoman fleet in the Battle of Lepanto (1571), the Imperial Arsenal was extensively renovated, with eight new dockyards built inland, surrounding the royal garden (has bahçe). By the end of the 16th century, two large storehouses had been built: the Kurşunlu storehouse, for shipbuilding and rigging materials and other ship equipment, and a storehouse for timber.

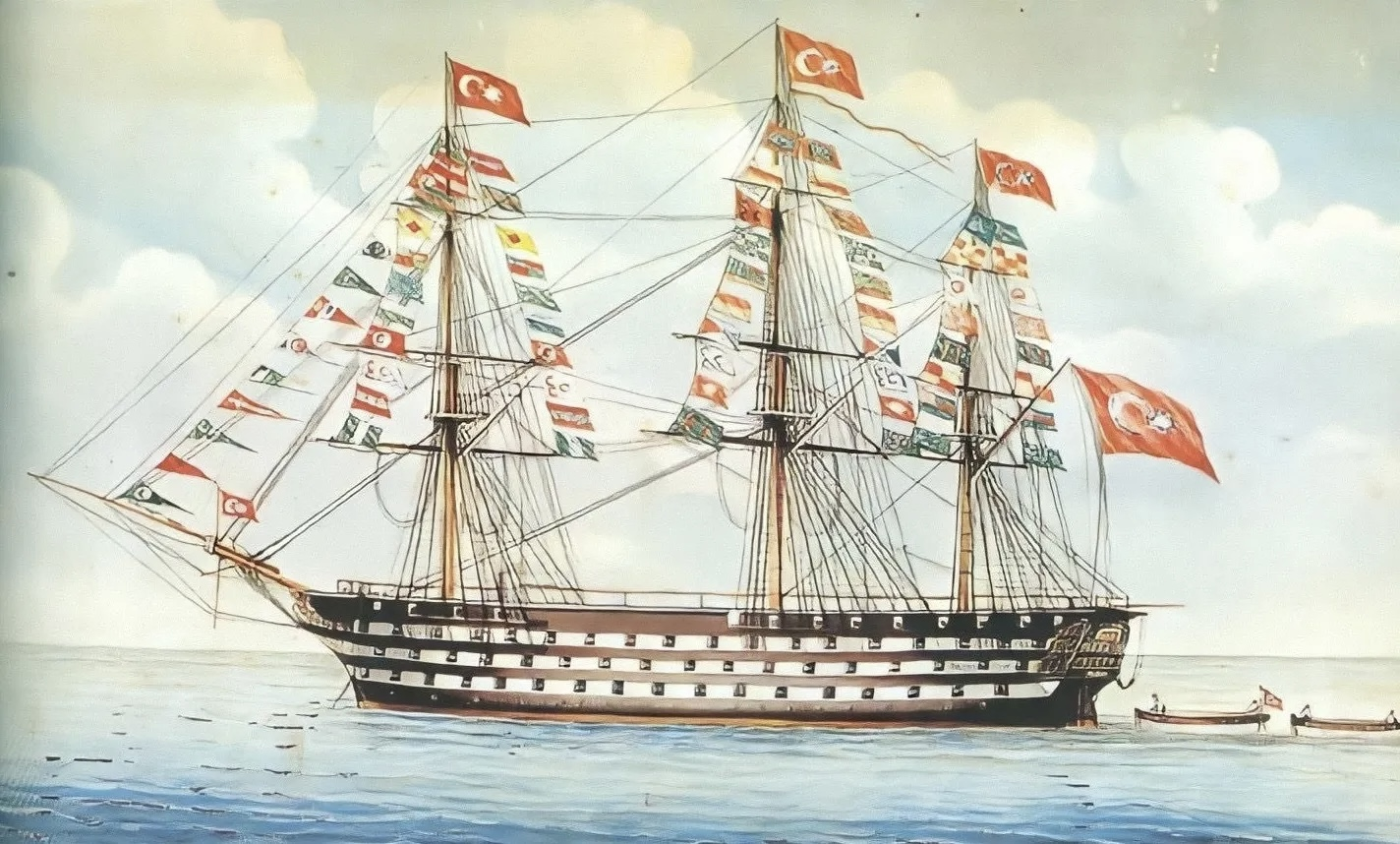
Mahmudiye (1829), built by the Imperial Arsenal, was for many years the largest warship in the world

By the mid-17th century, the number of docks had risen to 140. At its peak in the 16th and 17th centuries, the Imperial Arsenal was a major industrial concern, "with dry docks, shipyards, storehouses, a spinning mill for making cordage, and iron foundries (for making anchors), supplemented by public buildings, including a mosque, fountains, a hospital, and a prison, all clustered in the Golden Horn". Nevertheless, the 17th century saw decline: in 1601 the shipyard had 3524 employees but this number steadily fell, reaching 726 in 1700. During this period an increasing amount of work was done by other shipyards. This was facilitated by the fact that galleys, which formed the bulk of the Ottoman navy until the late 17th century, could be built by any skilled shipwright, and that consequently they were frequently built in the provinces at coastal or river sites, and only brought to the Imperial Arsenal for outfitting.

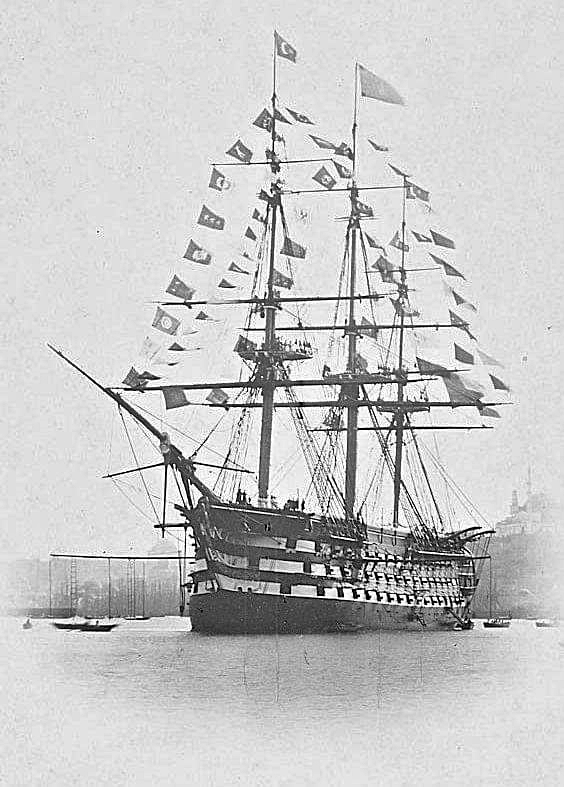
The Mahmudiye

With the introduction of galleons in the late 17th century, and later with steamships and ironclads, this was no longer possible, and the Empire's shipbuilding efforts were concentrated in the Imperial Arsenal at Galata. However, during the 18th century the warships built there were not of high quality, as displayed during the confrontations with the Imperial Russian Navy during the Russo-Turkish War of 1768–74. This resulted in another round of reforms under the Kapudan Pasha Cezayirli Gazi Hasan Pasha, including the establishment of a naval engineering school in 1775/6 (Hendese Odası, later the Mühendishane-i Bahr-i Hümâyûn). At the same time, French naval experts were called to teach Ottoman shipwrights new techniques: the engineers Le Roi and Durest, and, in 1793, Jacques-Balthazard le Brun, who built several vessels for Sultan Selim III (r. 1789–1807). In addition, a modern hospital was built within the Arsenal in 1805, followed by the first medical academy (Tibhane) in 1806. A great dry-dock for the maintenance of modern ships of the line was built in 1797–1800, a second in 1821–25, and a third in 1857–70.

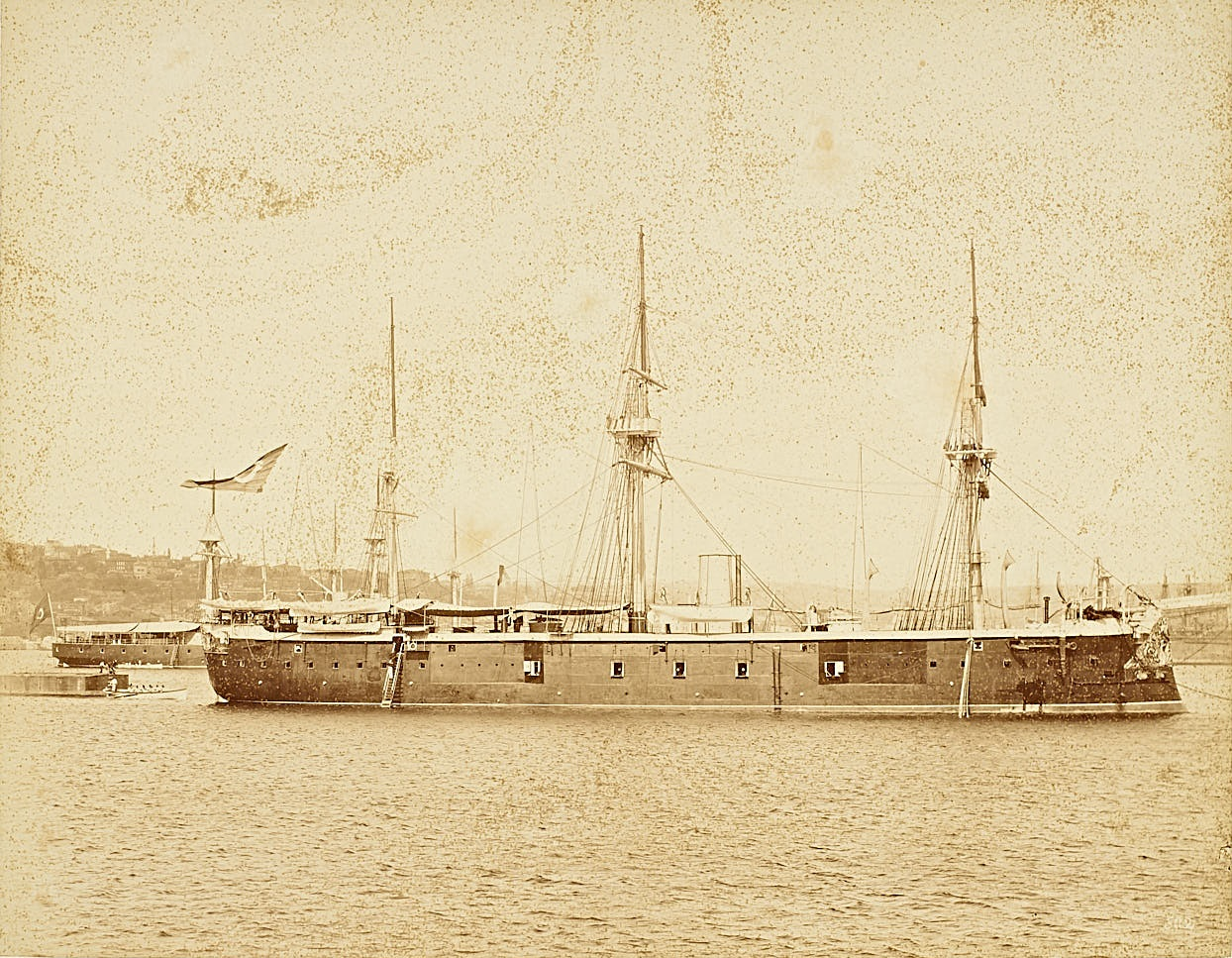
The ironclad, Hamidiye

In 1838, under the auspices of the American Foster Rhodes, the Imperial Arsenal produced its first steamship. By the reign of Abdülmecid I (r. 1839–1861), the Imperial Arsenal had fallen into neglect and underinvestment; Abdülmecid started a massive investment programme which modernised not just the Imperial Arsenal but also shipyards in Izmit and Gemlik.

During the bombings of Istanbul, the area suffered due to the British planes. The facilities are still in use today and go by the common name "Haliç Shipyards". Camialtı Shipyard, Taşkızak Shipyard and The Haliç Shipyard are three distinct facilities. Only Haliç Shipyard is now in operation out of these three shipyards. Haliç Shipyard is the oldest shipyard in continuous operation in the world.

== Administration ==
The Imperial Arsenal was under the direct supervision of the Kapudan Pasha, and its administration was headed by three officials: the kethüda, the agha, and the emin. The emin was the chief fiscal officer, and hence the most important official; his staff kept the inventories and records of all the Arsenal establishments and was responsible for expenditure. There was also an additional record office with a reis ("head") of the Arsenal, a reis of the harbour, the çavuş of the Arsenal, and superintendents of the registers. Directors were typically assigned for two years, and were well paid, at 5000 akçes. The secretary of the shipyard - the head of the accounting department - was also responsible to the defterdar (one of the treasury ministers). Records were kept in the merdiban system. Special accounts were kept for wood (vital in all aspects of shipbuilding) and also for slaves and convicts (who were treated as a resource; either working in the shipyard or oarsmen on the ships). Many materials were bought in from other parts of the empire; rope from Egypt, pitch from Thrace, ironmongery from Bulgaria.

In the Age of Sail (late 17th–mid-19th centuries), each ship's superintendent, treasurer and scribe were also considered as part of the officer corps, while "captains, mariners, overseers, messengers, shipwrights, caulkers, oar makers, ironsmiths, repairmen, spoolers, towmen, grenade-makers, guards, and retired personnel" comprised the numerous "common folk" of the Arsenal.

As part of Selim III's military reforms, the tersane emini was replaced in 1804 by the Ministry of Naval Affairs (Umur-ı Bahriye Nezareti), while a modern financial department and treasury were created for the Arsenal in the next year. In 1845, the separate Ministry of the Imperial Arsenal (Tersane-i Amire Nezareti) was created.

== See also ==
- Taşkızak Naval Shipyard

== Sources ==
- Bostan, İdris (2015). "Imperial Arsenal". In Fleet, Kate; Krämer, Gudrun; Matringe, Denis; Nawas, John; Rowson, Everett (eds.). Encyclopaedia of Islam, 3rd Edition. Brill Online.
- Imber, Colin (2000). "Tersâne". In Bearman, P. J.; Bianquis, Th.; Bosworth, C. E.; van Donzel, E. & Heinrichs, W. P. (eds.). The Encyclopaedia of Islam, Second Edition. Volume X: T–U. Leiden: E. J. Brill. p. 420. ISBN 978-90-04-11211-7.
- Langensiepen, Bernd; Güleryüz, Ahmet (1995). The Ottoman Steam Navy, 1828–1923. Conway Maritime Press. ISBN 0-85177-610-8.
