= List of battleships of the Ottoman Empire =

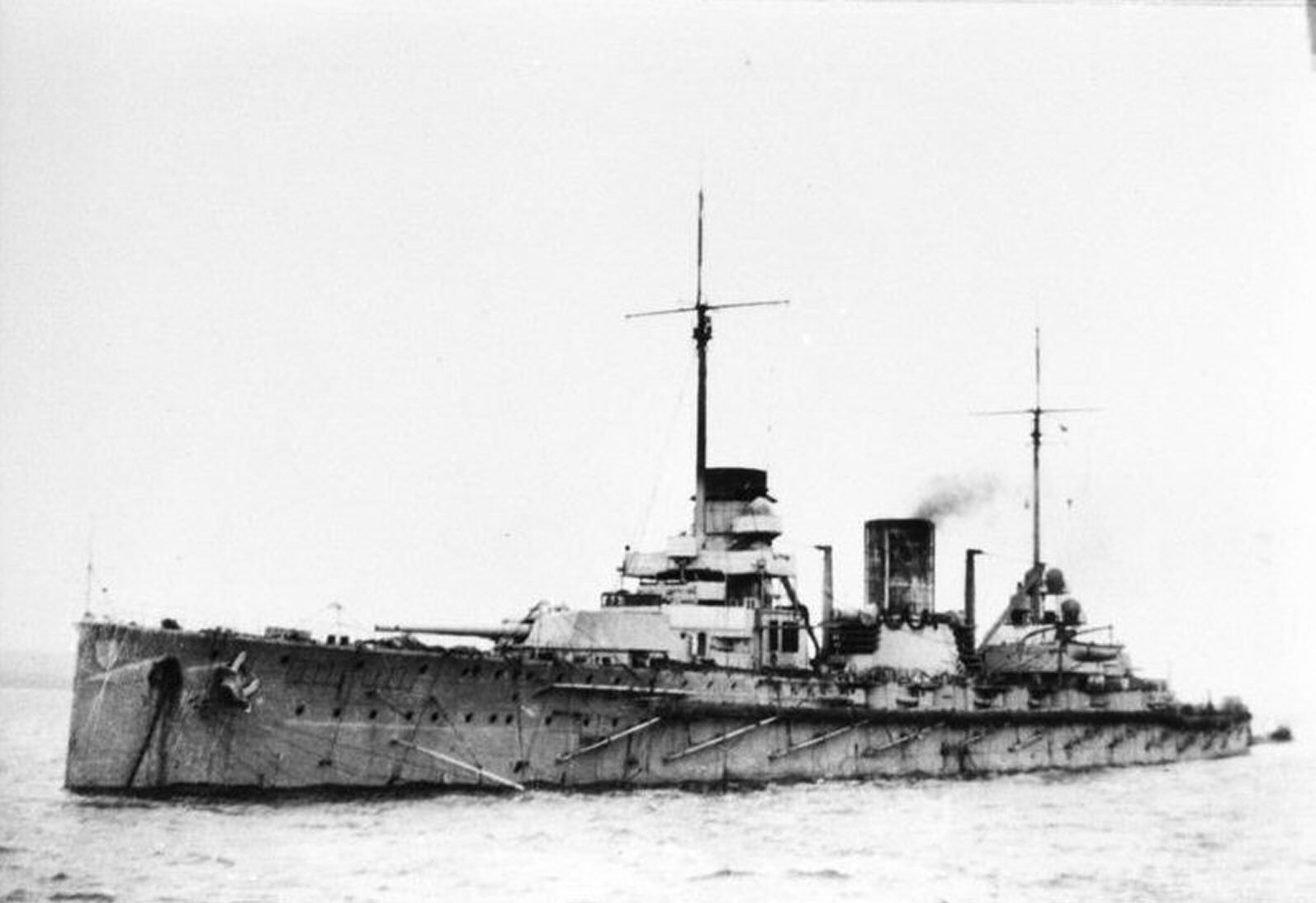
SMS Goeben, in port in 1911. It became Yavûz Sultân Selîm in 1914, and served the Ottoman and Turkish navies for over half a century.

In the aftermath of the Young Turk Revolution in 1908, the Committee of Union and Progress that had taken control of the Ottoman Empire began to draw up plans to strengthen the Ottoman Navy. The poor condition of the fleet was clearly visible in the Ottoman Naval Parade of 1910. Attempts to construct Ottoman-made battleships such as Abdül Kadir had ended in failure, so the Ottoman Navy Foundation was established with the aim of purchasing new ships through public donations rather than having them built locally. Despite these efforts, the fleet remained in a poor state. Its inability to respond to naval threats was evident in the First Balkan War (1913), when the Ottoman Navy was defeated in two separate engagements by the Greek Navy, during the battles of Elli and Lemnos.

Following the conclusion of the Balkan Wars, a naval race began in the Balkans between Greece and the Ottoman Empire. In order to update the fleet, the Ottoman Navy Foundation purchased larger battleships such as Sultân Osmân-ı Evvel, and ordered three planned Reşadiye-class battleships, including the purchase of one that had already been built, the Reşadiye. The United Kingdom confiscated the ships at the outbreak of World War I though only two were nearing completion, Sultân Osmân-ı Evvel and Reşadiye. Upon confiscation, Sultân Osmân-ı Evvel was renamed HMS Agincourt while Reşadiye was renamed HMS Erin. The seizure of these battleships by the Royal Navy outraged the Ottoman people, since public donations had been the source of most of the funds for the ships. The German Empire took advantage of the situation by sending the battlecruiser SMS Goeben and the light cruiser SMS Breslau to the Ottoman capital of Constantinople in 1914, and handing them over to the Ottoman Navy. These two ships entered service as Yavûz Sultân Selîm and Midilli respectively. The British seizure of these ships as well as the transfer of German ships to the Ottoman Navy significantly contributed to the Ottoman Empire's decision to enter World War I on the side of Germany and the Central Powers a few months later.

During World War I, many of the Ottoman battleships saw little or no action. (Note: Mesûdiye is not included in this list as she was constructed as a central battery ironclad and later re-constructed into a pre-dreadnought design. (See Sondhaus, p. 218)) Since many were in a poor condition, they simply remained at their moorings for most of the war. Out of all the battleships legally owned by the Ottoman Empire at the beginning of the war, half were either scrapped or were seized by the British in the early days of the conflict. Abdül Kadir was scrapped in 1914, while Barbaros Hayreddin was sunk in 1915. Turgut Reis survived the conflict and was scrapped in the 1950s. Of the three planned Reşadiye-class ships, only one, Reşadiye, was ever built, with the rest being cancelled just before the war. Reşadiye was one of the ships seized by the British in August 1914. Sultân Osmân-ı Evvel, which had been bought from Brazil in 1913, was also seized by Britain in August 1914. The last battleship in the Ottoman Navy, Yavûz Sultân Selîm, survived the war and was scrapped in 1973.

== Key ==
Main guns	Number and type of the main battery guns
Displacement	Ship displacement at full combat load
Propulsion	Number of shafts, type of propulsion system, and top speed generated
Service	Dates work began and finished on the ship and its ultimate fate
Laid down	Date the keel began to be assembled
Launched	Date the ship was launched
Commissioned	Date the ship was commissioned

== Abdül Kadir ==
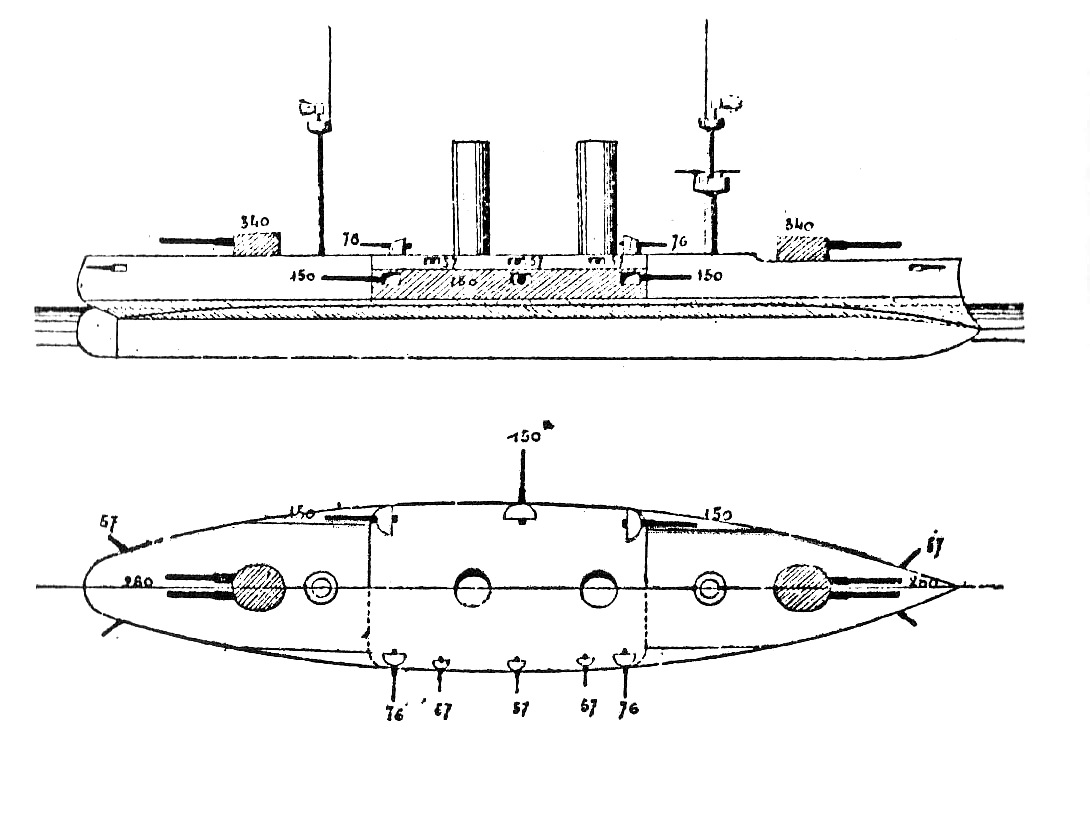
Design drawing of Abdül Kadir

Abdül Kadir was the first Ottoman pre-dreadnought battleship to be constructed. She was laid down in 1892 at the beginning of a small-scale expansion of the Ottoman Navy. Work slowed down considerably once she was framed. By the early 1900s the only progress that had been made was the addition of armor plating around her keel. Once that was finished, work ceased. Construction was planned to resume in 1904 but by that time her keel blocks, which were used to prevent hogging and sagging, had shifted and the ship was considered a total loss. She was scrapped on the slipway in 1914.

Ship	Main guns	Displacement	Propulsion	Service			
Ship	Main guns	Displacement	Propulsion	Laid down	Launched	Commissioned	Fate
Abdül Kadir	4 × 11-inch (28 cm)	8,100 metric tons (8,000 long tons)	2 shafts, 18 kn (33 km/h; 21 mph)	1892	—	—	Scrapped in 1914 before launch

== Barbaros Hayreddin and Turgut Reis ==
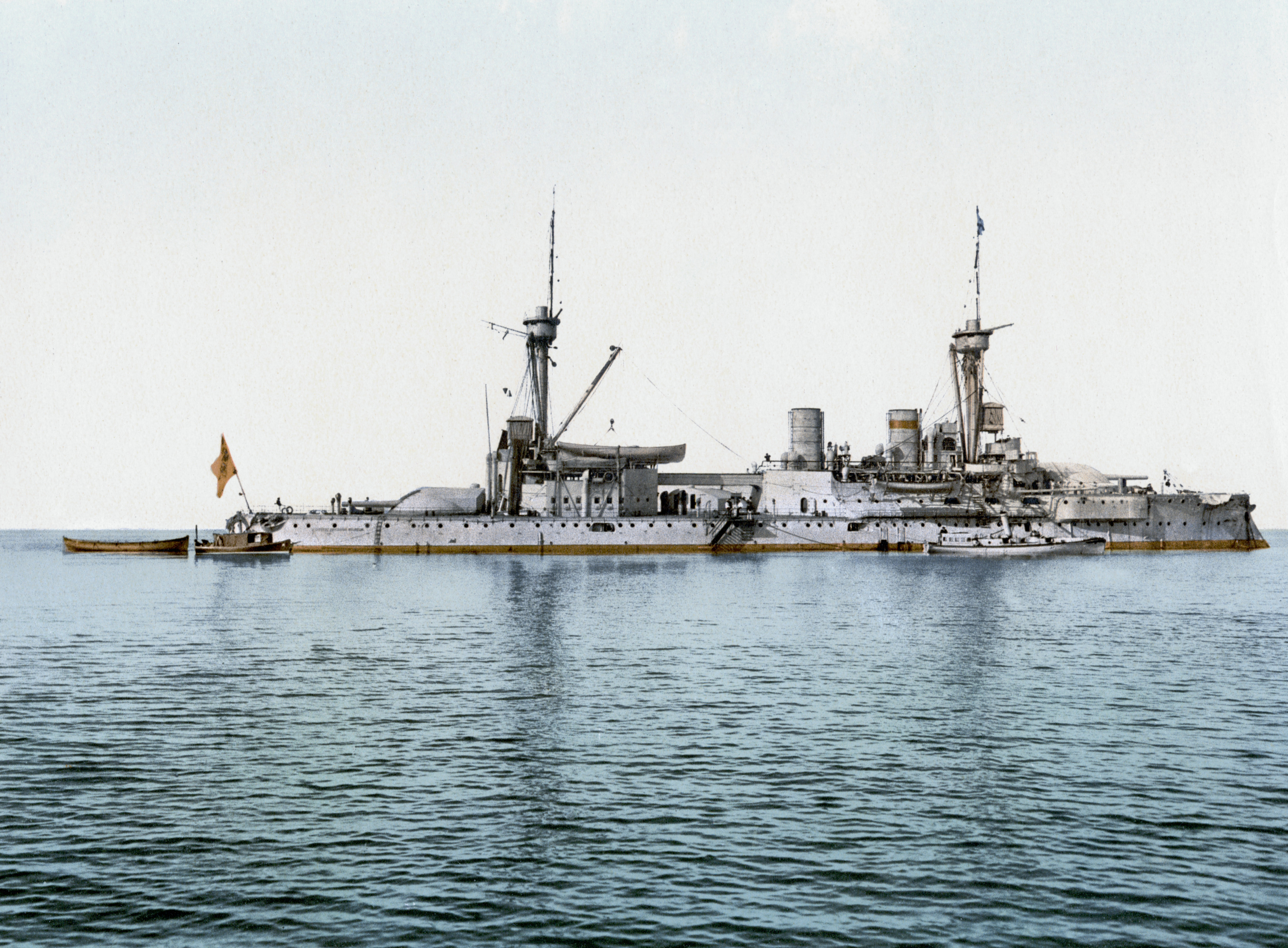
SMS Kurfürst Friedrich Wilhelm prior to being sold to the Ottoman Empire

The Ottoman battleships Barbaros Hayreddin and Turgut Reis were originally named SMS Kurfürst Friedrich Wilhelm and SMS Weissenburg, respectively. They were members of the German Brandenburg class, the first class of ocean-going battleships built for the German navy. Two other ships of the class were constructed: Brandenburg and Wörth. Of the four, Kurfürst Friedrich Wilhelm and Weissenburg were more advanced in that their armor was composed of higher-quality steel.

Kurfürst Friedrich Wilhelm and Weissenburg were sold to the Ottoman Navy in 1910 and renamed Barbaros Hayreddin and Turgut Reis, respectively. The two battleships saw very little service in the Italo-Turkish War and were mostly used to defend the Dardanelles from any Italian naval attacks. Barbaros Hayreddin and Turgut Reis saw heavy service during the Balkan Wars however, failing in two attempts to break the Greek naval blockade of the Dardanelles in December 1912 and January 1913, and providing artillery support to Ottoman ground forces in Thrace. On 8 August 1915, during World War I, Barbaros Hayreddin was torpedoed and sunk off the Dardanelles by the British submarine HMS E11, with heavy loss of life. Turgut Reis was largely inactive during World War I, in part due to her slow speed. By 1924, Turgut Reis was used as a school ship before eventually being scrapped in 1956–1957.

Ship	Main guns	Displacement	Propulsion	Service			
Ship	Main guns	Displacement	Propulsion	Laid down	Launched	Commissioned	Fate
Barbaros Hayreddin	6 × 28 centimeters (11 in)	10,670 metric tons (10,500 long tons)	2 screws, triple expansion engines, 16.5 kn (30.6 km/h; 19.0 mph)	May 1890	30 June 1891	29 April 1894	Transferred to the Ottoman Empire on 12 September 1910, sunk 8 August 1915
Turgut Reis	6 × 28 centimeters (11 in)	10,670 metric tons (10,500 long tons)	2 screws, triple expansion engines, 16.5 kn (30.6 km/h; 19.0 mph)	May 1890	14 December 1891	14 October 1894	Transferred to the Ottoman Empire on 12 September 1910, scrapped in 1956–1957

== Reşadiye class ==
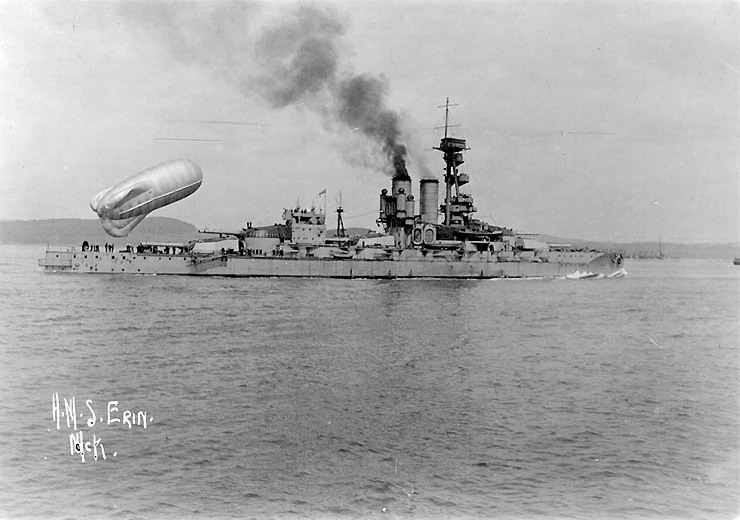
Erin in 1918 with a kite balloon

Following the purchase of SMS Kurfürst Friedrich Wilhelm and SMS Weissenburg from Germany, the Ottoman Navy drew up plans for a new class of battleships called the Reşadiye class. The class would have consisted of two ships, Reşadiye and Fatih Sultan Mehmed. Only Reşadiye was completed, though she was seized by the Royal Navy at the outbreak of World War I while under construction in Britain, due to fears that she would be used to support the Central Powers; the British renamed her HMS Erin. The seizure caused resentment among the Ottoman people as public donations had been the source of most of the funds for the ships, and her crew had already been formed. This action by the Royal Navy was a major contributing factor to the participation of the Ottoman Empire on the side of the Central Powers in World War I. The second ship, Fatih Sultan Mehmed, ordered in 1914 in response to the Greek Navy purchasing the dreadnought Vasilefs Konstantinos, was estimated to be completed in 1917. She was scrapped on the slipway in 1914.

During World War I, HMS Erin was assigned to the 1st Division of the 2nd Battle Squadron of the Grand Fleet. While serving with the 2nd Battle Squadron, she fought in the Battle of Jutland. Following the war, she became the flagship of the Nore Reserve in 1919 and was scrapped in 1922 to comply with the Washington Naval Treaty.

Ship	Main guns	Displacement	Propulsion	Service			
Ship	Main guns	Displacement	Propulsion	Laid down	Launched	Commissioned	Fate
Reşadiye	10 × 13.5 in (34 cm)	27,900 metric tons (27,500 long tons)	4 Parsons steam turbines, 21 kn (39 km/h; 24 mph)	1 August 1911	3 September 1913	August 1914	Seized by the Royal Navy in August 1914, later scrapped in 1922 in Britain
Fatih Sultan Mehmed	10 × 13.5 in (34 cm)	27,900 metric tons (27,500 long tons)	4 Parsons steam turbines, 21 kn (39 km/h; 24 mph)	—	—	—	Scrapped on the slipway in 1914

== Sultân Osmân-ı Evvel ==
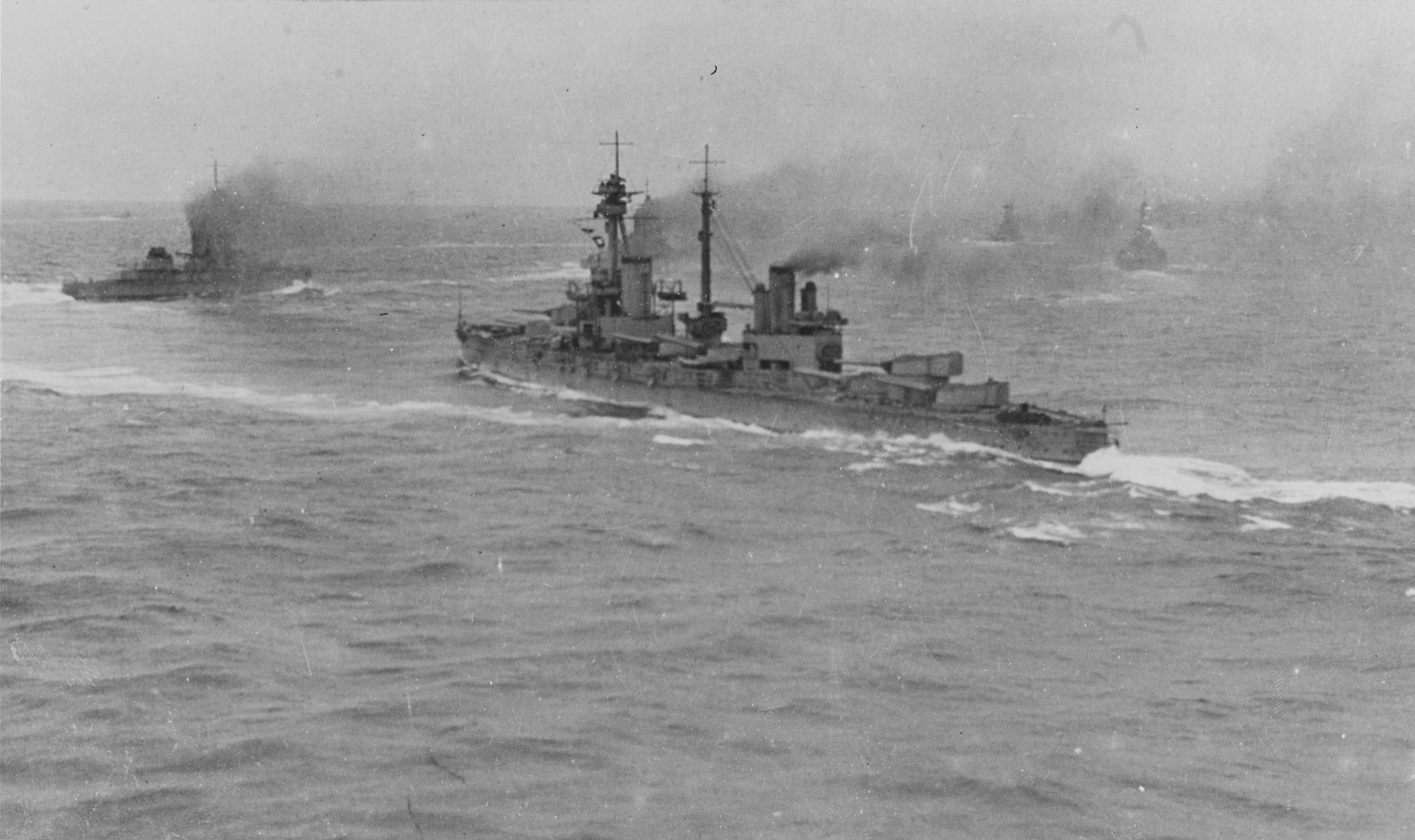
Agincourt following Erin

Sultân Osmân-ı Evvel went through three names and legally belonged to three different navies in her career. She was originally intended for the Brazilian Navy as Rio de Janeiro, and was laid down on 14 September 1911 by Armstrong Whitworth in Newcastle upon Tyne. After more than a year of construction her hull was launched on 22 January 1913. Because of an economic crisis in Brazil, the uncompleted battleship was sold to the Ottoman Navy on 28 December 1913. She was then renamed Sultân Osmân-ı Evvel. Her sea trials were completed the next August, at the outbreak of World War I. When the war began she was still in British hands. When her Ottoman crew came to collect her, the British government seized the vessel for fear of it being used against Britain in the conflict. This act outraged the Ottoman people and was a major factor in turning Turkish public opinion against Britain, which in turn helped to drive the Ottoman Empire into an alliance with the Central Powers. Once she was under British control, the battleship was once again renamed, this time as HMS Agincourt. She served in the Royal Navy for the remainder of the war and was decommissioned and scrapped in 1924.

Ship	Main guns	Displacement	Propulsion	Service			
Ship	Main guns	Displacement	Propulsion	Laid down	Launched	Commissioned (Into the Royal Navy)	Fate
Sultân Osmân-ı Evvel	14 × 12 in (30 cm)	27,500 metric tons (27,100 long tons)	4 Parsons steam turbines, 22 Babcock & Wilcox water-tube boilers 22 kn (41 km/h; 25 mph)	14 September 1911	22 January 1913	7 August 1914	Seized by the Royal Navy in August 1914 and subsequently renamed HMS Agincourt; scrapped in 1924

== Yavûz Sultân Selîm ==
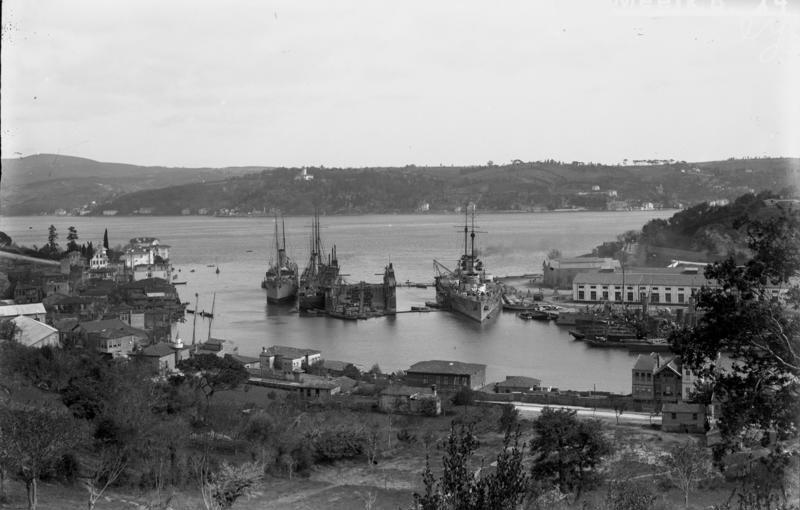
Goeben after arriving in the Bosporus

SMS Goeben was originally a German battlecruiser and a member of the Moltke class. Goeben and her sister ship Moltke were ordered in 1909 and 1908 respectively. Before being transferred to the Ottoman Navy, Goeben was assigned to the Mediterranean as the flagship of the German Navy's new Mediterranean Division. At the outbreak of World War I in 1914, Goeben and the light cruiser Breslau attempted to evade the British fleet. With the assistance of the entire Austro-Hungarian Navy the two ships managed to safely make their way to Constantinople, arriving in the Bosporus on 11 August. They were then transferred to the Ottoman Navy. Upon transfer, SMS Goeben was renamed as Yavûz Sultân Selîm. The German transfer of Goeben to the Ottoman Empire helped gain public support for the nation's entry into World War I on the side of the Central Powers following the British seizure of other Ottoman battleships. Yavûz Sultân Selîm mainly operated in the Black Sea against the Russian Black Sea Fleet stationed in Sevastopol. In 1918, Yavûz Sultân Selîm attacked British forces outside the Dardanelles; during the conflict, she struck three mines. Under attack by British bombers, she managed to beach herself and was towed back for repairs three days later. The battleship underwent a series of repairs and upgrades between 1927 and 1930. In 1936 her name was officially shortened to Yavûz. The battlecruiser continued to serve in the Turkish Navy in World War II and had her anti-aircraft battery upgraded in 1941. Yavûz was decommissioned from active service on 20 December 1950 and stricken from the Navy register on 14 November 1954. In 1973 she was sold for scrap.

Ship	Main guns	Displacement	Propulsion	Service			
Ship	Main guns	Displacement	Propulsion	Laid down	Launched	Commissioned	Fate
Yavûz Sultân Selîm	10 × 28 cm (11 in)	25,400 metric tons (25,000 long tons)	4 screws, Parsons steam turbines, 28 kn (52 km/h; 32 mph)	28 August 1909	28 March 1911	2 July 1912	Transferred to the Ottoman Navy on 16 August 1914, scrapped in 1973

== Bibliography ==
- Brice, Martin H. (1969). "S.M.S. Goeben/T.N.S. Yavuz: The Oldest Dreadnought in Existence – Her History and Technical Details". Warship International. VI (4). Toldedo, OH: Naval Records Club: 272–79.
- Burt, R. A. (1986). British Battleships of World War One. Annapolis, MD: Naval Institute Press. ISBN 0-87021-863-8.
- Erickson, Edward J. (2003). Defeat in Detail: The Ottoman Army in the Balkans, 1912–1913. Greenwood Publishing Group. ISBN 978-0-275-97888-4.
- Gardiner, Robert; Gray, Randal, eds. (1985). Conway's All the World's Fighting Ships 1906–1921. Annapolis: Naval Institute Press. ISBN 0-87021-907-3. OCLC 12119866.
- Gardiner, Robert; Chesneau, Roger; Kolesnik, Eugene M., eds. (1979). Conway's All the World's Fighting Ships 1860–1905. London: Conway Maritime Press. ISBN 0-85177-133-5.
- Gardiner, Robert, ed. (1979). Conway's All the World's Fighting Ships 1860–1905. New York: Mayflower Books. ISBN 0-8317-0302-4.
- Gröner, Erich (1990). German Warships: 1815–1945. Annapolis: Naval Institute Press. ISBN 0-87021-790-9.
- Hall, Richard C. (2000). The Balkan Wars, 1912–1913: Prelude to the First World War. Routledge. ISBN 978-0-415-22946-3.
- Halpern, Paul G. (1995). A Naval History of World War I. Annapolis: Naval Institute Press. ISBN 1-55750-352-4.
- Herwig, Holger (1980). "Luxury" Fleet: The Imperial German Navy 1888–1918. Amherst, New York: Humanity Books. ISBN 1-57392-286-2.
- Hore, Peter (2006). The Battleships. London: Southwater Publishing. ISBN 978-1-84476-299-6.
- Hough, Richard (1967). The Great Dreadnought: The Strange Story of H.M.S. Agincourt: The Mightiest Battleship of World War I. New York: Harper & Row. OCLC 914101.
- Johnston, Ian. (2000). The Battleships. London: Channel 4 Books. ISBN 978-0-7603-1018-2.
- Langensiepen, Bernd; Güleryüz, Ahmet (1995). Cooper, James (ed.). The Ottoman steam navy, 1828–1923. London: Conway Maritime Press. ISBN 978-1-55750-659-7.
- Sondhaus, Lawrence (2001). Naval Warfare, 1815–1914. Abingdon, Oxfordshire: Psychology Press. ISBN 978-0-415-21478-0.
- Staff, Gary (2006). German Battlecruisers: 1914–1918. Oxford: Osprey Books. ISBN 1-84603-009-9. OCLC 64555761.
