= Reşadiye-class battleship =

Royal Navy's Reşadiye-class of two dreadnought battleships

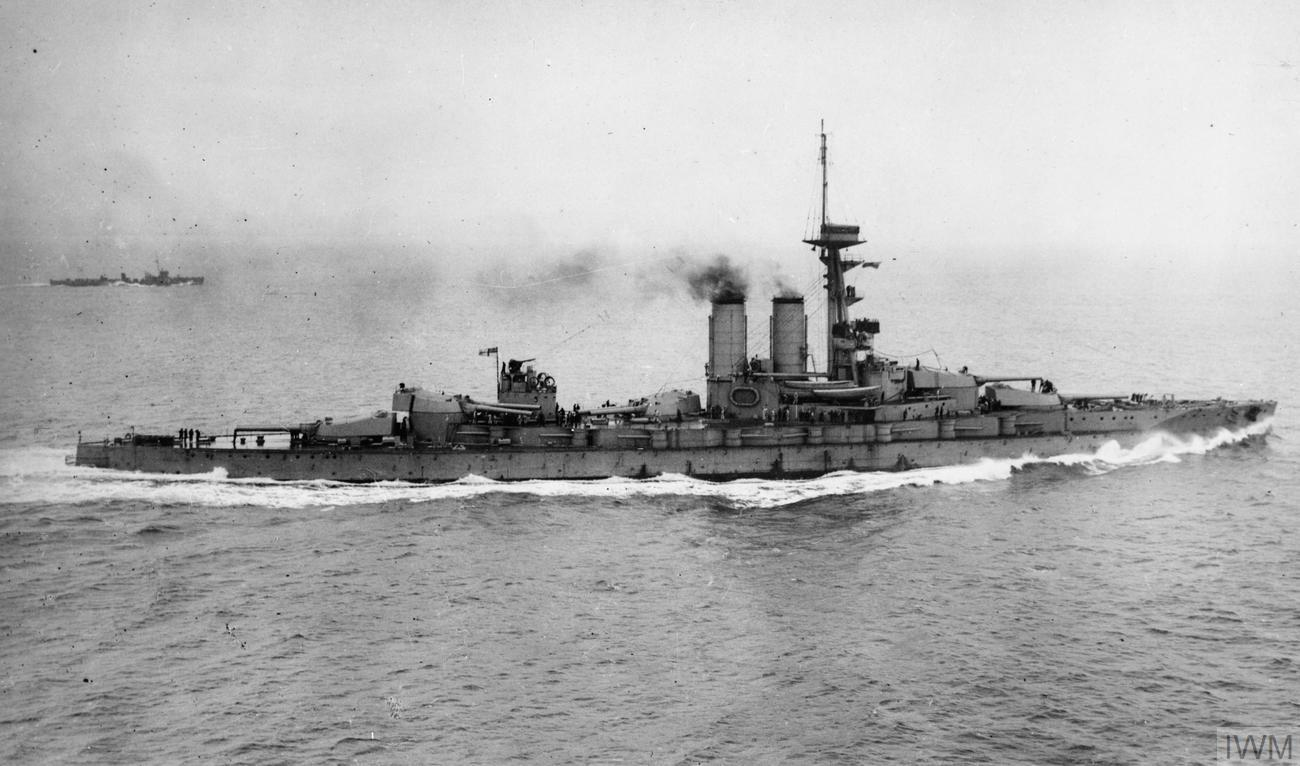
- Reşadiye after entering Royal Navy service as HMS Erin

Class overview
- Builders: Vickers, Armstrong Whitworth (planned)
- Operators: Royal Navy
- Built: 1911–1914
- Planned: 2
- Completed: 1
- Canceled: 1
- Scrapped: 2

General characteristics
- Type: Dreadnought battleship
- Displacement: 23,000 t (22,640 long tons)
- Length: 559 ft 6 in (170.54 m)
- Beam: 91 ft 7 in (27.91 m)
- Draft: 28 ft 5 in (8.66 m)
- Installed power: 15 × Babcock & Wilcox boilers; 26,500 shp (19,800 kW)
- Propulsion: 4 × Parsons steam turbines; 4 × shafts
- Speed: 21 kn (39 km/h; 24 mph)
- Complement: 1,070
- Armament: 10 × 13.5 in (343 mm) guns; 16 × 6 in (152 mm) guns; 4 × 3 in (76 mm) guns; 4 × 21 in (533 mm) torpedo tubes
- Armor: Belt: 12 in (305 mm); Turrets: 11 in (279 mm); Conning tower: 12 inches

The Reşadiye class was a group of two dreadnought battleships ordered by the Ottoman Empire from Britain in the 1910s. The design for the ships was based on the British King George V-class battleships, although it incorporated several significant improvements. They carried the same 13.5-inch (343 mm) main battery guns as the British ships, but their secondary battery consisted of 6-inch (152 mm) guns, compared to the British vessels' 4-inch (102 mm) pieces. The first ship, Reşadiye, was laid down in 1911 and completed in August 1914, shortly after the outbreak of World War I; she was seized by the British Royal Navy and commissioned as HMS Erin. The second ship, Fatih Sultan Mehmed, had only been ordered in April 1914 and little work had been done by the start of the war, so she was quickly broken up for scrap.

Erin served with the Grand Fleet for the duration of the war, and saw action at the Battle of Jutland on 31 May – 1 June 1916. She holds the dubious distinction of being the only British capital ship engaged in the battle to not fire its main battery. The vessel served briefly as the flagship of The Nore in 1919, but her career was cut short by the Washington Naval Treaty of 1922. She was scrapped under the terms of the treaty in 1922–1923.

== Background ==
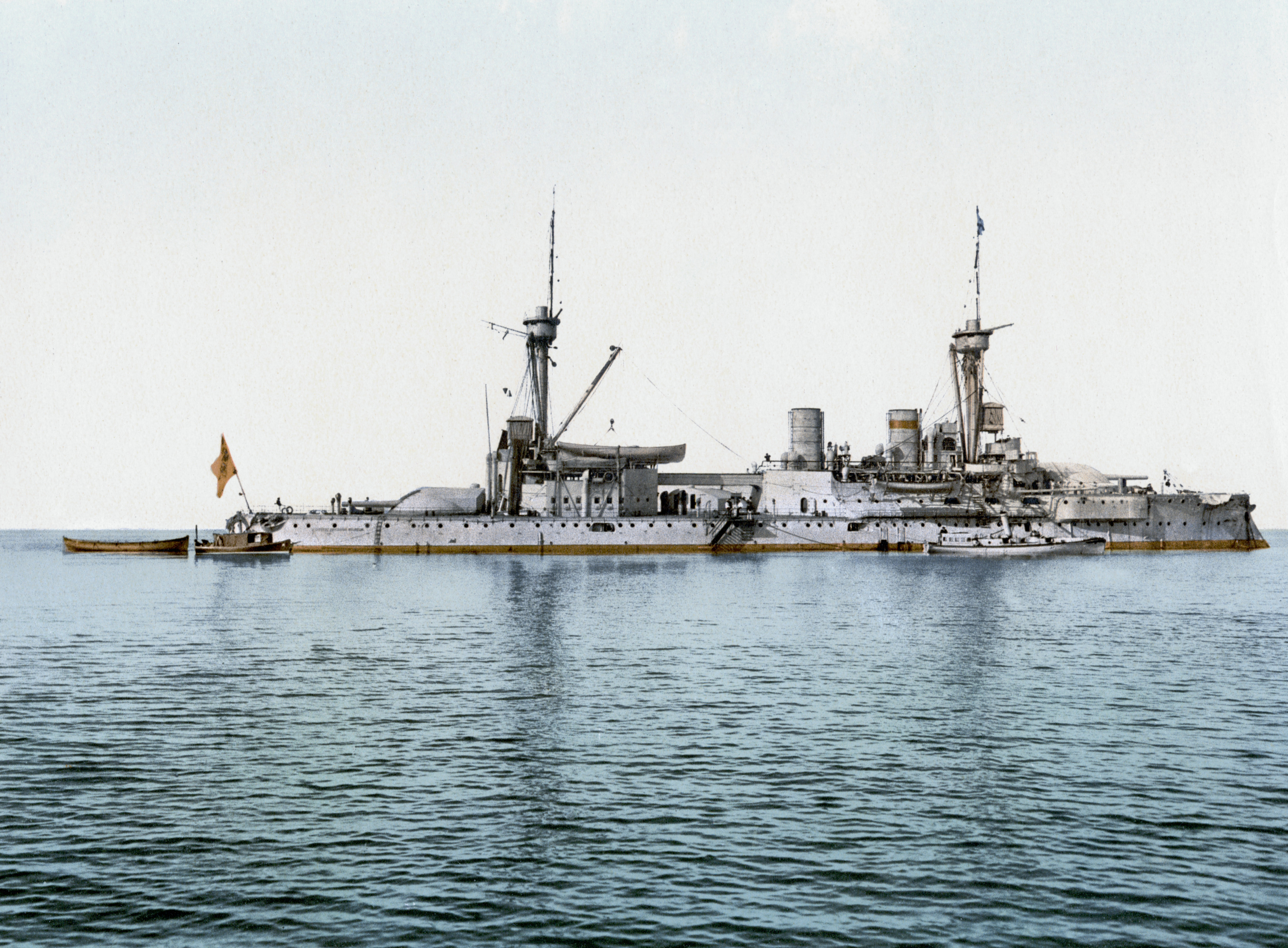
The German battleship Kurfürst Friedrich Wilhelm, purchased in 1910 and renamed Barbaros Hayreddin

The Ottoman Navy had languished since the 1870s, the result of decades of little funding for new ships, poor maintenance of existing vessels, and no serious training regimen. Efforts to modernize the fleet had occurred in fits and starts during the period, including the failed attempt to build the pre-dreadnought Abdül Kadir in the 1890s, and a major reconstruction program launched in the aftermath of the Greco-Turkish War of 1897, which had highlighted the poor condition of the fleet. Starting in 1909, the Ottoman government began to seriously look for warships to purchase from foreign shipbuilders to counter the growing strength of the Greek Navy, particularly the armored cruiser Georgios Averof. As a stopgap measure, two German Brandenburg-class battleships, Barbaros Hayreddin and Turgut Reis, were purchased in 1910.

The Ottoman government then began looking for newer vessels to buy in late 1911, and first contacted Armstrong Whitworth about the possibility of acquiring the dreadnought Rio de Janeiro, then under construction for the Brazilian Navy, along with Minas Geraes, which had been commissioned into the Brazilian fleet in 1910. These deals fell through, so the Ottomans contacted Vickers to order two new battleships. Douglas Gamble, who had previously served as a naval adviser to the Ottoman government, prepared two designs, the first of which was ordered as Mehmed Reşad V; during construction, this ship was renamed Reşadiye. A second ship, to be named Fatih Sultan Mehmed, was ordered in April 1914.

Ordering the Reşadiye class started a significant naval arms race between the Ottoman Empire and Greece. The Greek Navy ordered the battleship Salamis in 1912 in response, which prompted the Ottomans to resume their bid for Rio de Janeiro. The contract to purchase the ship, to be renamed Sultân Osmân-ı Evvel, was signed in January 1914. This in turn provoked the Greeks to order a second battleship, Vasilefs Konstantinos, which required a third Ottoman battleship to be ordered; this was the second Reşadiye-class ship, Fatih Sultan Mehmed.

== Design ==
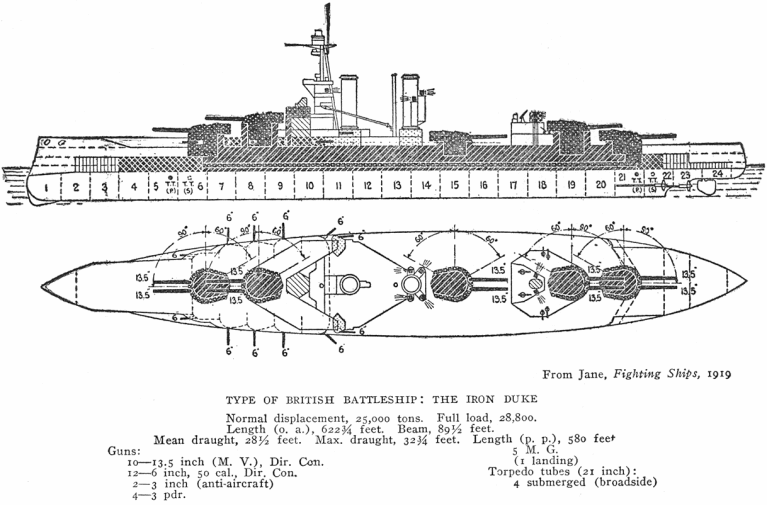
Line-drawing of the British Iron Duke class; Reşadiye was very similar to this design

The design for the Reşadiye was based on the contemporary British King George V class, with some improvements that had been incorporated into the subsequent Iron Duke class then under construction. Compared to the British ships, the Reşadiyes carried their amidships main battery turret one deck higher, which improved its ability to be fired in heavier seas. They also carried a heavier secondary battery, composed of 6 in (150 mm) guns instead of the 4 in (100 mm) weapons in the King George V class. The hull was shorter and wider than the British ships, which improved her turning radius, but the lower displacement forced compromises in armor protection and coal capacity.

=== General characteristics and machinery ===
The Reşadiye design was 525 feet (160 m) long between perpendiculars and 559 ft 6 in (170.54 m) long overall. The ships had a beam of 91 ft 7 in (27.91 m), with a designed displacement of 23,000 metric tons (23,000 long tons; 25,000 short tons). In service, Erin displaced 22,780 t (22,420 long tons; 25,110 short tons) normally and up to 25,250 t (24,850 long tons; 27,830 short tons) at full load. Erin was completed with a single tripod mast atop the conning tower, fitted with a spotting top to aid in gun-laying. She had a crew of 1,070 officers and enlisted men.

The ships were powered by four Parsons steam turbines, with steam provided by fifteen Babcock & Wilcox mixed coal and oil-fired water-tube boilers. The boilers were trunked into a pair of closely spaced funnels directly aft of the conning tower. The engines were rated at 26,500 shaft horsepower (19,800 kW) for a top speed of 21 knots (39 km/h; 24 mph). Erin carried 2,120 t (2,090 long tons; 2,340 short tons) of coal and 710 t (700 long tons; 780 short tons) of fuel oil, and she had a cruising radius of 5,100 nautical miles (9,400 km; 5,900 mi) at a speed of 10 knots (19 km/h; 12 mph).

=== Armament and armor ===
As designed, the Reşadiye class was armed with a main battery of ten 13.5-inch (340 mm) 45-caliber guns, a secondary battery of sixteen 6 in (152 mm) 50-caliber guns, and four 21 in (530 mm) torpedo tubes. The 13.5 in guns were the Mark VI type manufactured by Armstrong Whitworth, and they were mounted in five twin turrets, all on the centerline. The first two were in a superfiring pair forward, one amidships directly aft of the funnels, and the last two were in another superfiring pair, aft of the rear conning tower. The 6 in guns were mounted individually in casemates along the upper deck, eight to each beam. The torpedo tubes were submerged in the hull, two on each side of the ship. As completed, a number of smaller guns were added to Erin, including six 6-pounder 57 mm (2.2 in) guns and two 76 mm (3 in) Mk I anti-aircraft guns.

The ships were protected with an armored belt that was 12 in (305 mm) thick in the central portion, and reduced to 4 in (102 mm) on either end of the ship. The transverse bulkheads that connected the ends of the belt were 8 in (203 mm) thick. Horizontal protection consisted of an armored deck that was 3 in (76 mm) thick over the central part of the ship, where it covered the ammunition magazines and machinery spaces, and reduced to 1.5 in (38 mm) thick elsewhere. The forward conning tower had 12 in thick sides. The main battery gun turrets had 11 in (279 mm) thick faces, while the barbettes that supported them had 10 in (254 mm) thick sides, with the lower section behind the main belt reduced to 3 in.

== Ships ==
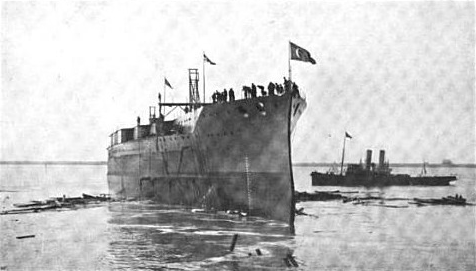
Reşadiye at her launching

The first ship of the class, Reşadiye, was ordered on 8 June 1911. Work stopped in 1912 following the start of the First Balkan War due to the probability that the Ottoman government would run out of funds. Work resumed in May 1913 following the conclusion of the conflict. The second ship, Fatih Sultan Mehmed, was ordered on 29 April 1914 in response to the Greek order for Vasilefs Konstantinos in early 1914. The British government ordered work to stop in late July 1914, as a result of the growing tensions that culminated in the outbreak of World War I on the 28th; what material that had been assembled was dismantled on the slipway in August.

There is some confusion over the number and name of ships that were part of the Reşadiye class. Some sources report Reşadiye and Mehmed Reşad V as having been different ships; these were in fact the same vessel, ordered originally under the latter name. Similarly, Fatih Sultan Mehmed is sometimes listed as Fatik or Fatih. Another ship, Reshad-i Hammiss, is sometimes reported to have been ordered in 1911 and cancelled in 1912, though according to multiple researchers with access to the Armstrong archives, the Ottomans initially only had ordered one vessel. The latter issue likely stems from the fact that the Reşadiye was ordered from an Armstrong design, with Armstrong designed armament - but the ship itself was to be built by Vickers.

Name	Builder	Laid down	Launched	Commissioned
Reşadiye	Vickers	1 August 1911	3 August 1913	19 August 1914
Fatih Sultan Mehmed	Vickers	11 June 1914	—	—

== Service history ==
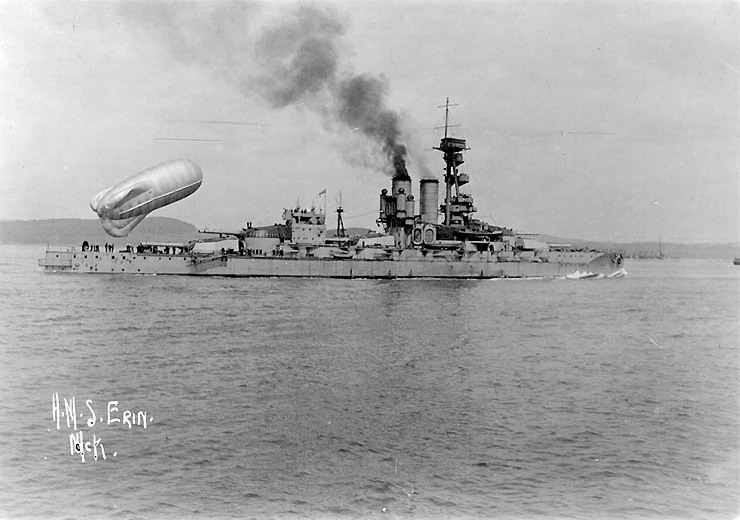
HMS Erin in 1918

By 21 July 1914, the British had postponed delivery of Reşadiye and Sultan Osman-ı Evvel as tensions flared in Europe following the assassination of Archduke Franz Ferdinand on 28 June. This action prompted a protest by Djemal Pasha, the Ottoman naval minister, via France, in the hopes of securing the ships' delivery. A transport ship carrying crews for the two battleships departed Constantinople on 4 August, only to be recalled on 7 August after the Ottoman government was informed that the dreadnoughts would not be delivered. The First Lord of the Admiralty, Winston Churchill, ordered the Royal Navy to detain the two ships on 29 July and prevent Ottoman naval personnel from boarding them; two days later, British sailors boarded the ships and formally seized them. Since Britain was not yet at war, these actions were illegal; the British government nevertheless determined to present the Ottomans with a fait accompli. On 3 August, the British ambassador to the Ottoman Empire informed the government that Britain had seized the ships.

Reşadiye and Sultan Osman-ı Evvel were then pressed into British service. Reşadiye was completed that month and commissioned as HMS Erin, with Sultan Osman-ı Evvel entering service as HMS Agincourt. In September, Erin joined the 2nd Battle Squadron of the Grand Fleet, where she served for the duration of the conflict. She took part in the Battle of Jutland on 31 May & 1 June 1916. There, she was the fourth ship in the British line of battle, along with her three surviving King George V-class half-sisters. She did not fire her main battery during the battle, the only British capital ship not to do so during the engagement; her secondary battery fired only six shells.

In 1917, fire control directors were installed, and she received flying off platforms atop her forward superfiring and amidships turrets. After the end of the war, Erin was assigned to the Nore Reserve and served as its flagship. Her postwar career was cut short by the Washington Naval Treaty, signed in February 1922, which mandated significant draw downs in naval strength for the signatories. The Royal Navy had originally intended to keep Erin as a training ship under the terms of the treaty, but a change of plans led to HMS Thunderer taking her place as the training ship, which meant that Erin had to be scrapped. The ship was sold for scrap in December 1922, and subsequently broken up by the ship breaking firm Cox and Daniels, which finished scrapping Erin in 1923.
