= BL 13.5-inch Mk VI naval gun =

BL 13.5 inch Mk VI gun
- Type: Naval gun
- Place of origin: United Kingdom

Service history
- In service: 1914–22
- Used by: United Kingdom
- Wars: World War I

Production history
- Designer: Vickers
- Designed: 1909
- Manufacturer: Vickers, Elswick Ordnance Company
- No. built: 10

Specifications
- Mass: 46 long tons (46.7 t)
- Length: 625.9 in (15.90 m)
- Barrel length: Bore 607.5 inches (15.4 m) (45 calibre)
- Shell: 1,400 lb (635 kg)
- Calibre: 13.5-inch (343 mm)
- Elevation: 0° – +20°
- Muzzle velocity: 2,445 ft/s (745 m/s)
- Maximum firing range: 23,110 yards (21,130 m) at +20°

The BL 13.5-inch Mk VI gun was a British heavy naval gun, originally ordered by the Ottoman Navy to equip its Reşadiye-class dreadnoughts around 1911. The one ship completed was seized by the British Government when World War I began in August 1914 and became HMS Erin. Only 10 guns were built, to a design similar to that of their 45-calibre BL 13.5-inch Mk V naval gun. The smaller chamber in the Mk VI gun meant that less propellant could be used which reduced muzzle velocity by 55 ft/s (17 m/s) and range by 630 yards (580 m). Designed by Vickers, they manufactured the guns of X and Y turrets, while Elswick Ordnance Company manufactured the guns of A, B, and Q turrets.

== Weapons of comparable role, performance and era ==
- 340mm/45 Modèle 1912 gun French equivalent

== Bibliography ==
- Campbell, N.J.M. (1981). "British Naval Guns 1880–1945, Number Two". In Roberts, John (ed.). Warship V. London: Conway Maritime Press. ISBN 0-85177-244-7.
- Friedman, Norman (2011). Naval Weapons of World War One. Barnsley, UK: Seaforth Publishing. ISBN 978-1-84832-100-7
- Johnson and Buxton (2013). The Battleship Builders. Barnsley, UK: Seaforth Publishing. ISBN 978-1-84832-093-2
