= Istanbul during the Ottoman Empire =

History of Istanbul under Ottoman rule

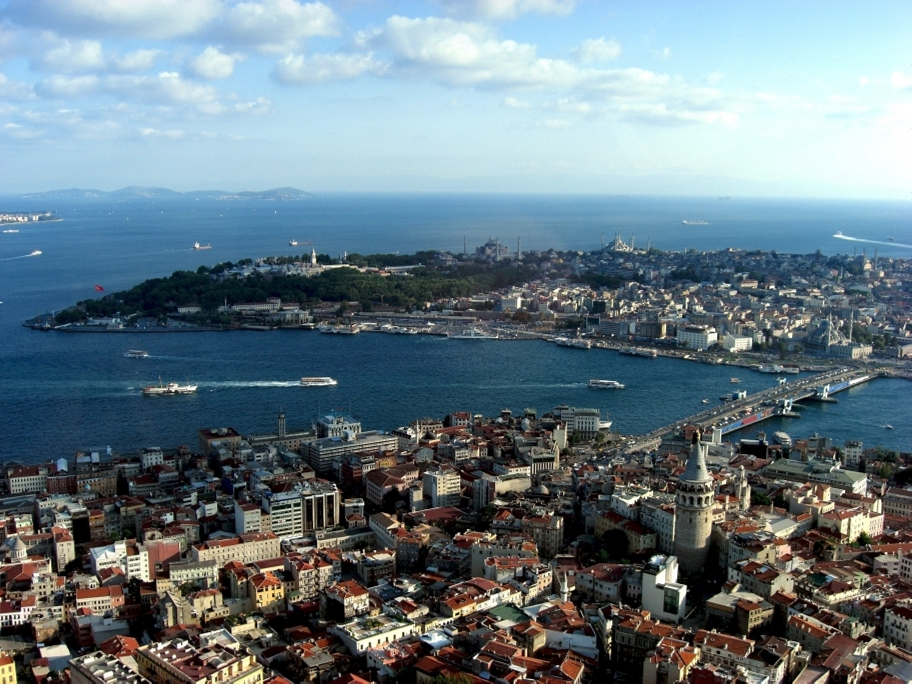
View of Istanbul from bird's-eye view (in the foreground – Galata and Golden Horn inlet, behind them – Bosphorus promontory and the Sea of Marmara)

The history of Istanbul during the Ottoman Empire covers the period from the capture of Constantinople by the Turks on 29 May 1453 to the abolition of the Ottoman Empire in 1922 and the transfer of the capital of Turkey to Ankara on 13 October 1923. For almost five centuries Istanbul was the capital of a vast state that took shape in the 14th–16th centuries as a result of the conquest campaigns of the Turkish sultans. The borders of the Ottoman Empire encompassed territories in three parts of the world – Europe, Asia and Africa. Thus, the ancient city on the shores of the Bosphorus once again became a political and economic centre of world importance. Gradually, Istanbul regained its fame as a major hub of international trade. Although the most important trade routes shifted from the Mediterranean to the Atlantic, the Turkish Straits continued to remain a bustling trade artery of the late Middle Ages.

In addition, as the residence of the caliphate, Istanbul acquired the significance of an important religious centre of the Muslim world, incorporating and reworking much from the culture of the Seljuks, Byzantines, Arabs and Persians (from Constantinople, Istanbul inherited the residence of the Ecumenical Patriarch – first among the Orthodox patriarchs of the world). The city represented a miniature model of the Ottoman Empire, with its ethnically and religiously motley population. The Ottoman capital reached its greatest flourishing during the reign of Suleiman the Magnificent, and most of the enthusiastic descriptions of Istanbul by European travellers and diplomats date to the "century of Suleiman". Since the reign of Mehmed III the gradual decline of the Ottoman Empire began, though this did not immediately affect the prosperous Istanbul. But already after Ahmed I almost no large mosques were built in the city, some monumental buildings were erected over decades, whereas riots and revolts multiplied among both the Janissaries and the capital's lower classes. The deterioration of the economic situation led to stagnation in culture and science, as well as to the ever-increasing influence of Western European powers on all spheres of life in the empire and its capital.

== Mehmed II's era ==
On 29 May 1453, Turkish forces captured Constantinople. Mehmed II, after allowing his army to plunder the conquered city, entered it through the Charisius Gate (according to other sources, the sultan entered Constantinople only three days later, after the chaos of looting and pogroms had subsided). He ceremoniously proceeded to the city centre and, as a sign of victory over the enemy, rode a white horse into Hagia Sophia, ordering its conversion into a mosque. Much of Constantinople was subjected to thorough plundering, though some areas (Studion and Petrion), monasteries, and churches remained untouched. The city itself, through the gradual transformation of the word "Constantinople" within the phonetic norms of the Turkish language, became popularly known as Istanbul, (Note: According to another version, the toponym "Istanbul" phonetically derives from the Greek phrase "eis tin polin," meaning "to the city." It is said that Greeks heading to Constantinople responded thus when asked by Turks where they were going. The Muslim conquerors gave the new name their own etymology, interpreting it as "Islambol" ("Abundance of Islam").) although the Ottomans officially continued to call it Kostantiniyye in the Arabic style for a long time. Later, thanks to the prominence of Greek dragomans, the name "Constantinople" regained widespread use in Ottoman diplomacy (in practice, both toponyms were used concurrently, but in the Christian world, the city continued to be called by its old name).

When dividing the spoils and trophies, Mehmed, per custom, received one-fifth of all that was seized. He settled his share of captives in the Fener district, thus laying the foundation for Istanbul's Greek quarter. Additionally, the inhabitants of Greek villages along the Bosphorus, who formally did not participate in the resistance, escaped captivity and deportation. Over 30,000 Greeks and Latins were sold in the slave markets of Edirne, Bursa, Gallipoli, Ankara, and Philippopolis, though many were redeemed by wealthy relatives (according to other sources, Constantinople had about 70,000 inhabitants at the time of the conquest, of whom 50,000–60,000 were sold into slavery or deported, while 10,000–20,000 remained in the city as free citizens). The bailo of the Venetian colony, Minotto, his son, and other prominent Venetians, as well as the Catalan consul and several of his compatriots, were executed. Lucas Notaras, whom Mehmed intended to appoint as the new prefect of Ottoman Constantinople, was executed for refusing to give his son to the sultan as a lover. However, other active defenders of Constantinople managed to escape, including Cardinal Isidore of Kiev, Archbishop Leonard of Chios, two of the three Bocchiardi brothers, and the Grand Logothete George Sphrantzes. Mehmed ordered the walls of Galata to be demolished and its moat filled, and all weapons were confiscated from the Genoese there. However, he guaranteed the enclave's safety, allowed it to retain its Christian character, and forbade Turks from settling there (in Galata, two Franciscan monasteries and several churches continued to hold Mass; for this reason, Turks long considered Galata separate from Istanbul, despising it as a haven of "infidels"). The nephew of Galata's podestà, Lomellino, along with the sons of surviving Byzantine nobles, were taken as hostages by the sultan (they were assigned to serve in the sultan's palace, with the most attractive sent to Mehmed's personal harem).

In early June 1453, the first Friday prayer was held in the Hagia Sophia in the presence of the sultan and his entourage. A wooden minaret was hastily added to the former cathedral, the cross on its dome was replaced with a crescent, and the mosaics and frescoes inside were whitewashed (except for the four guardian angels under the vaults). (Note: Later, under Bayezid II, a second minaret was built, and under Selim II, the remaining two were added. The interior was furnished with a mihrab, minbar, a maksura (a platform for the sultan), and other mosque attributes. Large discs bearing calligraphic inscriptions glorifying the Prophet and the first caliphs were hung on the columns at the gallery level.) Similarly, most Byzantine churches and monasteries were converted into mosques and sufi lodge. However, the superstitious Mehmed preserved many "pagan" symbols of the city, such as the equestrian statue of Justinian opposite Hagia Sophia and the columns on the Hippodrome. In contrast, he ordered the Golden Gate, through which Byzantine emperors entered the city (and through which, according to prophecy, Constantine was to return), to be bricked up. (Note: According to legend, when the Ottomans stormed Constantinople, an angel saved the last Byzantine emperor, turned him to marble, and hid him in a cave beneath the Golden Gate, where he awaits his time to reclaim the city for Christians.) Unlike the Golden Gate, the Charisius Gate, renamed the Edirne Gate by the Turks, became a symbol of Ottoman triumph and the site of annual celebrations commemorating the conquest of Constantinople. Soon, the sultan's spiritual mentor, Sheikh Akşemseddin, announced the discovery of the tomb of Abu Ayyub al-Ansari, the standard-bearer of the Prophet Muhammad, who died during the Arab siege of Constantinople in 674. Over time, on the advice of court astrologers, Mehmed ordered the removal of the giant statue of Justinian from its pedestal, which then lay on the square for a long time until the sultan's heirs melted it down in pieces in a foundry.

The Ottoman authorities sought to quickly restore the economic significance of the conquered city, resettling not only Turks but also peoples of the empire traditionally engaged in trade and crafts. The sultan ordered the repopulation of the depopulated city with Turks from Aksaray, Karaman, and Samsun, Armenians from Bursa, Tokat, Sivas, and Kayseri, Greeks from Sinop, Trabzon, Morea, and the Aegean islands, and Jews from Thessaloniki. Entire quarters in Istanbul were populated by immigrants from cities and regions of Asia Minor, named after their "small homelands" (e.g., Aksaray, Karaman, Çarşamba, and others), as well as Greek and Armenian quarters. By Mehmed's order, settlers were given homes abandoned by Byzantines and Latins, along with various incentives to encourage their engagement in crafts and trade. The development of Istanbul's economy and extensive construction in the city led to further population growth, attracting craftsmen, merchants, sailors, engineers, and officials from across the vast empire. Since non-Muslims (dhimmi) in the Ottoman Empire were barred from bureaucratic or military careers, most engaged in crafts or trade. Other priority measures taken by the sultan to restore Istanbul's vitality included appointing a vizier responsible for maintaining order in the city, gradually recruiting officials to replace the vanished Byzantine administration, restoring city walls, government buildings, private homes, and water supply systems, and concluding agreements with Italian trading cities on new rules for operating in the Ottoman capital (initially, Mehmed II reinstated most of the Genoese privileges in Galata, and later allowed Venetians and other "Franks" to settle in Istanbul).

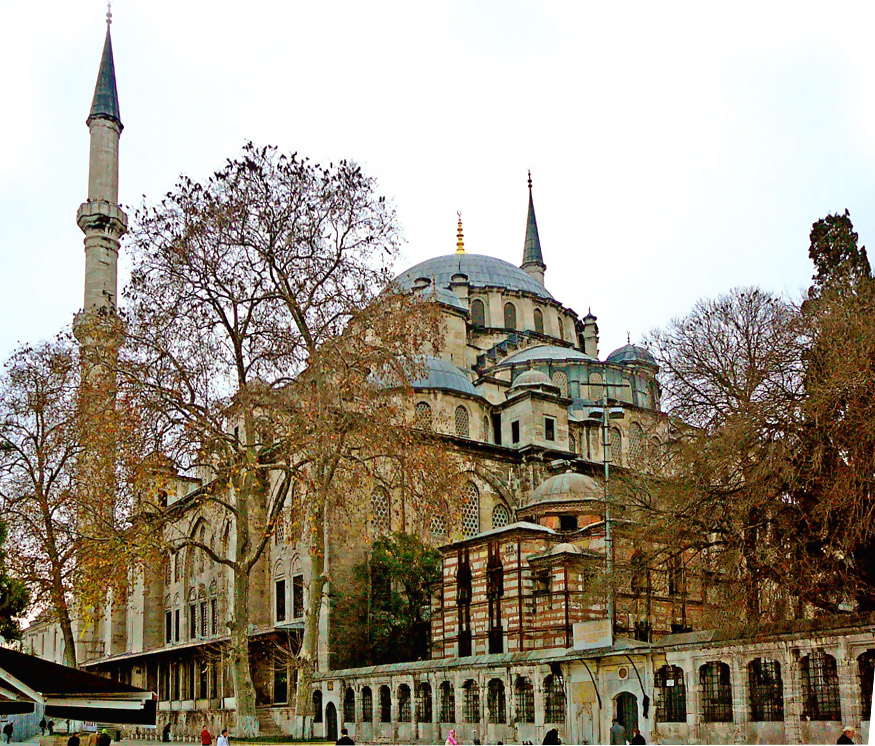
Fatih Mosque

Mehmed also ordered the Greeks to elect a new Orthodox patriarch, and the monk Gennadius Scholarios, who had escaped enslavement in Edirne and returned to Istanbul, was chosen (after the sultan's approval, the synod merely formally confirmed him). Gennadius II's consecration as patriarch took place in January 1454 in the Church of the Holy Apostles, the second-largest and most significant church in Istanbul, which became the cathedral of the Constantinople Patriarchate (a quarter of early Greek settlers even formed around it). Under the new authorities, the Constantinople patriarch was not only responsible for the conduct of Istanbul's Greeks and other Orthodox Christians but also became the head of the Christian millet of the Ottoman Empire, overseeing Orthodox believers in Asia Minor, Greece, Bulgaria, Romania, Serbia, and Albania (additionally, the patriarchs of Jerusalem, Antioch, and Alexandria were subordinate to him). Istanbul's Christians lived in their own separate quarters and were allowed to retain several churches and monasteries. They were required to wear distinctive clothing and were prohibited from possessing weapons. The Turks imposed special taxes (jizya) on all non-Muslims in the capital.

In 1456, the seat of the Constantinople patriarch was moved to the Pammakaristos Church. In the winter of 1457–1458, Mehmed finally relocated his residence from Adrianople to Istanbul (to the sultan's palace Eski Saray, built in the area of the former Forum of Theodosius). By this time, the city walls damaged during the siege had been restored, and a formidable fortress, Yedikule Fortress, was built in the southern part of the defensive system (it served not only as Istanbul's western military outpost but also as the sultan's treasury, archive storage, and political prison). (Note: The Turks rebuilt the fortress, preserving only four towers, but retained its old name — Seven Towers Castle. Seven sultans deposed from the throne were strangled here, and dozens of princes, viziers, and ministers were executed or tortured. The heads of the executed were thrown into a deep well known as the "Bloody Well." Russian envoys Pyotr Tolstoy, Alexei Obreskov, and Yakov Bulgakov were held in Yedikule.) In 1458, a mausoleum and the Eyüp Sultan Mosque — the first mosque built by the Turks after the conquest of Constantinople — were constructed on the site of the presumed tomb of Abu Ayyub al-Ansari. The area around the mosque became known as Eyüp, and its cemetery became the city's most prestigious burial ground. In 1461, the Armenian Patriarchate of Constantinople was established (the patriarch's residence was located in the Sulumonastır quarter, where a large Armenian quarter developed). In the same year, the grand Church of the Holy Apostles was demolished (along with numerous tombs of Byzantine emperors and Constantinople patriarchs buried there), and in 1470, the Fatih Mosque with its complex of buildings (several madrasas, a library, a hospital, baths, kitchens, and a caravanserai) was built in its place. In the garden of this mosque, Sultan Mehmed II, who died in May 1481, was buried. His mother, Hüma Hatun, was buried in a nearby türbe.

In November 1463, the last Trapezuntine emperor, David, was executed in Yedikule Fortress along with his sons for refusing to convert to Islam to save themselves. In 1464, the Mahmut Pasha Mosque was built, and in 1466, the Murad Pasha Mosque, which were little different from Ottoman mosques in Bursa and Iznik (however, the Turks began actively employing the expertise of Byzantine architects, even appointing them as supervisors of major construction projects). (Note: For example, one of the architects of the Fatih Mosque was the Greek Christodoulos.) The Pantokrator Monastery was converted into the Zeyrek Mosque, with some monastic premises allocated for a madrasa (in 1471, its students transferred to the madrasa at the Fatih Mosque, and the monastery fell into disrepair). In 1466, construction began on the grand palace complex of Topkapı Palace (Topkapı Saray or New Seraglio) on the site of the ancient acropolis of Byzantium. After the construction of the first buildings, including the still-standing Çinili Köşk (1472) or "Tiled Pavilion," the sultan's residence was moved from Eski Saray to Topkapı, which remained the seat of Ottoman monarchs until the 19th century. Eski Saray (then called the Old Seraglio) served for the next two centuries as a residence for the sultan's widows and concubines.

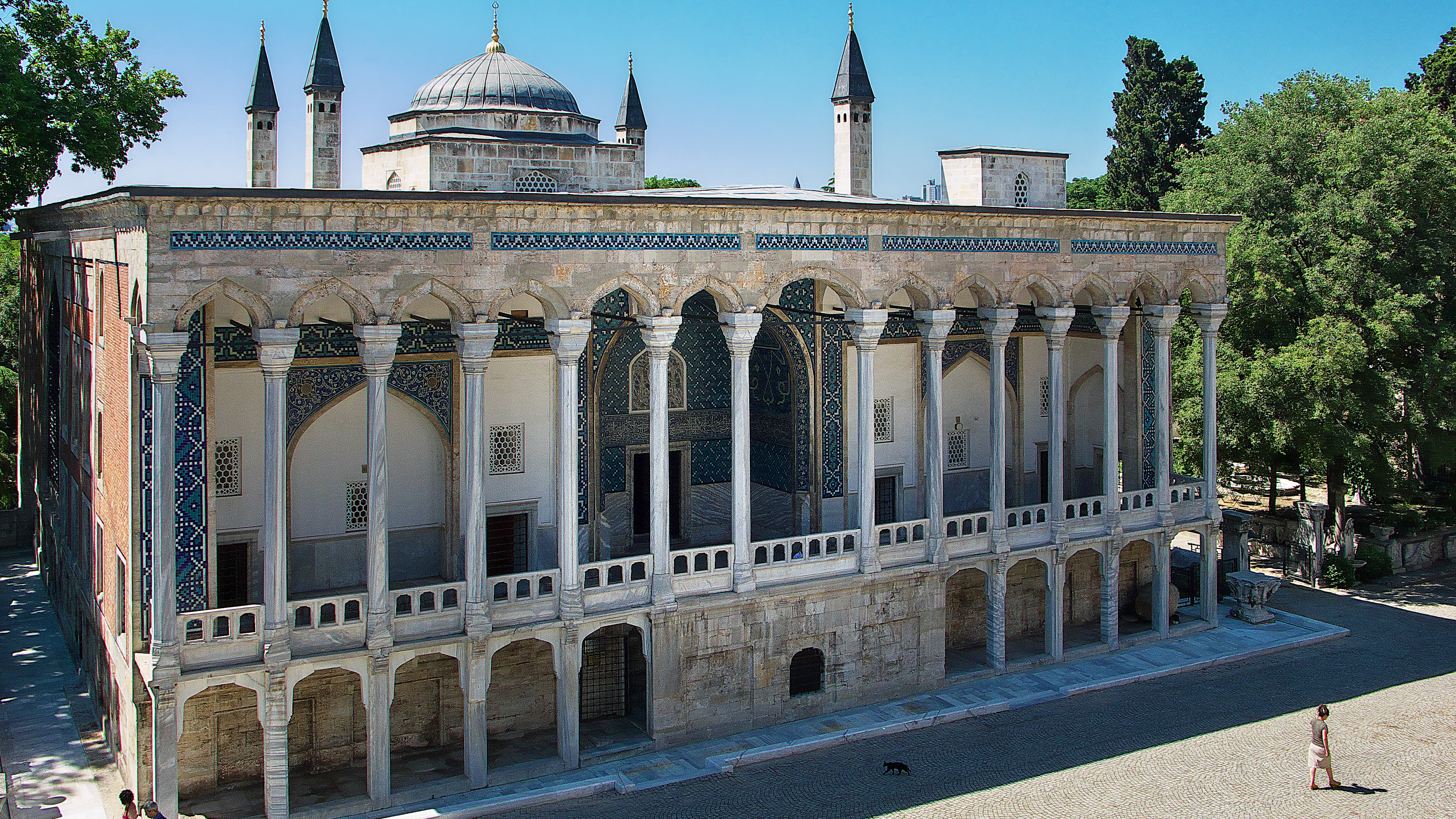
Çinili Köşk

The former Hagia Irene, located within the grounds of Topkapı Palace, was converted into an arsenal. It housed numerous Byzantine and Ottoman relics, including Mehmed II's sabre, captured cannons, the chain that blocked the entrance to the Golden Horn, and porphyry sarcophagi of Byzantine emperors transferred from the crypt of the demolished Church of the Holy Apostles.

In 1475, the Turks annexed the Genoese possessions in Crimea, resettling some of the local Genoese and Armenians to Istanbul (they were even allocated the small Church of Saint Nicholas). The captured Crimean khan Mengli I Giray, who fought on the Genoese side, was also brought to Istanbul (in 1478, the sultan freed him and restored him to the khan's throne). In the same year, the Ottomans converted the Catholic Church of Saint Paul, built in Galata in the 13th century, into a mosque. In 1478, Mehmed II, aiming to prevent power struggles, effectively legalised fratricide within the Ottoman dynasty (the law stated: "Whichever of my sons ascends the throne is entitled to kill his brothers to ensure order on earth"). (Note: Throughout the 16th and 17th centuries, about 60 Ottoman princes were killed by order of sultans, some even in infancy.)

An integral part of the Ottoman capital's character was its numerous markets, most of which were covered and specialised (the city had meat, fish, fruit and vegetable markets, bazaars, and trading rows for spices, fabrics, and furs). Typically, markets were labyrinths of narrow streets and alleys with vaulted roofs, uniting hundreds of shops and artisan workshops. Often, markets were designed by renowned architects and adorned with beautiful gates, galleries, and fountains. During Mehmed's reign, two vaulted bedestens were built on the site of the ancient Forum of Constantine, laying the foundation for the famous Grand Bazaar (today known as the Antiquarian and Sandalwood Bedestens). The Grand Bazaar was later repeatedly rebuilt and expanded, reaching the Forum of Theodosius.

During Mehmed II's reign, the foundations of Istanbul's educational system were established, funded by charitable foundations and donations from wealthy Muslims. At the lowest level were primary "schools for youths" (mekteb-i sıbyan), located in every quarter, often near a mosque. There, adolescents memorised Quranic verses, studied Arabic script, reading, and basic arithmetic. A slightly higher level of education was provided in primary schools at madrasas and Dervish lodges. In practice, primary education in Istanbul was accessible to all children. The next level was the madrasas, typically built at large Friday mosques (e.g., at the Fatih Mosque). Students living at madrasas were exempt from fees, but visiting students had to pay for tuition and meals. Graduates of prestigious madrasas could aspire to titles such as ulema, judges, mudarrises, or positions at the sultan's court, while graduates of ordinary madrasas could become regular imams or khatibs. Non-Muslims also had their own primary education system, after which those who wished could continue their studies in a seminary or yeshiva. During Mehmed II's reign, Istanbul saw the establishment of 190 mosques (including 17 converted from Christian churches), 24 mektebs and madrasas, 32 hammams, and 12 markets.

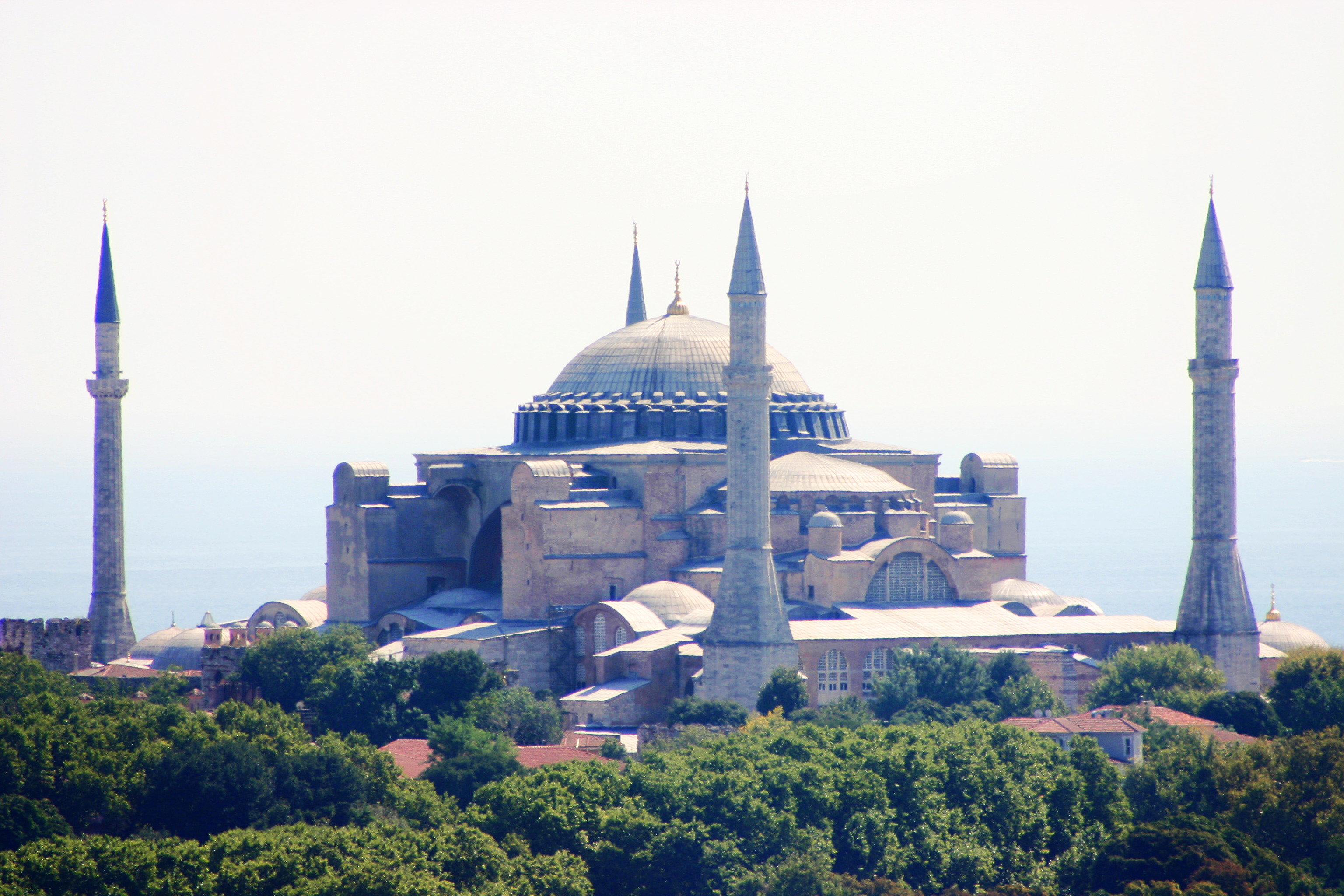
Hagia Sophia

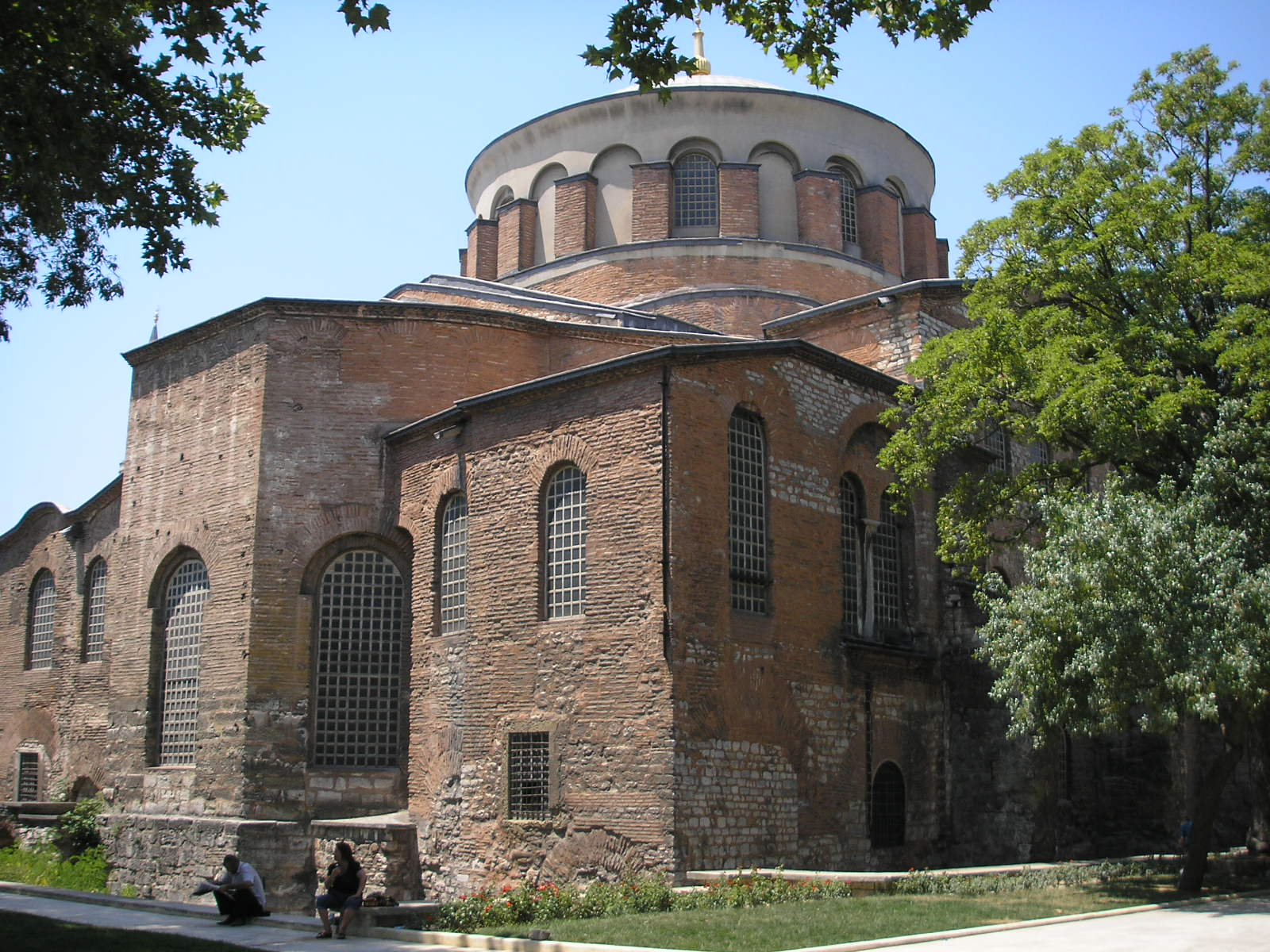
Hagia Irene

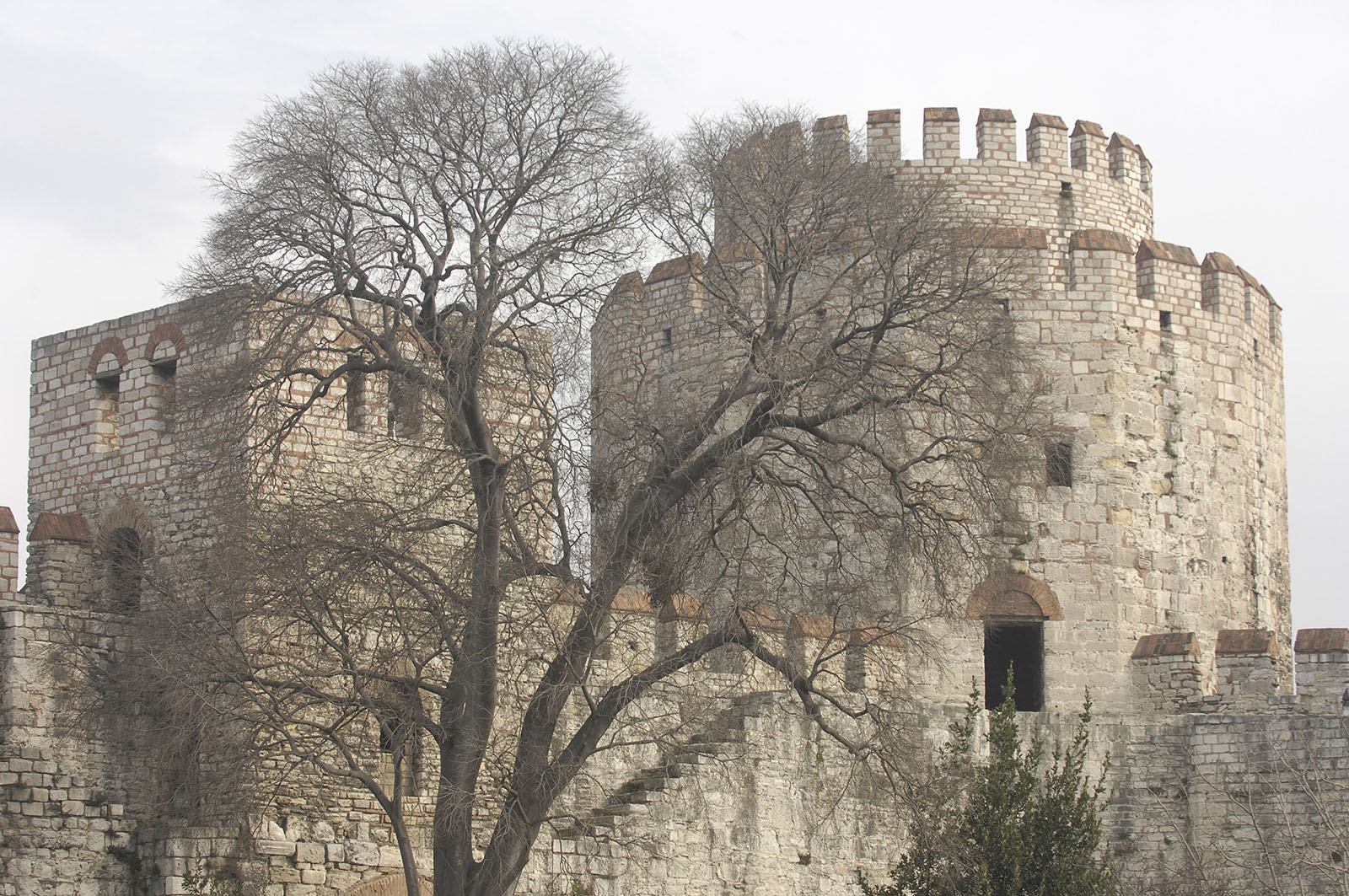
Yedikule Fortress

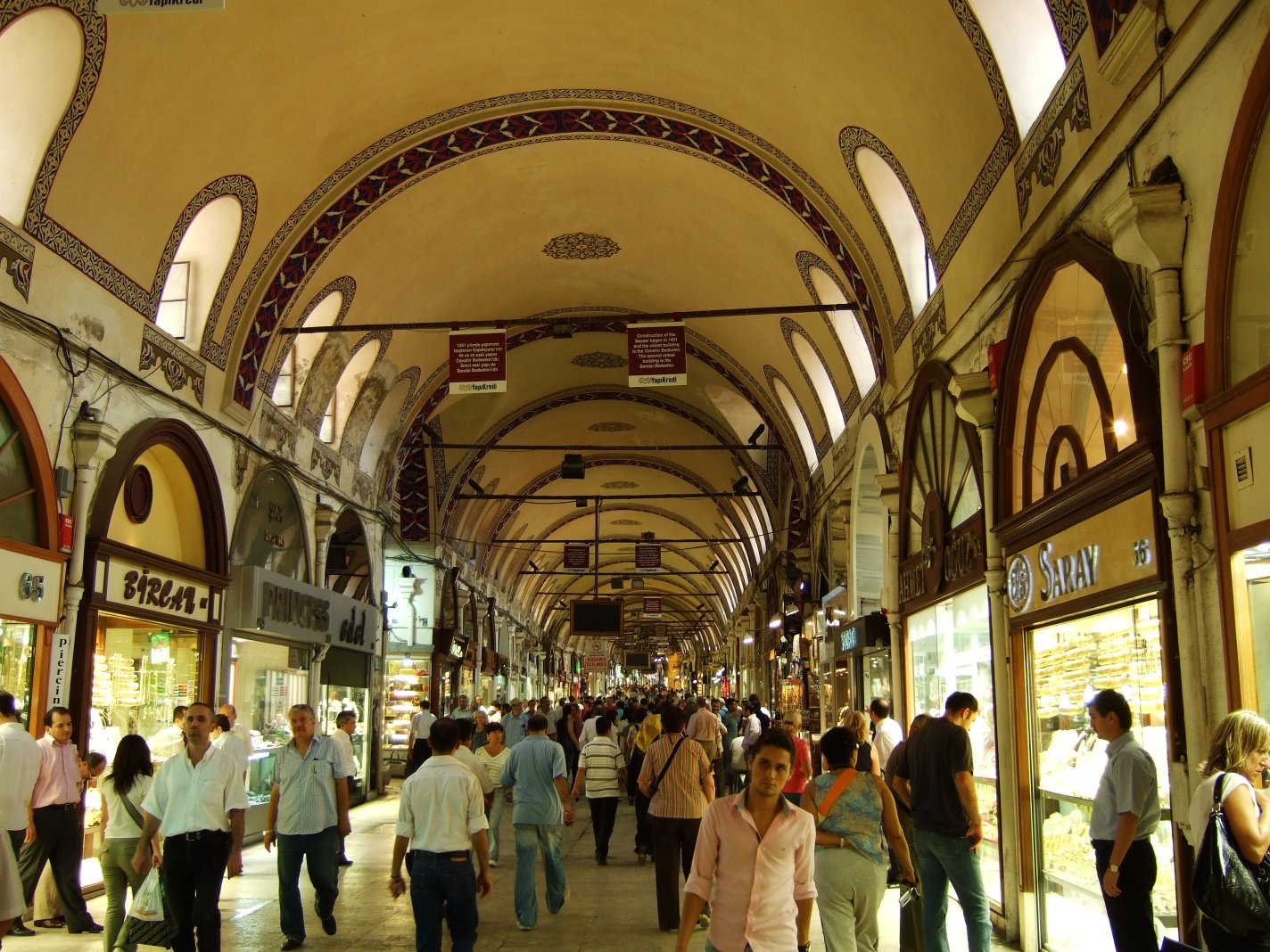
Grand Bazaar

In the late 1470s, Istanbul and Galata had about 80,000 residents (a contemporary manuscript reports nearly 9,500 Muslim households and over 6,300 non-Muslim households, of which about 650 belonged to Jews). The ancient Chalcedon on the Asian shore of the Sea of Marmara was renamed Kadıköy by the Turks, meaning "Judge's Village." By Mehmed II's decree, all revenues from this settlement went to the first judge (kadi) of Istanbul, Hızır Bey. In the spring of 1481, after Mehmed II's death (according to one version, he was poisoned by a Persian physician on the orders of his son, Prince Bayezid II), a struggle for the throne erupted between the sultan's sons. The elder, Bayezid, was the governor of Amasya, while the younger, Cem, was the governor of Konya. The grand vizier Karamani Mehmet Pasha, awaiting the arrival of both princes in Istanbul, was soon killed by Janissaries loyal to Bayezid. Ultimately, Bayezid arrived in the capital first, proclaimed himself the new sultan, and in the summer of 1481 defeated Cem's forces (additionally, by Bayezid's order, Cem's two sons were killed, and later, three of the sultan's own sons who rebelled against him were also executed).

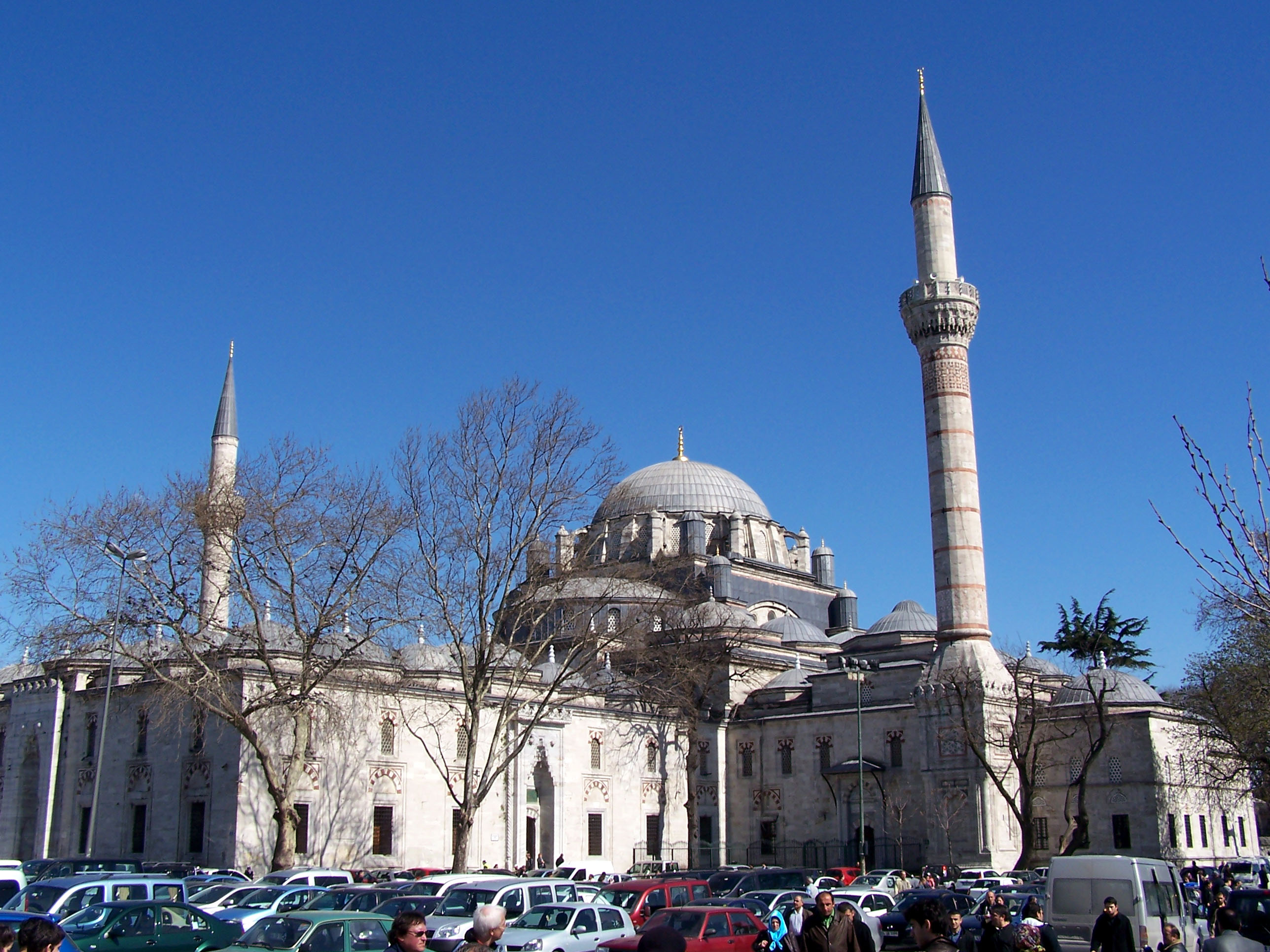
Bayezid II Mosque

== Bayezid II's era ==
At the end of the 15th century, a large wave of Jewish refugees from Spain and Portugal(Sephardim) settled in Istanbul. Bayezid II, upon learning of the expulsion of Jews from the Iberian Peninsula, reportedly exclaimed: "Ferdinand of Spain is a foolish king! He has impoverished his country and enriched ours." The educated Sephardim proved valuable to the empire, where the upper class preferred military careers and the lower classes engaged in agriculture. Alongside Armenians and Greeks, Jews formed the backbone of the trading class, engaging in crafts and medicine, with some serving at the court as advisers, diplomats, or physicians. During this period, Jews also established a printing press in the city, introducing the first printing press in the country. Additionally, some of the Moors expelled from Spain settled in Istanbul, and the sultan granted them a mosque in Galata (now known as the Arap Mosque). By Bayezid's order, a group of Vlachs was also resettled in Istanbul, forming a compact quarter near the Silivri Gate. By the end of the 15th century, the population of the Ottoman capital exceeded 200,000 people.

At the beginning of the 16th century, a fierce struggle unfolded in Istanbul between the "Romaniote" Jews and the newly arrived Sephardim for the title of Grand Rabbi, which granted control over the entire Jewish community. The more numerous and educated Sephardim emerged victorious, while the Romaniotes suffered a series of calamities, including two major fires that destroyed their quarters, synagogues, and commercial enterprises (after which the ancient community dispersed and eventually assimilated into other Jewish communities in the Ottoman capital). In addition to voluntary migrations, the devshirme system significantly influenced Istanbul's population composition, supplying up to a third of the administrative system's "slaves of the sultan" in the 16th century. From the youths brought through devshirme, most of the Ottoman grand viziers, officials, military personnel (especially Janissaries), theologians, and palace servants originated (by the 17th century, the devshirme system gradually declined and ceased to serve as a source of "fresh blood").

At the turn of the 15th and 16th centuries, a new type of mosque emerged in Ottoman architecture, inspired by the Byzantine Hagia Sophia. The architecture of this cathedral left an indelible impression on the conquerors and influenced the subsequent development of Turkish architectural art. The artist Baba Nakkaş, who arrived in Istanbul from Samarkand, founded the local school of miniature painting. In September 1509, Istanbul suffered severe damage from the powerful earthquake. Thousands of residents perished, numerous homes were destroyed, and the disaster caused significant damage to hundreds of mosques, caravanserais, baths, fortresses along the Bosphorus, and even the sultan's palace. In April 1512, under pressure from the Janissaries, Bayezid II abdicated in favour of his son Selim I, and a month later, he was poisoned by his son's order. Bayezid was buried in a türbe at the mosque bearing his name, constructed by his order in 1506 near the Grand Bazaar (the architects Yakub Shah or Kemalettin used Hagia Sophia as a model, adopting its general outline, dimensions, and dome shape). Additionally, during Bayezid's reign, the Chora Church was converted into the Kariye Mosque ("Mosque of Victory"), the Church of Saint John Studion into the İmrahor Mosque, the Church of Saints Sergius and Bacchus into the Küçük Ayasofya Mosque ("Little Hagia Sophia"), and the Church of Saint Andrew into the Hoca Mustafa Pasha Mosque.

== Selim I's era ==
Upon returning from the Crimean Khanate to Istanbul and ascending the throne, Selim I ordered the execution of all his father's male relatives who could potentially claim his position in the future (two brothers, four nephews, and later three of his rebellious sons). In 1514, Selim defeated the Iranian army of Ismail I and captured the Safavid capital Tabriz, bringing to Istanbul as trophies a golden shah's throne adorned with rubies, emeralds, and pearls, the shah's harem, and numerous skilled artisans (especially potters). In 1516–1517, Selim I conquered the Hejaz, Syria, Palestine, and Egypt, assuming the title and rights of caliph — the spiritual leader of Muslims (he captured the heir of the Abbasid caliphs and imam of the global Islamic community, al-Mutawakkil, imprisoned him in the Yedikule Fortress, after which he publicly renounced his title in favor of Selim). As a result, the former capital of Eastern Christianity became the main bastion of Islam, but, unlike Cairo and Baghdad, Istanbul never became a center of Muslim theology. During Selim I's reign, many Wallachians, as well as Arab, Jewish, and Persian artisans, relocated to Istanbul. The Persian historian Idris Bidlisi, the poet Revani, and the writer Saadi worked here. On the shores of the Golden Horn, by the sultan's order, large faience workshops were established, renowned for their magnificent products (including tiles).

Officially, on behalf of the sultan, the empire was governed by two high-ranking officials — the grand vizier (vezir-i azam or vizir-i azem, later sadr-i azem) and the shaykh al-Islam (also the mufti of Istanbul), who were entrusted with the full scope of secular and religious authority of the state. However, real power often lay in the hands of the sultan's close associates — his mother, who effectively managed the harem, favored concubines (especially those who bore sons and were potential mothers of future sultans), the chief eunuchs (kizlar agasi and kapi aga), or the commander of the Janissaries (usually the Janissary aga ranked higher in the military hierarchy than other commanders — the kapudan pasha, sipahi aga, and topchubashi, the commander of artillery). The sultan's harem had a clear hierarchical structure: following the valide sultan and haseki sultan were the ikbal (temporary concubines), odalisques (other harem residents), and jariye (female slaves). Over time, a vast military-administrative apparatus of the empire was concentrated in the capital — the grand vizier, assisted by the kubbe viziers ("viziers of the dome," whose number varied from one to ten in different eras), their subordinate departments (financial, foreign affairs, provincial administration, army and navy command), numerous sharia judges (qadis), and supervisory officials, supported by secretaries (emins) and scribes (katibs), elite military units, and foreign embassies.

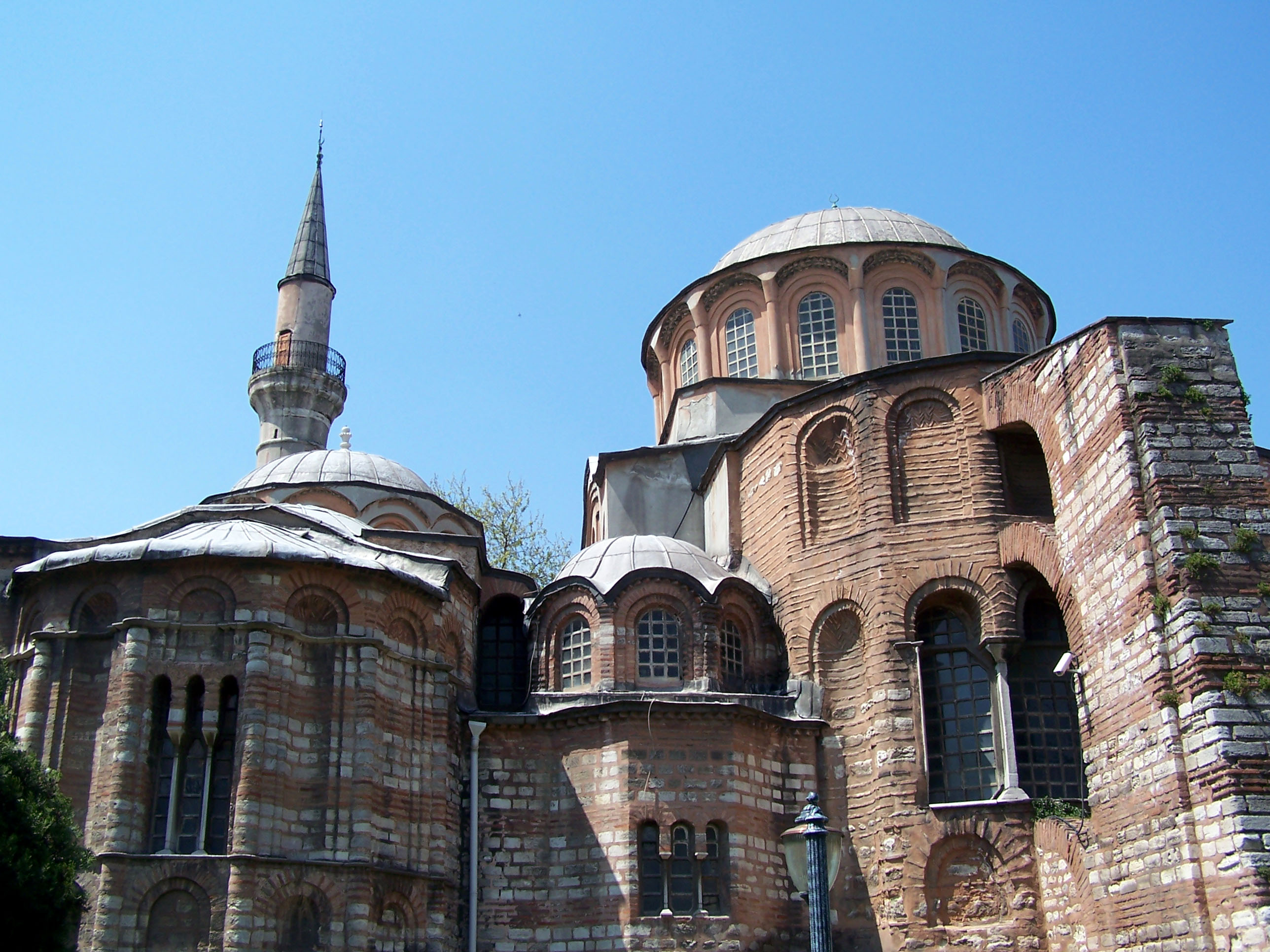
Kariye Mosque

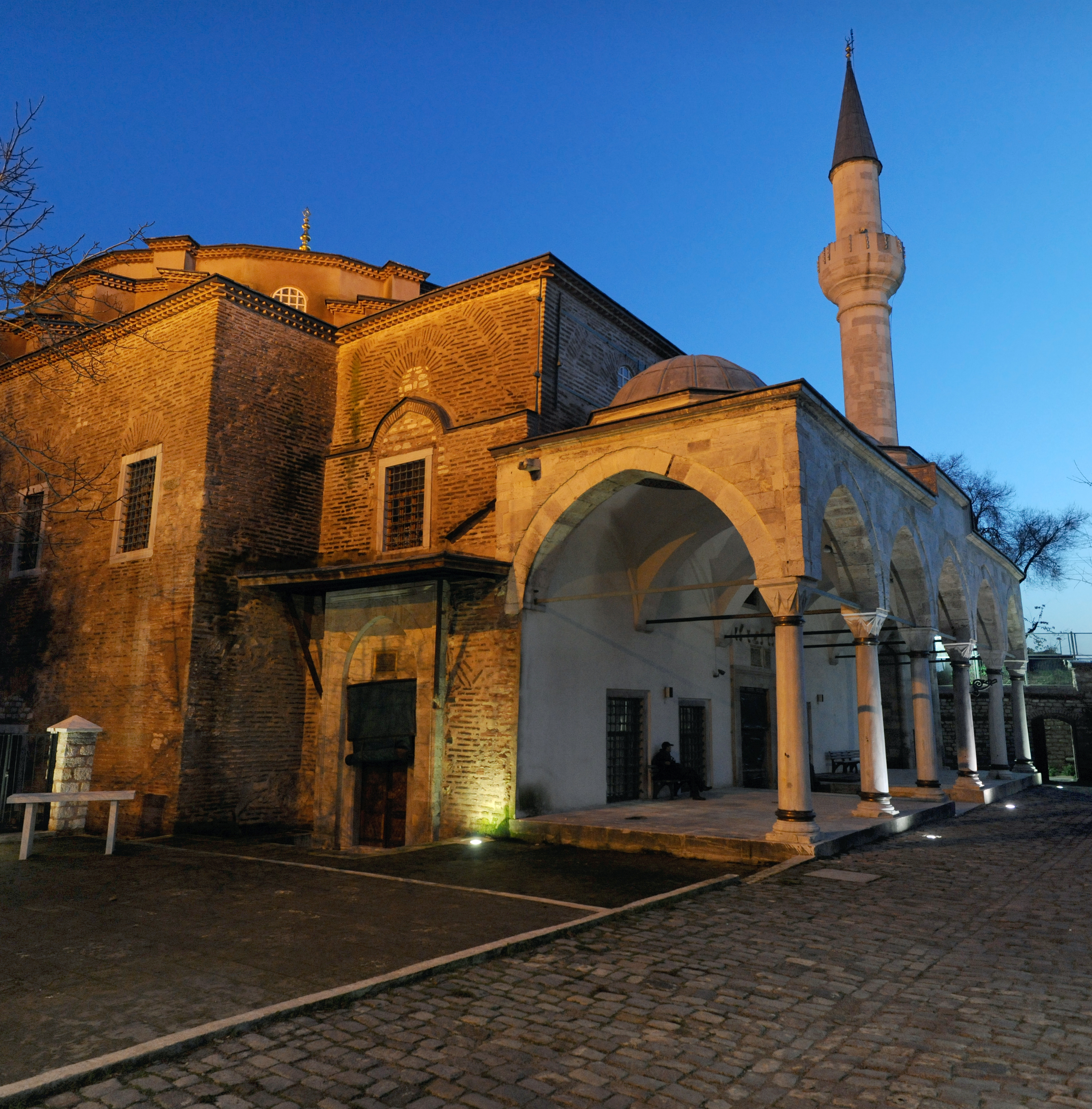
Küçük Aya Sofya Mosque

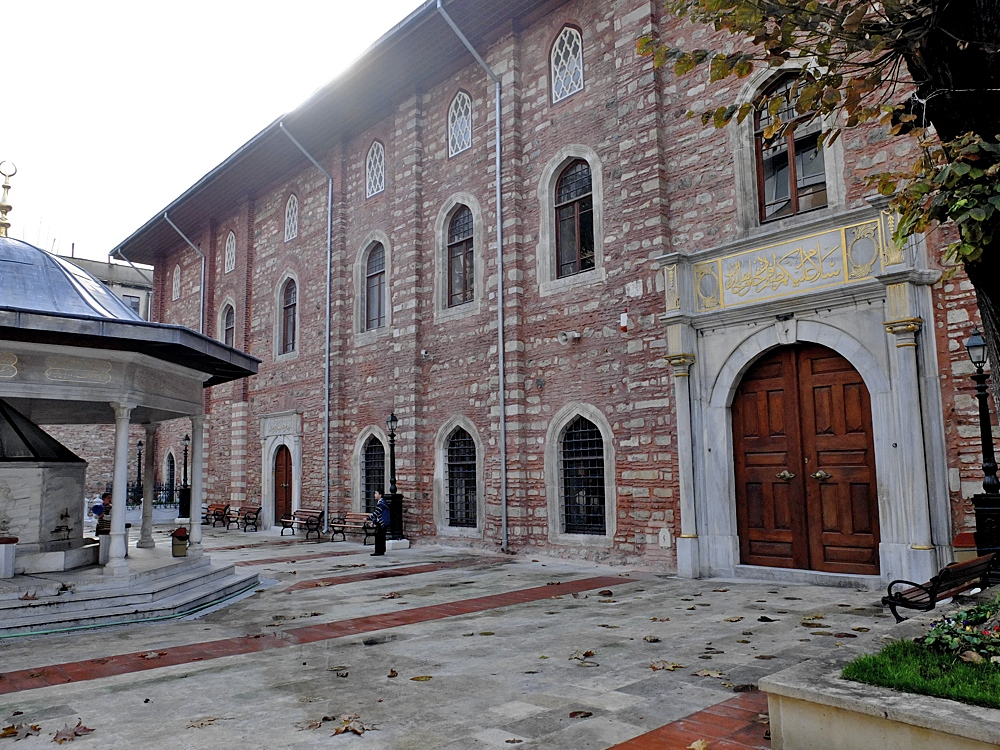
Arab Mosque

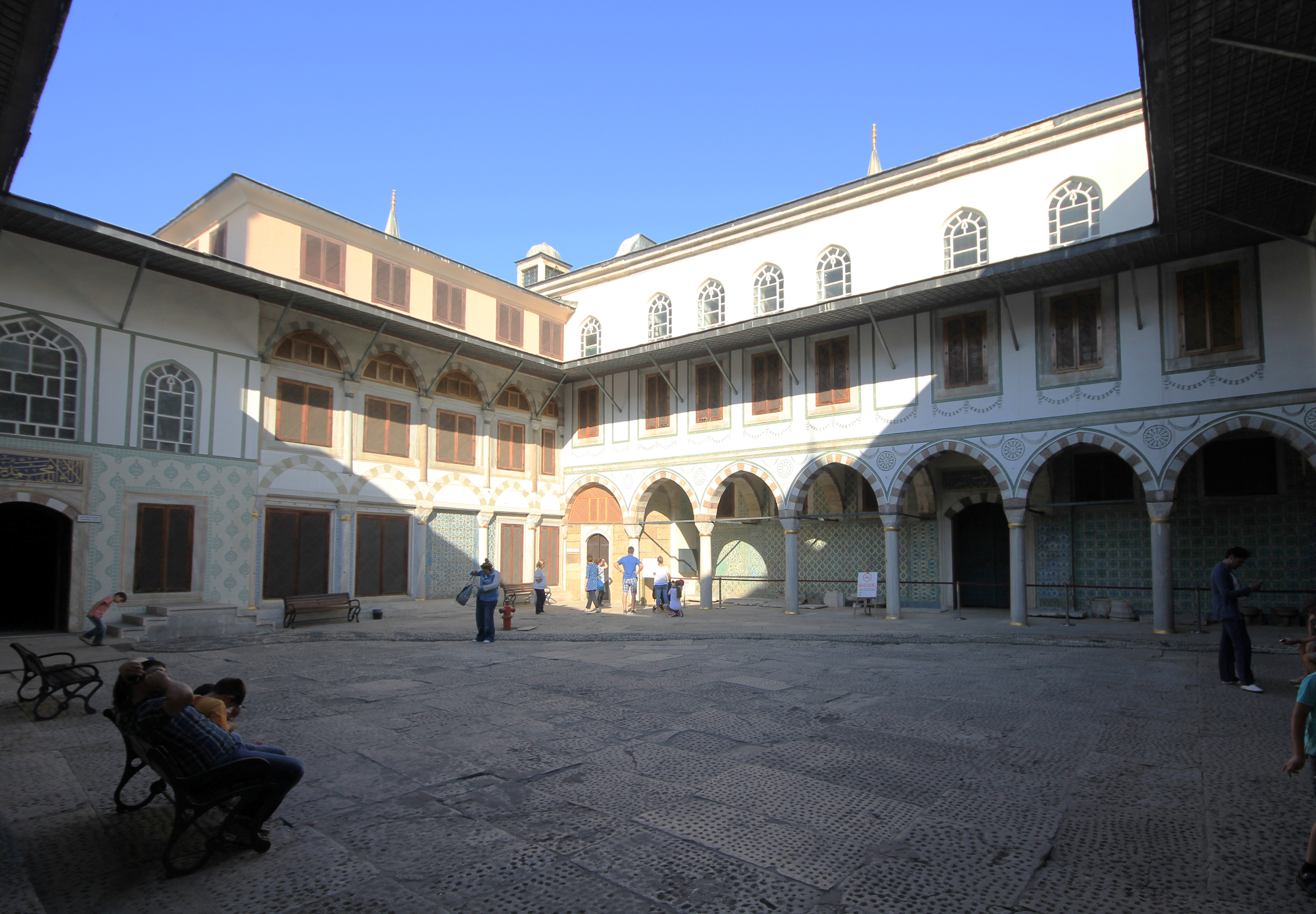
Sultan's harem

Several thousand people were concentrated directly in the sultan's palace. At the bottom of the hierarchical ladder were the acemi oğlan (trainees of the palace school) and iç oğlan (sultan's pages). Next were the rikab agalari — "agas of the sultan's stirrup" (the sultan's close associates), which included the mirahor-i evvel — "chief equerry" (head of the sultan's grooms, horse trainers, saddlers, and camel drivers), bostancibashi — "head gardener" (chief of the palace's internal guard and summer residences on the Bosphorus), miralem — "chief standard-bearer" (head of the guard and musicians accompanying the sultan during outings), and kapicilar kahyas — "chief gatekeeper" (head of palace servants and the entire household), who oversaw the kapicibashi (chief gatekeepers, who also carried out important and secret missions) and hazinedarbashi (head of the sultan's personal treasury). The "agas of the stirrup" managed a large staff — those responsible for various household and auxiliary services within the palace structure (kitchens, baths, warehouses, arsenal, mint, archive, library, etc.), treasurers, scribes, suppliers (of food, wine, horse feed), huntsmen, palace guards, the sultan's and princes' personal bodyguards, and their trusted physicians. At the top of the pyramid was the corps of ulema — court scholars and theologians.

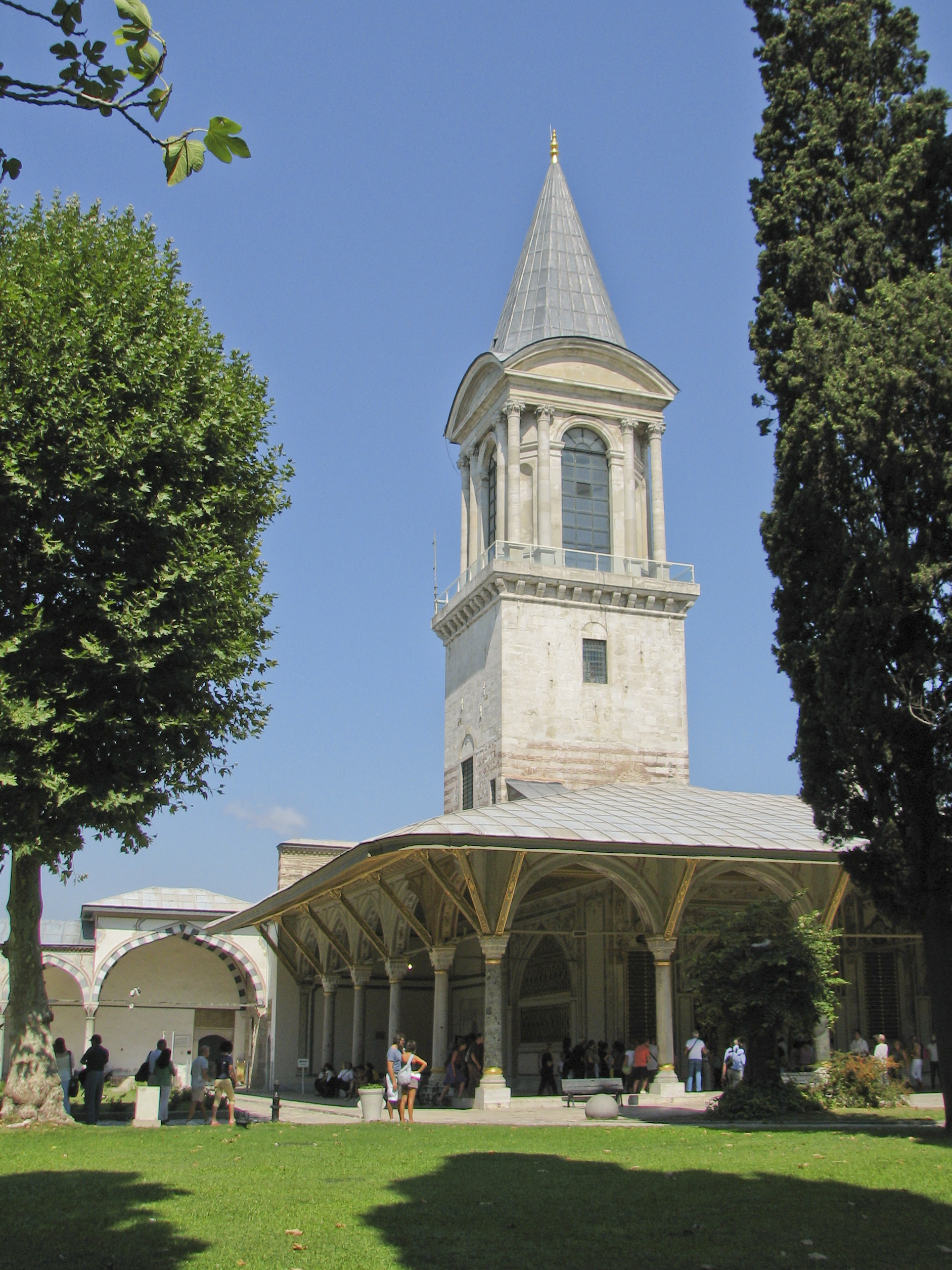
Kubbealtı

Meetings of the divan were held in the Kubbealtı ("Six-Domed") building within the Topkapi Palace. These meetings were attended by the grand vizier, the nişancı (head of the government chancery and record-keeping), the başdefterdar (chief treasurer of the empire), the kapudan pasha, and the beylerbeys of Anatolia and Rumelia (sometimes the sultan attended, observing from a small lodge separated by a lattice, allowing him to see and hear everything while remaining unseen). Initially, the divan met every day after the morning prayer and deliberated until noon, but from the mid-16th century, meetings were typically held on Saturdays, Sundays, Mondays, and Tuesdays. Upon taking office, a new grand vizier received the sultan's seal with his tughra, which he always carried on his chest, as well as his own court with over 2,000 officials and servants. (Note: Initially, the grand vizier's residence was his own house; later, viziers moved to one of the palaces near Topkapi or to quarters within Topkapi temporarily provided by one of the court dignitaries.) The maintenance of the vizier's chancery and court was funded from his personal resources but later reimbursed from the treasury, as well as through gifts from appointees (caize), petitioners, and revenues from Cyprus, which went to the vizier's personal treasury. However, upon the death or dismissal of a grand vizier, all his property reverted to the imperial treasury.

The sultan's government placed great importance on managing the capital. Usually, on Wednesdays, divan meetings chaired by the grand vizier were dedicated specifically to addressing Istanbul's issues (effectively, the grand vizier led both the imperial and capital administrations). After these meetings, a grand vizier's lavish escort, which included subaşı and asesbaşı (police officers), çavuş (government and palace gatekeepers), the qadis of Istanbul, Eyüp, Galata, and Üsküdar, their deputies and secretaries, the Janissary aga, guild leaders, and city administration officials, inspected market and slaughterhouse prices and visited guild offices in the Ünkapanı quarter. Often, the administration of Istanbul was entrusted to a kaymakam, appointed by the grand vizier as his deputy (he also handled all capital affairs in the grand vizier's absence during military campaigns or when accompanying the sultan on trips). All judicial matters were under the jurisdiction of qadis, with the qadi of Istanbul being the chief among them. Additionally, qadis oversaw muhtasibs — officials who inspected markets, trade, and craft guilds — and naibs, who managed smaller neighborhoods (nahiye) in the Eyüp, Galata, and Üsküdar districts. Military judges reported to the chief kadiasker and maintained order in the army and navy (additionally, kadiaskers appointed all subordinate judges in their territories, except for the qadi of the capital, who reported to the shaykh al-Islam).

The shaykh al-Islam and his chancery reviewed all decrees of the sultan and vizier for compliance with sharia law. Qadis and their deputies resolved all disputes and conflicts in the city, performed marriages, freed slaves, communicated new laws and decrees to guilds and residents, ensured their enforcement, collected and forwarded complaints from artisans and merchants to the government, and controlled the collection and amount of taxes. The prefect of Istanbul (şehremini) handled city improvement issues, was responsible for all construction and building repairs, and ensured the capital's water supply. He oversaw the chief architect (mimarbaşı), without whose permission no construction was allowed in Istanbul, the financial intendant (bina emini), who collected construction taxes, the water supply inspector (sunaizi), responsible for cisterns, aqueducts, and fountains, and the city property inspector (tahir subaşı or çöplük subaşı). Subordinates of the mimarbaşı monitored building conditions, fined owners for poorly maintained properties, and managed the demolition of dilapidated structures. A separate service under the çöplük subaşı was responsible for street cleanliness, though its work frequently received justified criticism. The guild of arayidjiyan ("searchers") cleared streets, markets, and courtyards of manure, household waste, food scraps, and dirt, salvaging anything useful and dumping the rest into the water.

Divan meetings and ambassador receptions
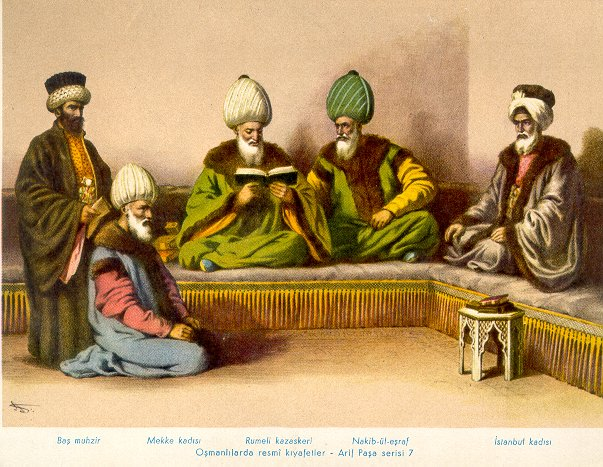

Also under the kaymakam's authority there was an intendant responsible for food supplies to Istanbul (arpa emini). Originally responsible for supplying oats to the sultan's stables, his duties later expanded to procuring and delivering all grain to the capital. Qadis, muhtasibs, and the "market police" (ihtisab) strictly ensured that goods were sold at fixed prices, merchants did not shortchange customers, raw materials were fairly distributed among guilds, all taxes and fees were paid, and no contraband entered the city. Over time, muhtasibs began entering tax collection contracts with the authorities and amassed numerous agents (koloğlanları), who helped them oversee guild, market, and port activities. In addition to the mentioned qadis and ulema, those engaged in Muslim religious-legal activities included imams (mosque leaders and heads of Muslim communities in neighborhoods or districts), mudarrises (madrasa teachers), hafizes (Quran reciters), khatibs (preachers), and muezzins (mosque servants who call Muslims to prayer). Most mosque servants (except those in large congregational mosques) were laypeople who had primary professions outside their religious duties. They worked closely with mütevelli — managers of charitable foundations (waqfs) that supported mosques and madrasas — and nazirs, who oversaw expenditure. Additionally, dervish tariqas (brotherhoods) such as Bektashi and Mevlevi were popular in Istanbul. The former relied on the support of Janissaries, craft guilds, and the urban lower classes, while the latter catered to courtiers and wealthy merchants. These were followed by smaller orders like the Melami, popular among sipahis, Naqshbandi, favored by poets, and Halveti. In September 1520, Selim I died of illness, and his son Suleiman I ascended the throne (upon taking power, he executed a nephew and two grandnephews).

== Suleiman I's era ==
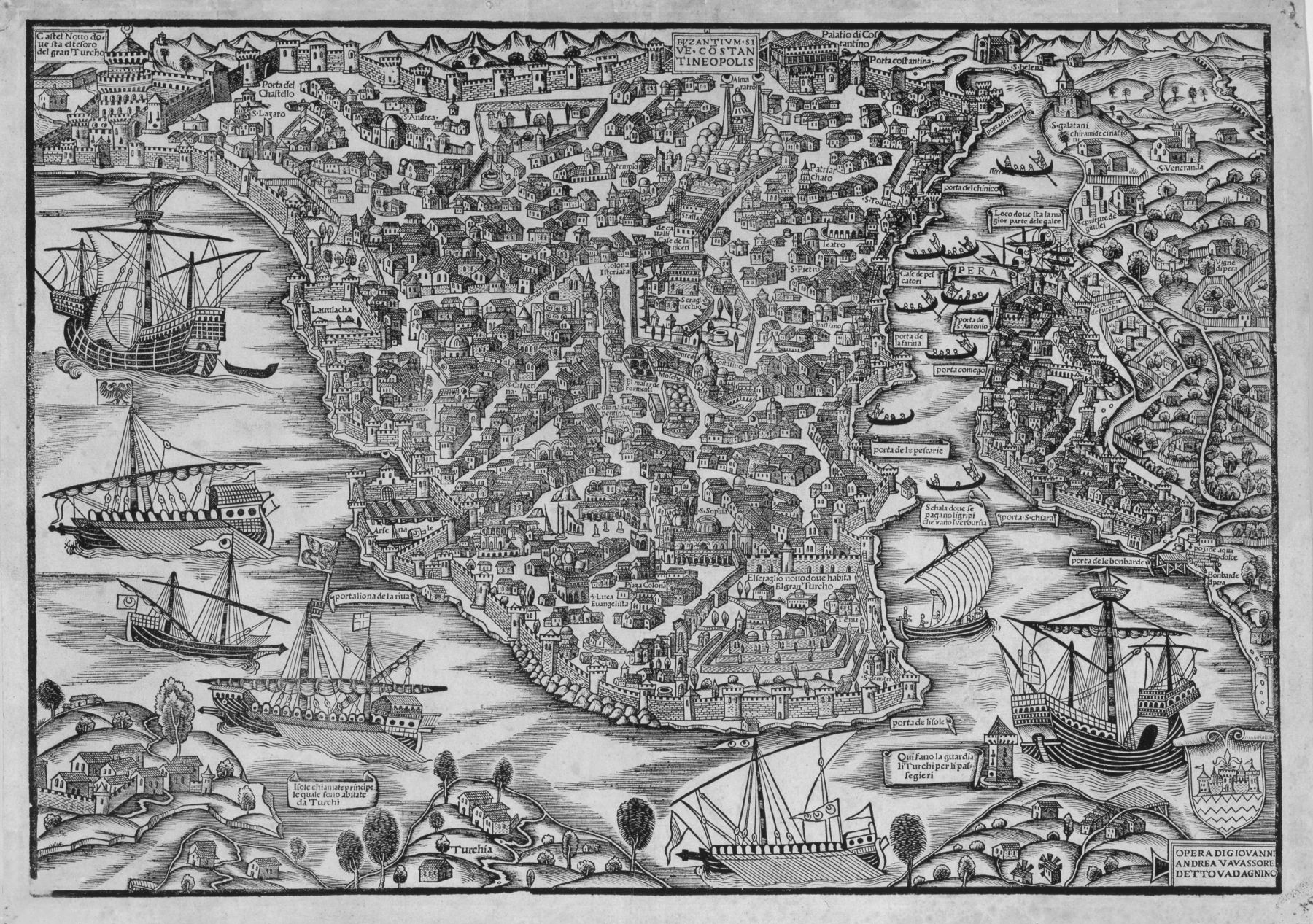
Map Byzantivm sive Costantineopolis, compiled by Giovanni Andrea Vavassore in 1535

Following the Ottoman conquest of Belgrade (1521), many Serbian artisans settled in Istanbul. In 1525, a grand mosque of Sultan Selim (or Yavuz Selim Mosque) was built on the fifth hill, where the father of Suleiman I was reburied in one of its türbes. In 1526, returning from a campaign in Hungary, the sultan brought two large candles in candelabras, which were placed on either side of the mihrab in the Hagia Sophia Mosque. During Suleiman's reign, the position of Ottoman Jews strengthened. Approximately 30,000 Jews lived in Istanbul, with 44 synagogues. The community was divided into Sephardim, Ashkenazim (immigrants from Germany and Central Europe, expelled by Ludwig of Bavaria's decree in the 15th century), "Romaniote" Jews (descendants of Byzantine Jews, the most orthodox Jewish group), Karaites, and immigrants from Italy, further subdivided into smaller communities (Castilians, Aragonese, Portuguese, etc.), each with its own synagogue. The supreme rabbi (haham), appointed by the sultan, led all Jews. In the first third of the 16th century, Istanbul had about 400,000 inhabitants living in 80,000 households (approximately 60% Muslims, 30% Christians, and about 10% Jews and other ethno-religious groups).

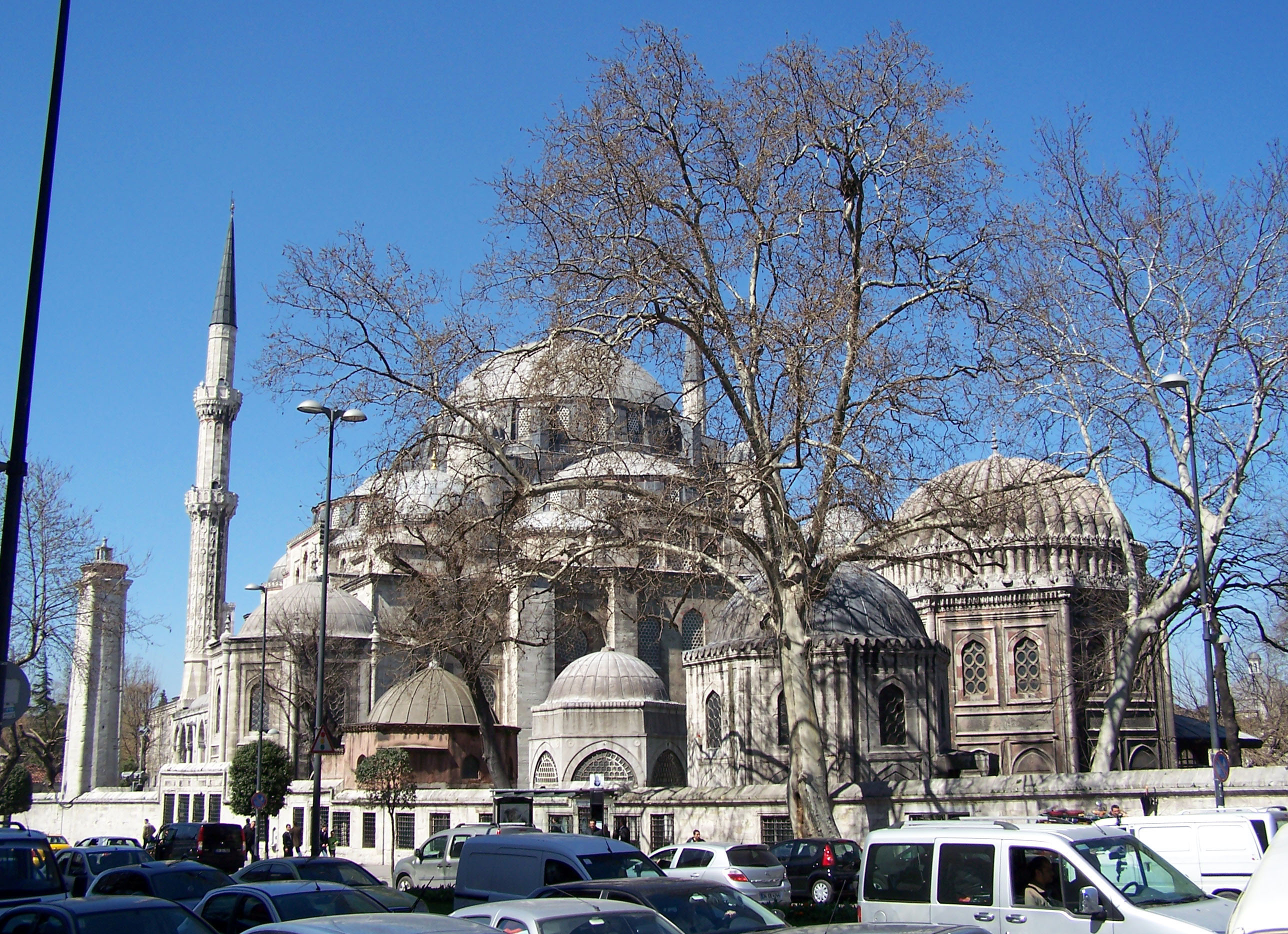
Şehzade Mosque

In March 1534, Sultan Hafsa Sultan died in Istanbul, effectively the second most influential person in the Ottoman Empire after her son (she was buried next to her husband in a türbe at the Sultan Selim Mosque). In March 1536, by the sultan's order, one of the empire's most powerful and wealthy figures, Grand Vizier Ibrahim Pasha, was strangled. His vast palace, built near the former Constantinople Hippodrome, astonished contemporaries with its luxury and grandeur. The deaths of the Valide Sultan and the Grand Vizier elevated the status of the sultan's concubine Hürrem Sultan. In 1539, Sinan became Istanbul's chief court architect (and effectively of the entire empire), transforming the appearance of the Ottoman capital. In 1546, the legendary admiral Hayreddin Barbarossa died in his Istanbul palace on the Bosphorus. He was buried with honors in a large türbe built by Sinan near the port docks of the Beşiktaş district. In 1548, Sinan completed his first major masterpiece, the Şehzade Mosque ("Mosque of the Sultan's Son" or "Prince's Mosque"), dedicated by Suleiman to his deceased son Şehzade Mehmed (also buried in the mosque's türbe alongside Prince Cihangir, Grand Vizier Rüstem Pasha, and Mehmed's wife). In the same year, at the request of Suleiman's daughter Mihrimah Sultan, Sinan built the Büyük Mosque (also known as Mihrimah Sultan Mosque or Mihrimah Mosque) in Üsküdar.

By the mid-16th century, Istanbul had approximately 500,000 inhabitants living in over 100,000 households. About 60% of the capital's population were Muslims, predominantly Turks. There were also significant communities of Arabs (from Egypt and Syria), Albanians, other Balkan Muslims, Persians, and Kurds. The largest non-Turkish group in Istanbul was the Greeks, originating from cities in Asia Minor (İzmir, Sinop, Samsun, and Trabzon), the Morea, Thrace, and Aegean islands (Thasos, Samothrace, Lesbos), as well as descendants of the few Byzantines who survived the Ottoman conquest of Constantinople. The second-largest non-Turkish group was the Armenians, natives of Asia Minor cities such as Sivas, Kayseri, Adana, Tokat, Bursa, Ankara, and Bayburt (with the community's growth, an Armenian printing press was established in Istanbul in 1565 or 1567). Following them were Jews — descendants of Byzantine Jews, Sephardim, and Ashkenazim — along with Serbs, Wallachians, Georgians, Abkhazians, Roma, and Bulgarians (the capital's Janissary corps, formed from Balkan youths, numbered about 4,000). Neighborhoods (mahalle) of Greeks, Armenians, and Jews typically formed around churches, synagogues, and residences of their spiritual leaders (the Greek Patriarch, Armenian Patriarch, and Chief Rabbi). Greeks, Armenians, and Jews held strong positions in all areas of the city's and country's economic life, dominating internal and external trade, finance (especially usury and money exchange), crafts, and medicine. In Galata, a colony of Western European immigrants — Italians, French, Dutch, and English, often called "Franks" — emerged. They engaged in trade, medical practice, and ran pharmacies and cafes. During Suleiman the Magnificent's era, Istanbul's minorities faced no fear of violence or hostility from Muslims.

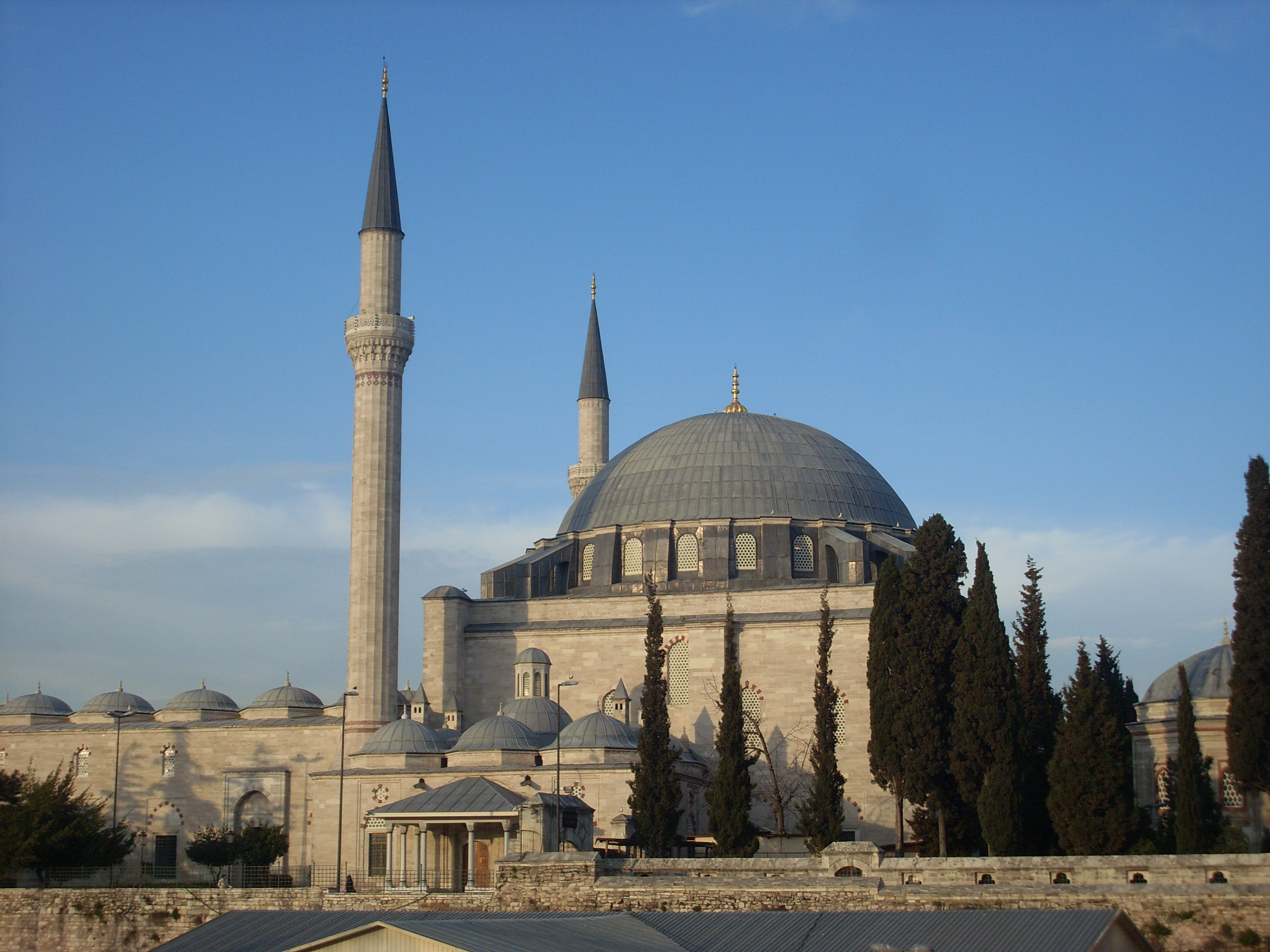
Yavuz Selim Mosque

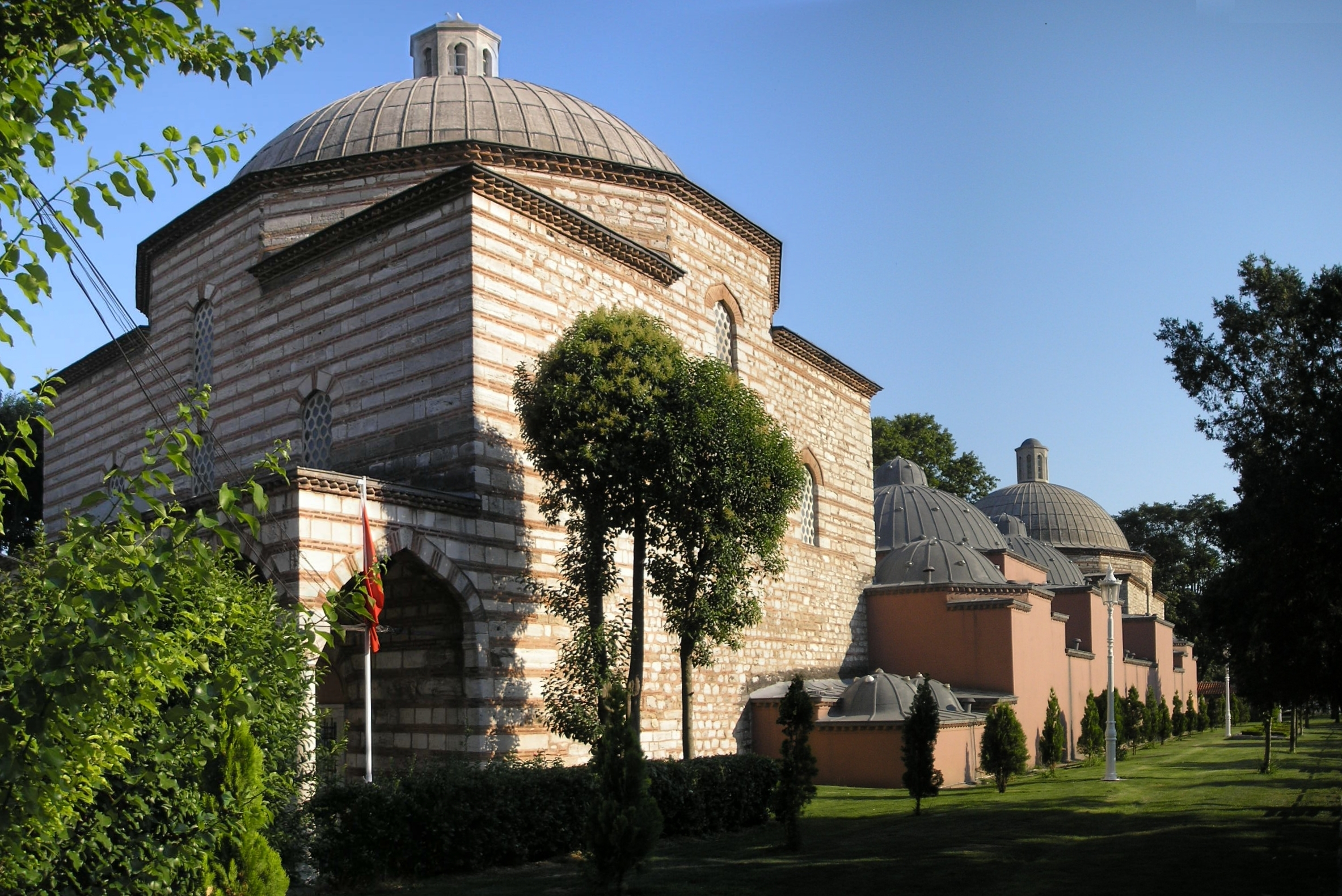
Haseki Baths

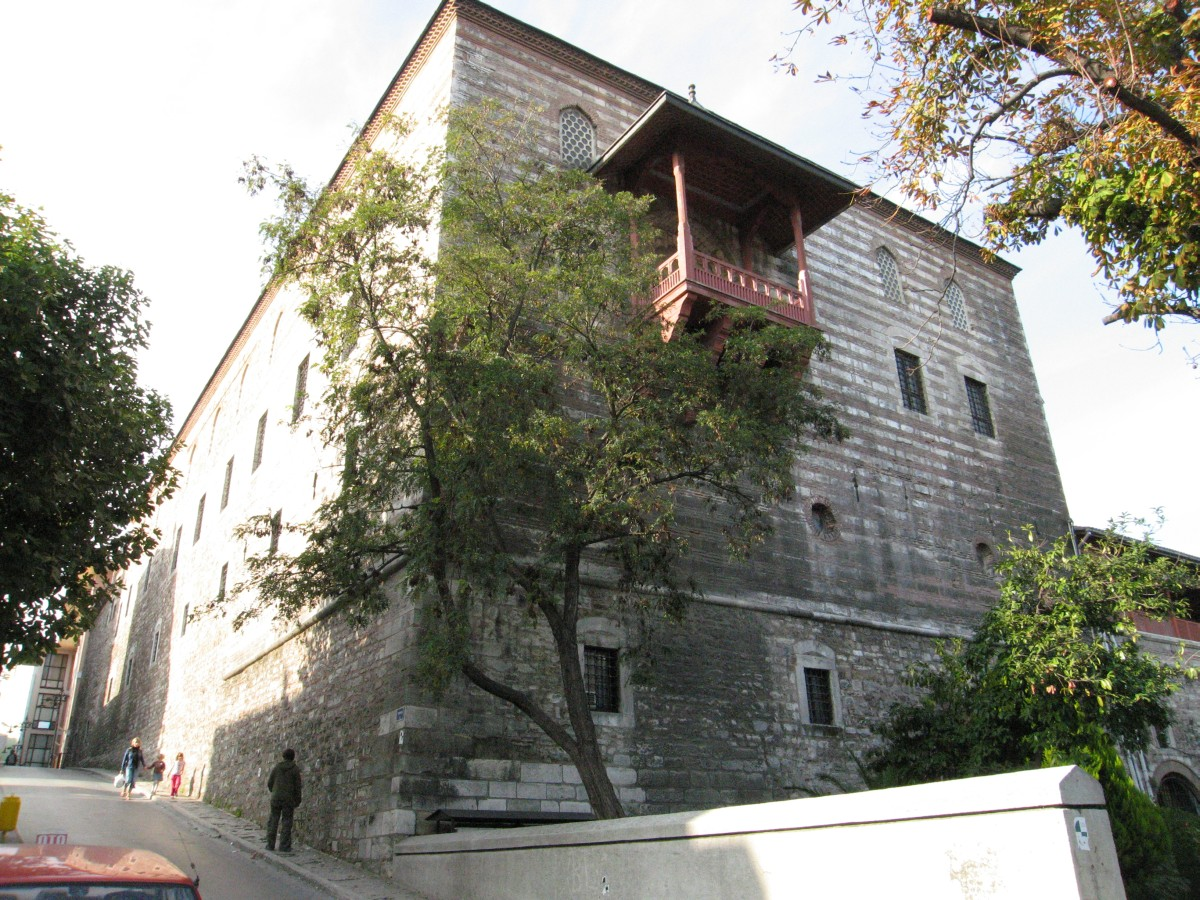
Ibrahim Pasha's Palace

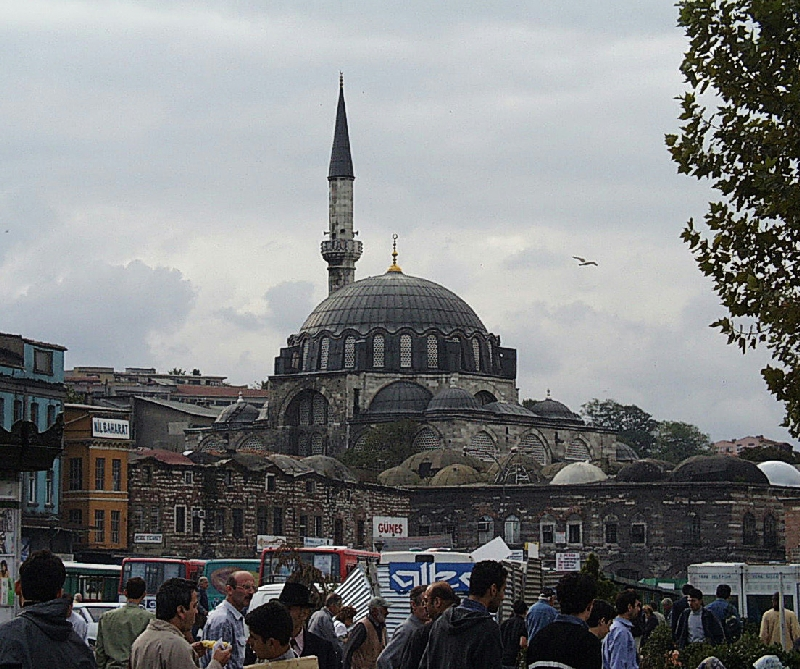
Rüstem Pasha Mosque

Greeks lived along the entire southern coast of the Golden Horn from Balat to Cibali (especially in Phanar), along the Sea of Marmara from Studion to Kumkapı and Samatya, along the land walls in the Topkapı area, along the northern coast of the Golden Horn in Galata, Tophane, Kasım Paşa, and Hasköy, in villages along the European shore of the Bosphorus and Black Sea (Arnavutköy, Tarabya, Kuruçeşme, Yeniköy, and Büyükdere), and on the Asian shore in Üsküdar and Çengelköy. Jews and Karaites lived along the Golden Horn from Eminönü to Balat (especially in the neighborhoods of Bahçekapı, Balıkpazarı, and Unkapanı), near the Edirne Gate, and in Galata and Hasköy (later, Hasköy became the main Jewish-Karaite district of Istanbul). Armenians settled in the districts of Sulumonastır, Galata, and Samatya, Arabs in Galata, Persians in Mehmetpaşa and Üsküdar, Karamanlid Greeks in Narlıkapı, Kumkapı, and Phanar, and Roma along the fortress walls (especially in Sulukule near the Edirne Gate).

Before Suleiman the Magnificent's era, nearly all foreigners in Istanbul were merchants. In 1536, capitulations were signed with France, after which Francis I sent the first official ambassador, Jean de La Forêt, accompanied by the scholar Guillaume Postel, who collected ancient and Arabic manuscripts for the royal library. The French gained the "flag right" privilege, previously exclusive to Venetians (henceforth, any European merchant, except Venetians, could trade in the Ottoman Empire only under French patronage, giving the French a significant advantage over English and Dutch competitors). The French ambassador also supported Istanbul's Genoese community, once numerous and powerful but weakened over time and left without a leader.

In 1554, Istanbul's first coffeehouse (kahvehane) opened, dedicated solely to tasting coffee recently introduced by Syrians, after which the beverage became highly popular, and coffeehouses became the city's most frequented establishments. In 1555, by the sultan's order, Grand Vizier Kara Ahmed Pasha, married to Suleiman's sister Fatma Sultan, was executed (both are buried in a türbe at the Kara Ahmed Pasha Mosque, built by Sinan a year before the vizier's execution). In 1556, Sinan built the Shah Sultan Mosque, commissioned by Suleiman's sister Shah Sultan. In the same year, Sinan constructed the luxurious Haseki Baths near Hagia Sophia for the sultan's harem, commissioned by the influential Hürrem. Hammams played a special role in Istanbul; beyond their primary function, they served as places for rest and socializing, where men spent hours conversing over coffee and hookah. The city had dozens of large and hundreds of smaller baths, many of which were outstanding architectural works. The classic hammam style was influenced by Byzantine thermae, which the Turks encountered during the Seljuk period. Thousands worked in hammam services, from stokers and cleaners to highly respected masseurs and bonesetters.

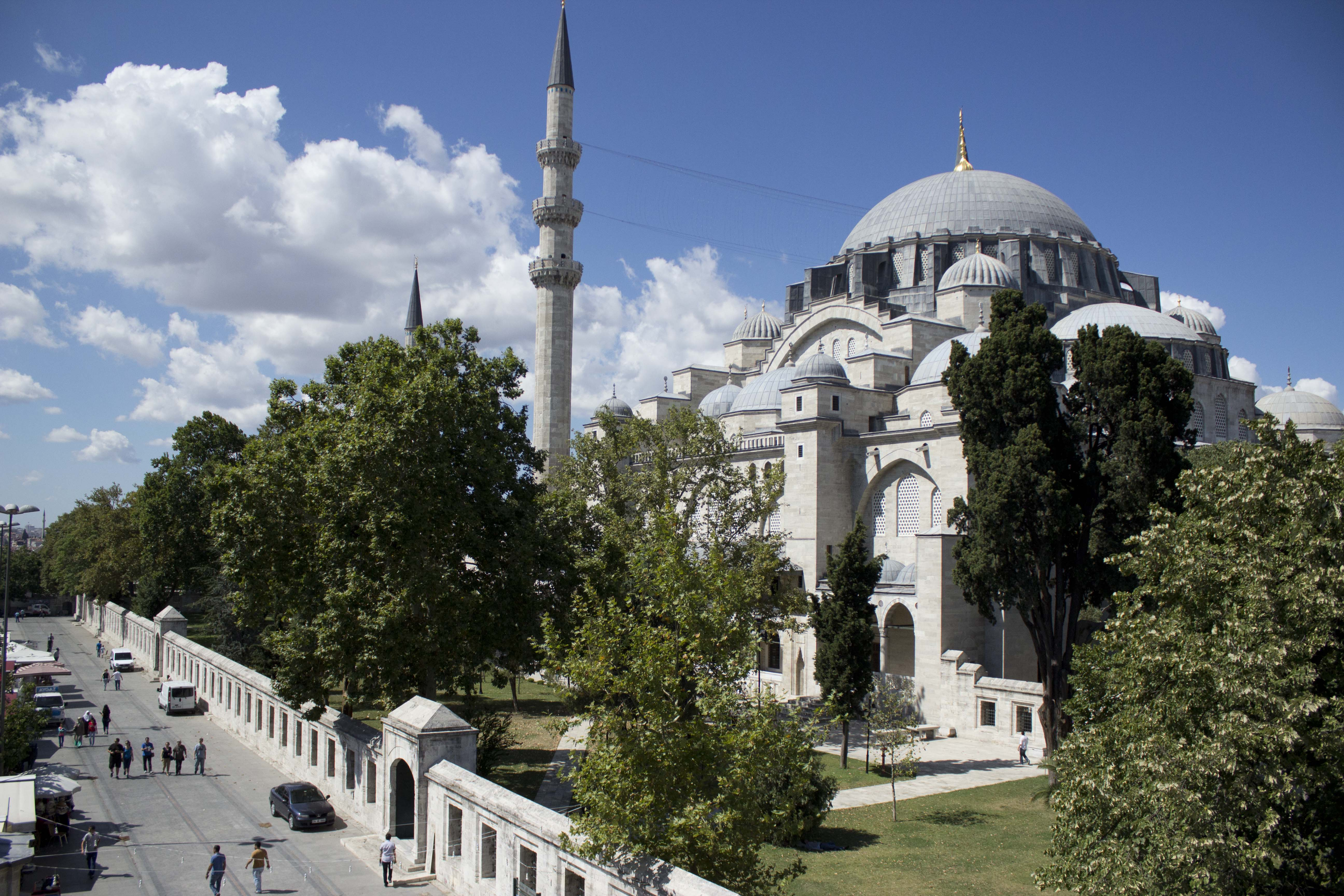
Süleymaniye Mosque

In 1557, Sinan completed another remarkable structure, the Süleymaniye Mosque, intended by the sultan to commemorate his magnificent reign. The immense construction cost and prolonged timeline irritated Suleiman, but the final result softened his displeasure (the complex included, besides the mosque, several madrasas and primary schools, a library, an observatory, a hospital, a medical school, baths, kitchens, a guesthouse, stables, and shops). It was Istanbul's first mosque with four minarets. One minaret, later called the "Jewel Minaret," was adorned with gifts from the Persian Shah Tahmasp I, sent to Suleiman as a taunt. Several granite columns supporting the side arcades previously stood on the Augusteion square and in the palace of Justinian I. In the mosque's courtyard, Suleiman the Magnificent and his beloved wife Hürrem Sultan (who died in April 1558) are buried in two richly decorated türbes.

In 1558, fearing frequent fires, authorities issued a decree banning new house construction near Istanbul's fortress walls. In 1562, the former concubine Gülfem Hatun was strangled in the capital (buried in the Gülfem Hatun Mosque in Üsküdar, built with her funds). In 1563, Sinan completed the Rüstem Pasha Mosque on the Golden Horn's shore, renowned for its lavish interior decoration, ranking among Istanbul's finest mosques. Sinan also designed several noble palaces, the Tiriyaki Market, and a madrasa in Üsküdar, which became a model for large structures of its type. It featured a two-story gallery surrounding a rectangular courtyard with a small fountain at its center. Bedestans — massive stone buildings with iron gates and grilles, vaulted ceilings, and domes supported by columns — played a significant role in Istanbul's retail trade (by the 16th century, the city had three). Inside bedestans, dozens of small shops and workshops sold jewelry, expensive fabrics, ceramics, incense, and spices (these trading spaces were arranged in walls and pilasters like niches).

The maritime arsenal in Kasım Paşa gained prominence, with its shipyards launching 40 to 50 large galleys annually at peak production (some sources claim about 30,000 Christian slaves from Western Europe, Crimea, and the Tsardom of Russia worked there). The arsenal's workshops received ship timber from the Black Sea and Asia Minor, bitumen, tar, and resin from Albania, İzmir, and Lesbos, iron and tin from Thessaloniki, the Danube regions, and England, copper from Anatolian mines, fat from Kaffa, Varna, and Chios, hemp from Egypt and Asia Minor, rigging and ropes from Trabzon, and canvas from Anatolia, Mingrelia, and Egypt. From the mid-16th century, Galata's port (docks in Karaköy and Tophane) saw increased activity, hosting ships from Genoa, Venice, France, England, and the Netherlands. Jews often acted as intermediaries between "Franks" and Ottoman authorities, collecting customs duties, residence and security taxes, and assisting with permits for sailing in Turkish waters and cargo operations.

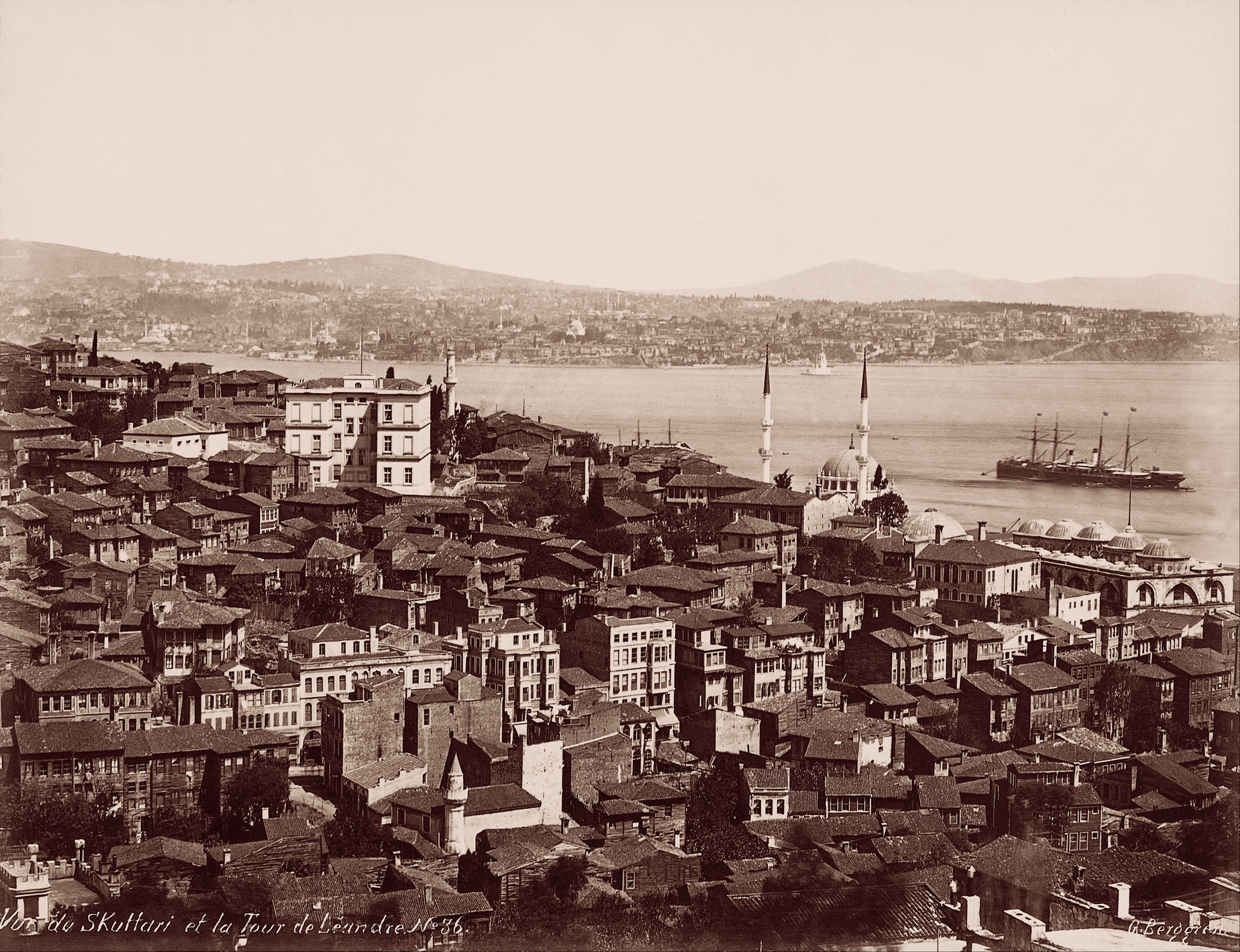
Tophane

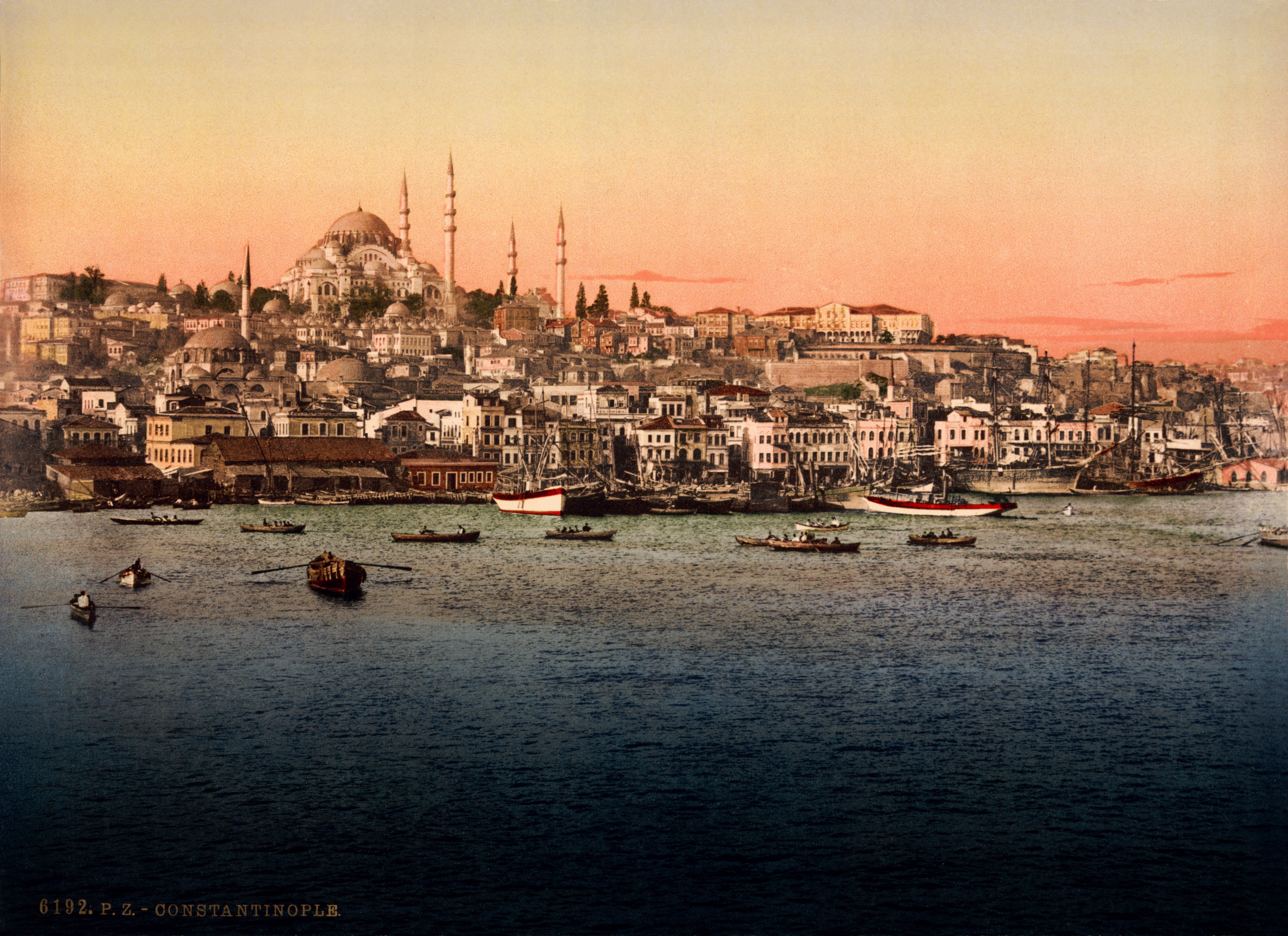
Bosphorus

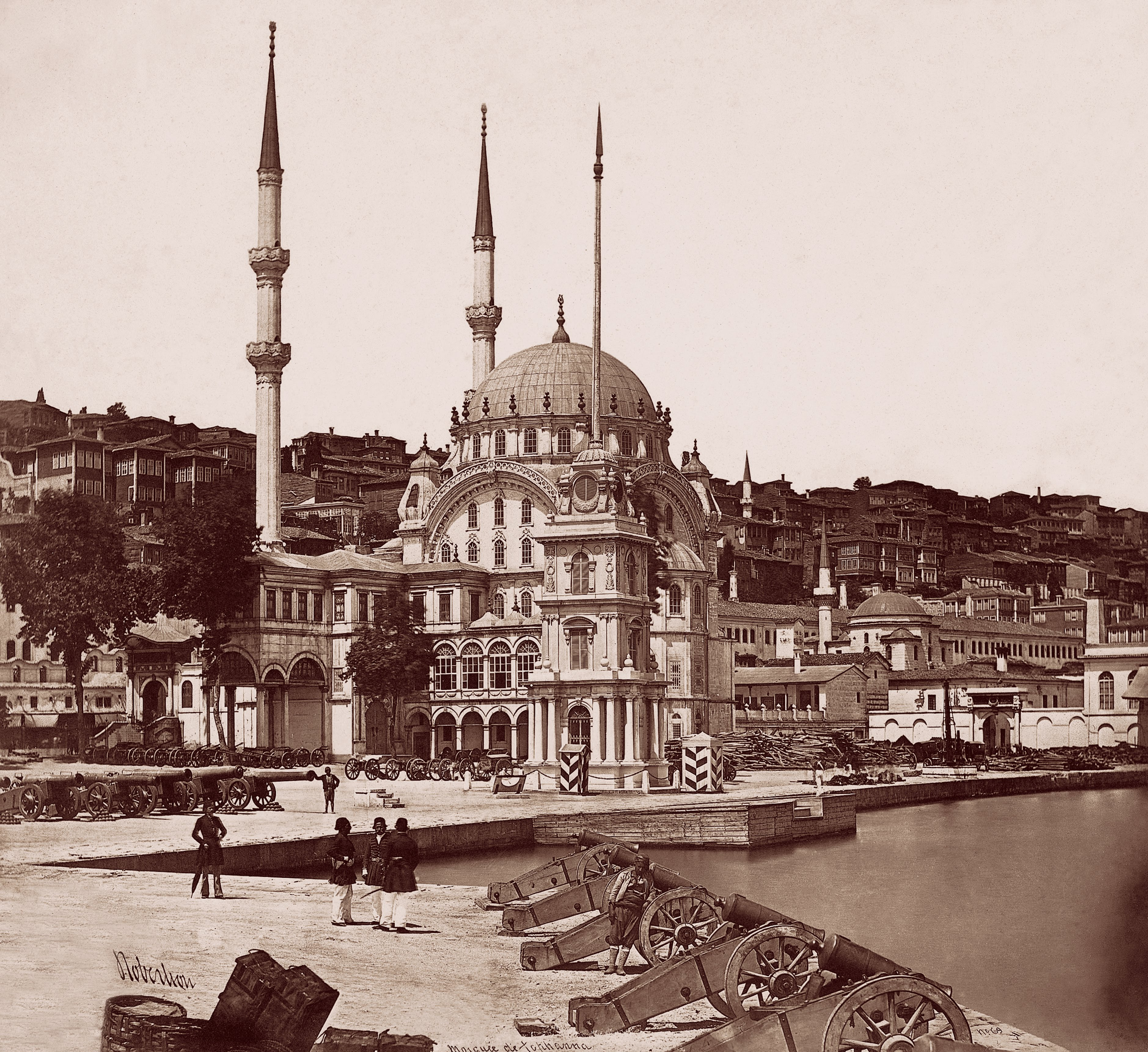
Tophane

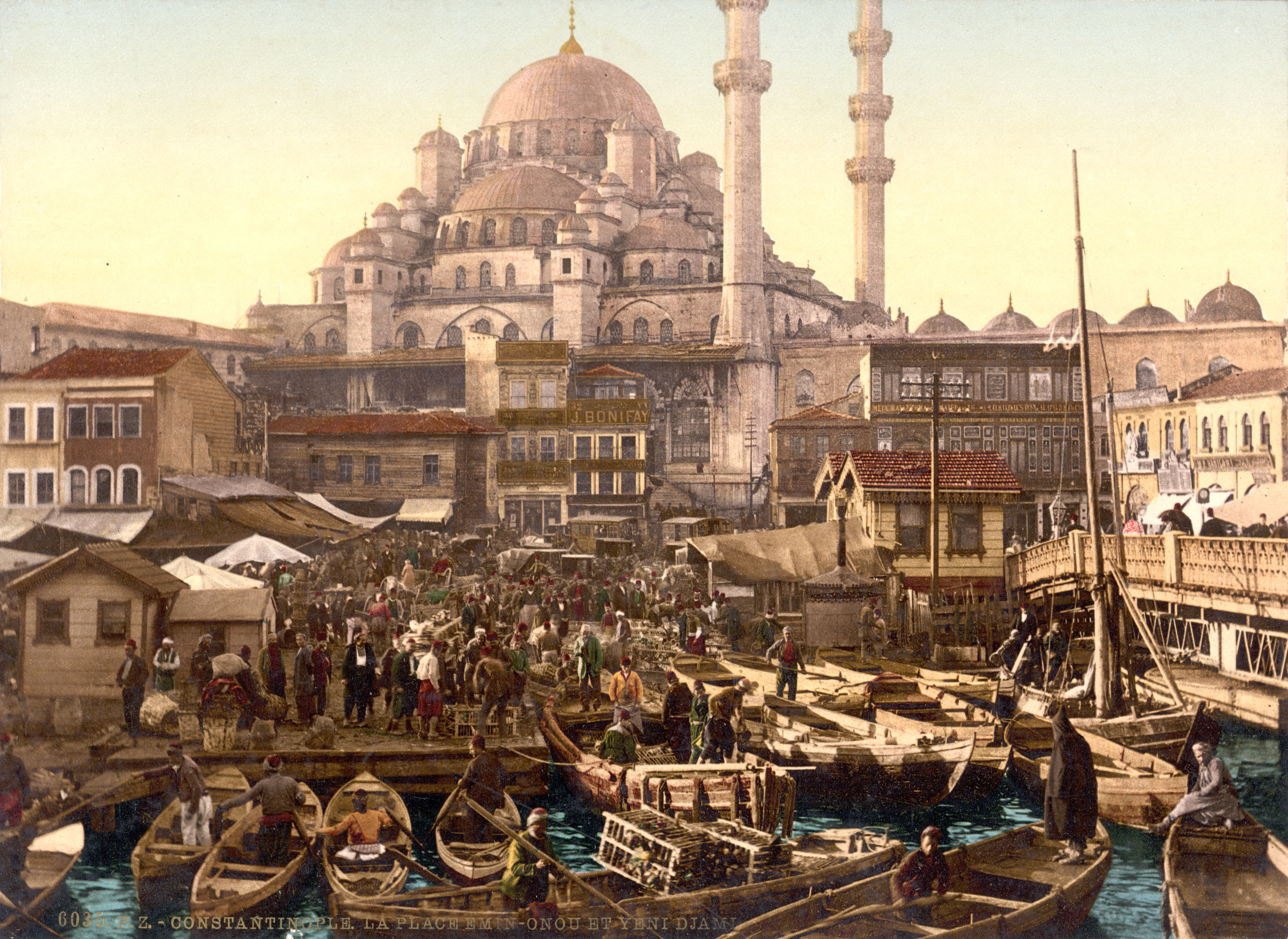
Eminönü

Around Galata's docks, a bustling crowd of sailors, porters, merchants, agents of traders and embassies, middlemen, scribes, officials, and Janissaries guarding ships and maintaining order was always present. On the southern shore of the Golden Horn, from Bahçekapı to Balat, docks primarily served Turkish and Greek ships engaged in cabotage along the Black, Marmara, and Aegean Seas, and eastern Mediterranean, delivering food and raw materials for artisan workshops. The Meydan İskelesi and Bahçekapı docks received food ships from İzmit, the Black Sea, Greece, and Egypt; the busiest Eminönü dock, along with Hısır İskelesi, Zindankapısı, and Yemiş, handled ships with food from western Asia Minor (mainly fresh vegetables, fruits, and fish); the Odun İskelesi dock received ships with firewood and construction timber from İzmit; the Ayazmakapısı dock handled food ships from Eastern Thrace; the Unkapanı dock received grain and flour ships from Thrace, Crimea, Romania, and Bulgaria; and the Balat dock served ships with goods from various Mediterranean countries. Along this dock strip were private and state warehouses, granaries, markets, shops, artisan workshops, guesthouses, and inexpensive eateries for sailors and porters.

Lively maritime connections linked Istanbul with ports like Tekirdağ, Mudanya, Bandırma, Erdek, Sinop, Trabzon, Kaffa, Tenedos, Thessaloniki, İzmir, Modon, Rhodes, Antakya, Latakia, Tripoli, Beirut, and Alexandria (dominated by Turkish and Greek shipowners), as well as Venice, Ragusa, Corfu, Livorno, Marseille, and Seville (dominated by "Frankish" ships). Overland routes were significant, especially the "Sultan's Road" from Istanbul to Edirne (used by sultan's processions, caravans with grain, and livestock to the capital, and Ottoman army units heading west). From Edirne, major roads branched to Bulgaria, Wallachia, Macedonia, Greece, Bosnia, and Dalmatia. In the Asian part of the empire, the Istanbul – İzmit road was key, with routes diverging to Persia (via Ankara, Sivas, and Erzurum) and Syria (via Eskişehir, Konya, Adana, and Aleppo), and to İzmir (via Bursa and Manisa). Istanbul maintained regular caravan connections with İzmir (weekly), Kraków (monthly), Persia (every two months), Cilicia, Aleppo, Georgia, and Gilan (every three months), Basra (every six months), and Ragusa (yearly).

During Suleiman the Magnificent's reign, Istanbul saw a cultural and scientific flourishing, with poets Bâkî, Zati, and Hayati, chronicler-writers Kemal Pasha-zade, Cemali (Sheikh-ul-Islam), and Lütfi, cartographer Piri Reis, geographer and astronomer Seydi Ali Reis, and miniaturist painter Nigari. The sultan's court employed numerous artists, writers, poets, chroniclers, miniaturists, calligraphers, architects, and jewelers from across the empire and beyond. Other intellectual hubs included the mansions of wealthy patrons, dervish lodges, city parks, coffeehouses, and Galata's taverns. Funded by the sultan and court nobility, religious and public buildings (mosques, madrasas, libraries, baths, charitable kitchens, and dining halls), as well as fountains and wells, were constructed. Under Suleiman, the Topkapı Palace was rebuilt and expanded, becoming the core of Istanbul's administrative quarter, and the water supply system (cisterns, aqueducts, and drains) was restored and enlarged. In 1564, the previously captured Volhynian magnate Dmytro Vyshnevetsky was executed in Istanbul by hanging by the ribs. In September 1566, Suleiman I died during a military campaign in Hungary, and his son Selim II ascended the throne.

== Selim II's era ==
Map Byzantium nunc Constantinopolis, compiled by Georg Braun and Frans Hogenberg in 1572

During the reign of Selim II, a Portuguese Jew, Joseph Nasi, rose to prominence at the sultan's court. He was the nephew of the wealthy owner of a trading and banking house, Gracia Mendes Nasi, who died in the Ottoman capital in 1569. She built a synagogue, a yeshiva, a hospital, and shelters for poor Jews in Istanbul, supported Jewish scholars, and aided Marrano immigrants in settling. Joseph Nasi, residing in the luxurious Belvedere Palace in a suburb of the capital, became the ruler of Naxos and neighboring Archipelago islands, took over the wine trade monopoly in the Ottoman Empire, and established an extensive espionage network in Europe, supplying the sultan's court with the latest news and rumors. Nasi, personally acquainted with many European political figures, significantly influenced the empire's foreign policy. Additionally, he funded the establishment of a yeshiva and a large library in Istanbul, and his widow founded a Jewish printing press.

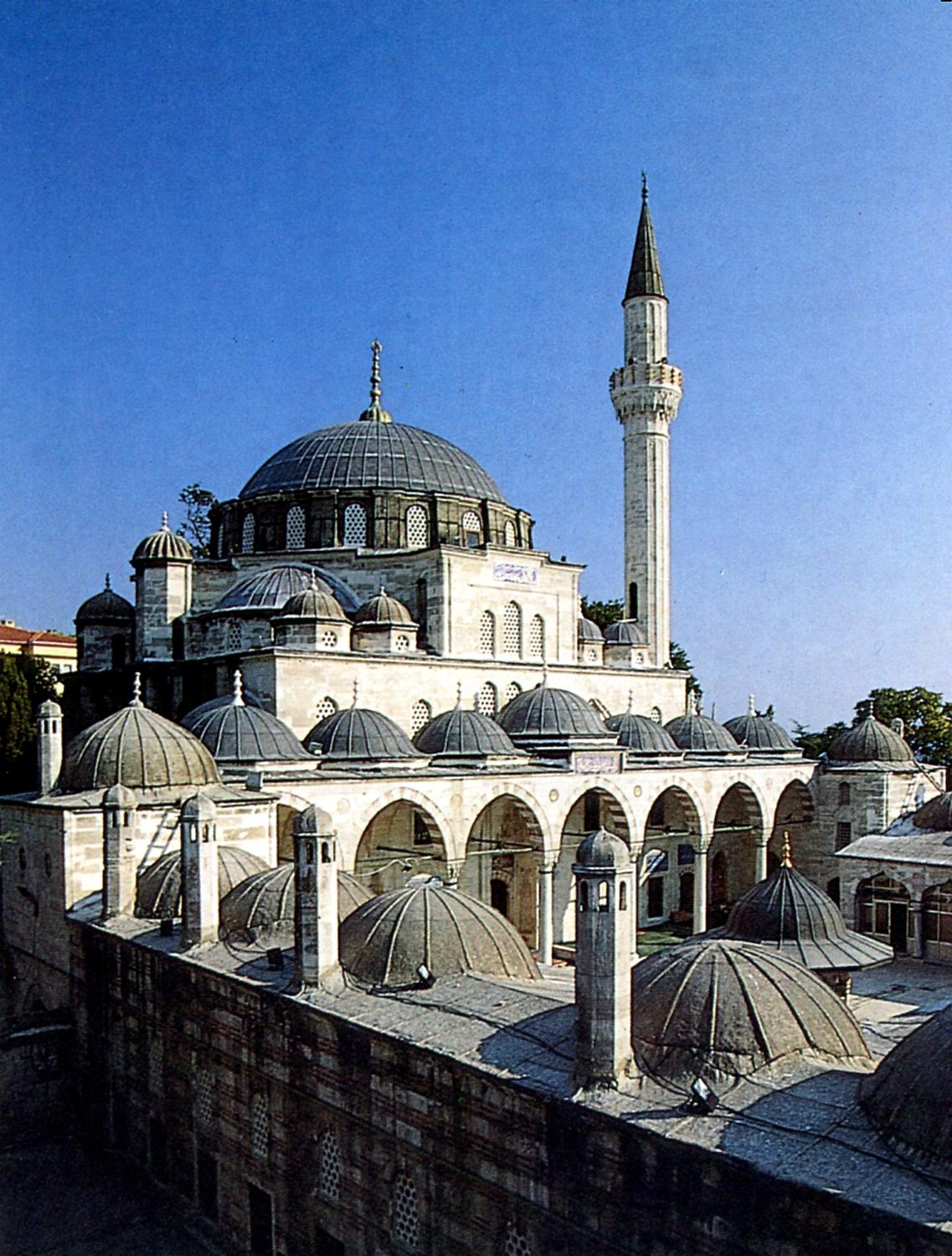
Sokollu Mehmet Pasha Mosque

Due to the absence of firefighting teams, fires caused significant damage to the city's wooden structures. In 1572, decrees were issued requiring every homeowner to have a ladder matching the height of their house and a water barrel, and prohibiting construction near mosques. The latter decree remained unenforced, and merchants even built shops between the buttresses of Hagia Sophia. In the same year, Sinan designed the Sokollu Mehmet Pasha Mosque, funded by the Grand Vizier and son-in-law of the sultan, Sokollu Mehmet Pasha. In 1573, by Selim II's order, an examination was conducted among Istanbul's practicing physicians, and exams were introduced for medical students. Also in 1573, in the Kasım Paşa district at the foot of the Okmeydan hill, Sinan built the Piyale Pasha Mosque, commissioned by the influential Kapudan Pasha and vizier Piyale Pasha. The maritime arsenal in Kasım Paşa, established under Mehmed the Conqueror and expanded under Suleiman the Magnificent, continued to develop during Selim II's reign. The workers' settlement at the arsenal was inhabited by Greek and Georgian artisans skilled in shipbuilding and blacksmithing. (Note: The arsenal, surrounded by a fortress wall, included large shipyards, various auxiliary workshops and warehouses, the residence and office of the Kapudan Pasha and his retinue (equivalent to a naval ministry), barracks for officers, engineers, sailors, and guards, and a vast prison for slaves who worked in the arsenal and as rowers on Ottoman galleys.) As under his predecessor, Istanbul experienced no food shortages or street disturbances during Selim II's reign. Selim II died in December 1574 in the sultan's harem and was buried in a hexagonal türbe in the courtyard of the Hagia Sophia Mosque. Shortly thereafter, his five sons (or, according to some sources, 17), along with his wives and five daughters, were strangled by order of Murad III upon his ascension to the throne.

== Murad III's era ==
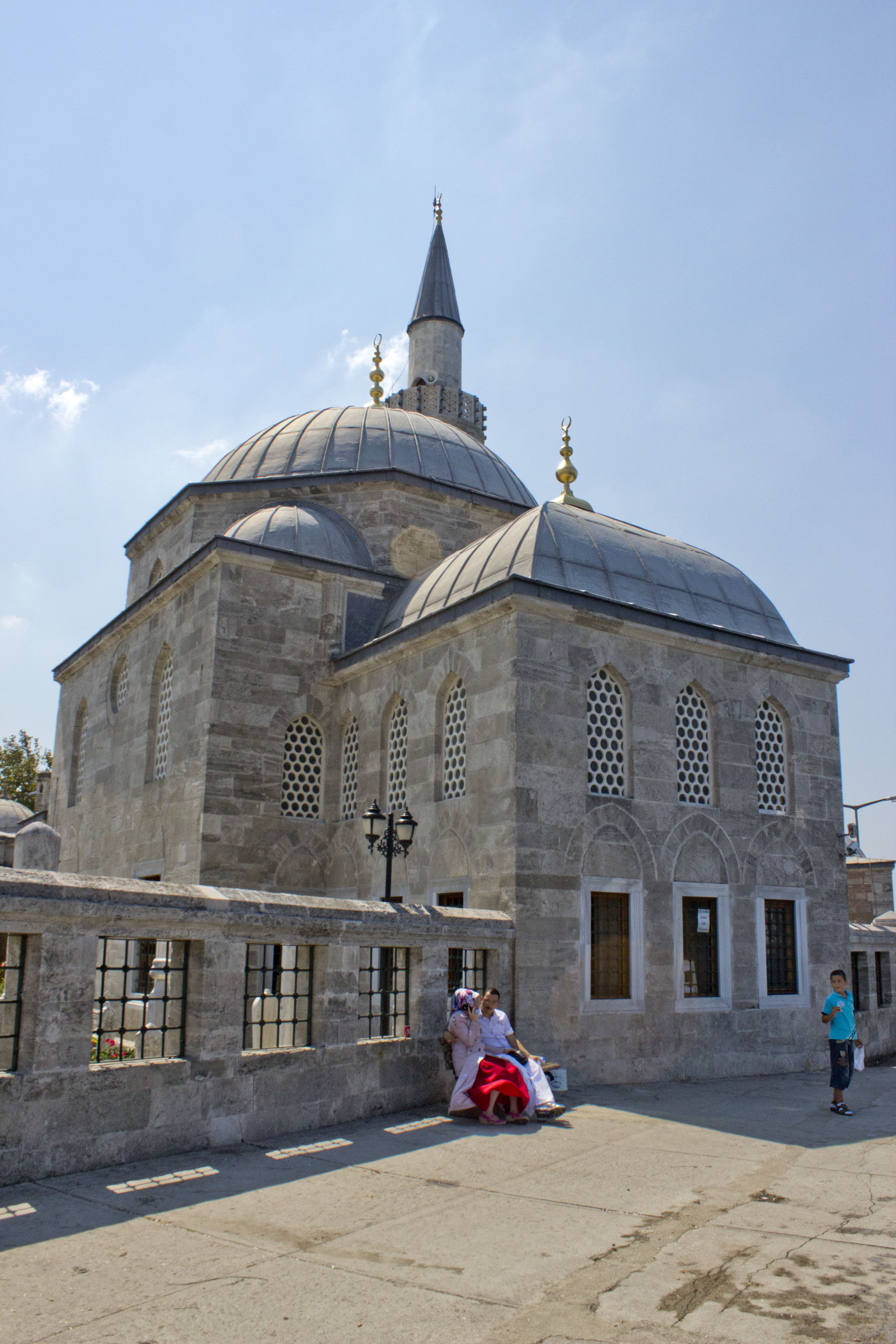
Şemsi Pasha Mosque

In 1578, by the sultan's decree, an observatory was opened in Istanbul, where the distinguished astronomer and mathematician Taqi al-Din worked. In October 1579, the Grand Vizier and one of the empire's most influential figures, Sokollu Mehmet Pasha, was assassinated in Istanbul. In 1580, the English gained the coveted "flag right" privilege, soon establishing the Levant Company and quickly surpassing French merchants in Istanbul (by 1640, the Ottoman capital hosted 25 English trading houses). In 1581, the Şemsi Pasha Mosque was built on the Üsküdar waterfront, designed by Sinan. In June 1582, a grand celebration marking the circumcision of the sultan's son Mehmed was held at the Hippodrome square. Significant influence during Murad III's reign was wielded by Grand Vizier Siyavuş Pasha (1582–1584, 1586–1589, and 1592–1593), who built a 300-room palace near the Süleymaniye Mosque, and the prominent theologian and historian Saadettin Efendi. In December 1583, valide Sultan Nurbanu Sultan, who held immense authority at court but rivaled her son's concubine Safiye Sultan, died. The court factions of these women constantly schemed against each other, appointing and dismissing high-ranking imperial officials. In 1585, the sultan led a successful campaign against the Persians in the Caucasus, but upon his return, he ordered the closure of all Orthodox churches in the capital. The residence of the Constantinople Patriarch was converted into the Fethiye Mosque, and the patriarch took refuge in the courtyard of the Alexandrian Patriarchate at the Church of Theotokos, then at the Church of Saint Demetrius.

During Murad III's reign, the Topkapı Palace was further expanded, and two alabaster vessels (each with a capacity of 1,200 liters), brought by the sultan from Pergamon, were placed on either side of the main entrance to the Hagia Sophia Mosque. Under pressure from the ulema, the sultan once ordered the closure of all coffeehouses and declared coffee consumption sinful, but this decree was never enforced in practice. In February 1588, the architect Sinan died, after which Ottoman architecture lost some of its former monumentality but continued to thrive, largely due to Sinan's students. He was buried in a türbe of his own design near the Süleymaniye Mosque's enclosure. Murad III's reign saw a rise in bribery and nepotism, while the wars with Iran weakened the army and drained the empire's finances. After suppressing a Janissary uprising in April 1589, Koca Sinan Pasha was appointed Grand Vizier for the second time, but another Janissary revolt in August 1591 led to his dismissal. In January 1595, Murad III died and was buried in a square türbe in the courtyard of the Hagia Sophia Mosque, alongside his relatives, including his sons (19 brothers and seven concubines of his father were executed by Mehmed III upon his ascension).

== Mehmed III's era ==
Having executed his brothers, the new sultan feared conspiracies even from his sons. He forbade them from governing provinces, as was customary, instead confining them to a separate pavilion in the sultan's palace called the "Kafes" ("Cage"). The Valide Sultan Safiye Sultan, who outlived her son, held significant influence at Mehmed III's court. By her order, construction began on the grand New Mosque, with the site chosen in a Jewish commercial quarter near the old port. During the clearing of the site, Jews and Karaites were expelled to a new location in the Hasköy quarter near Galata. In 1599, Queen Elizabeth I sent the sultan an organ as a gesture of friendship, accompanied by its creator, master Thomas Dallam, who was astonished by the opulence of the palace chambers and the splendor of court ceremonies, which he recounted upon returning to Europe. During Mehmed III's reign, tobacco use became fashionable, and soon both men and women began smoking pipes (çubuk) and hookahs. The finest tobacco arrived in Istanbul from Thessaloniki, Asia Minor, and Latakia.

At the turn of the 16th to 17th centuries, Istanbul's port remained a major hub for international and transit trade. Dozens of ships from various countries docked daily in the Golden Horn harbor, with European merchants' ships preferring to moor at Galata's docks. Istanbul thrived on trade in imported goods, ensuring food supplies for residents, raw materials for artisans, and luxury items for the court and nobility. Additionally, the slave trade flourished, with tens of thousands of captives passing through Istanbul's slave market annually. Over 15,000 boatmen, forming a powerful corporation, handled the transport of people and goods across the Bosphorus and Golden Horn. This corporation included peremecis (boatmen transporting only people and their personal luggage), kaıkçıs (owners of medium-sized cabotage vessels), and sandalcıs (owners of large galleys). Construction was a vital sector of the city's economy. In the 16th century, around 30 large mosques were built in Istanbul, while in the entire 17th century, only six mosques were constructed, of which just two were large.

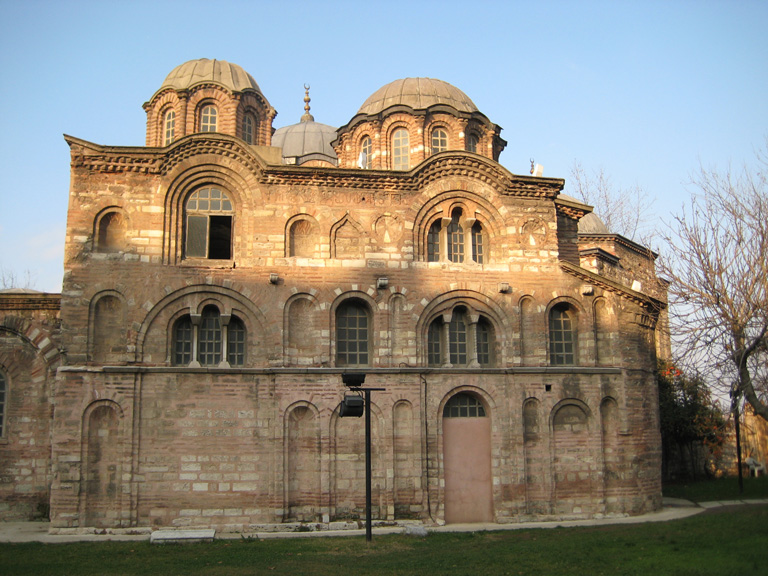
Fethiye Mosque

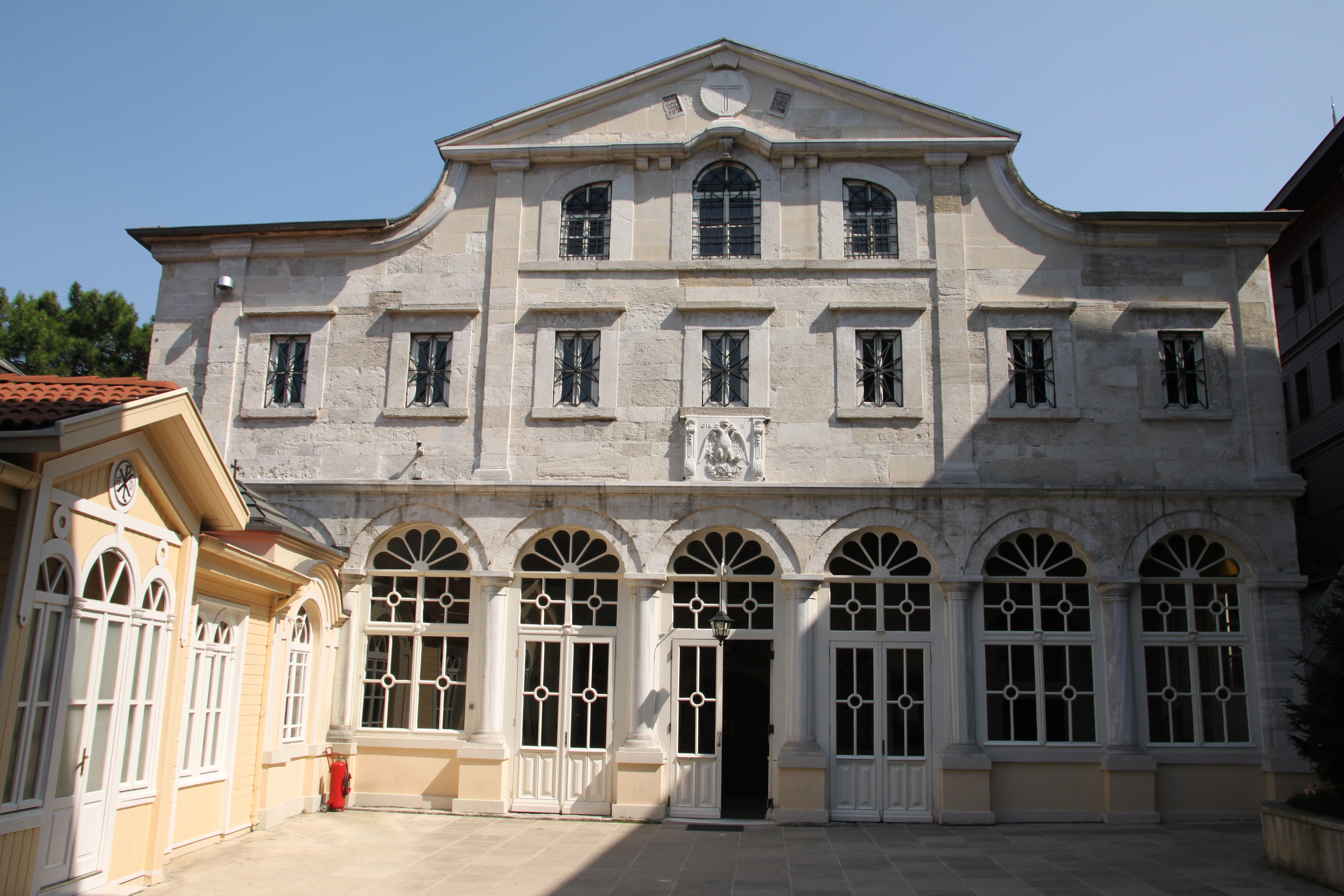
Church of Saint George

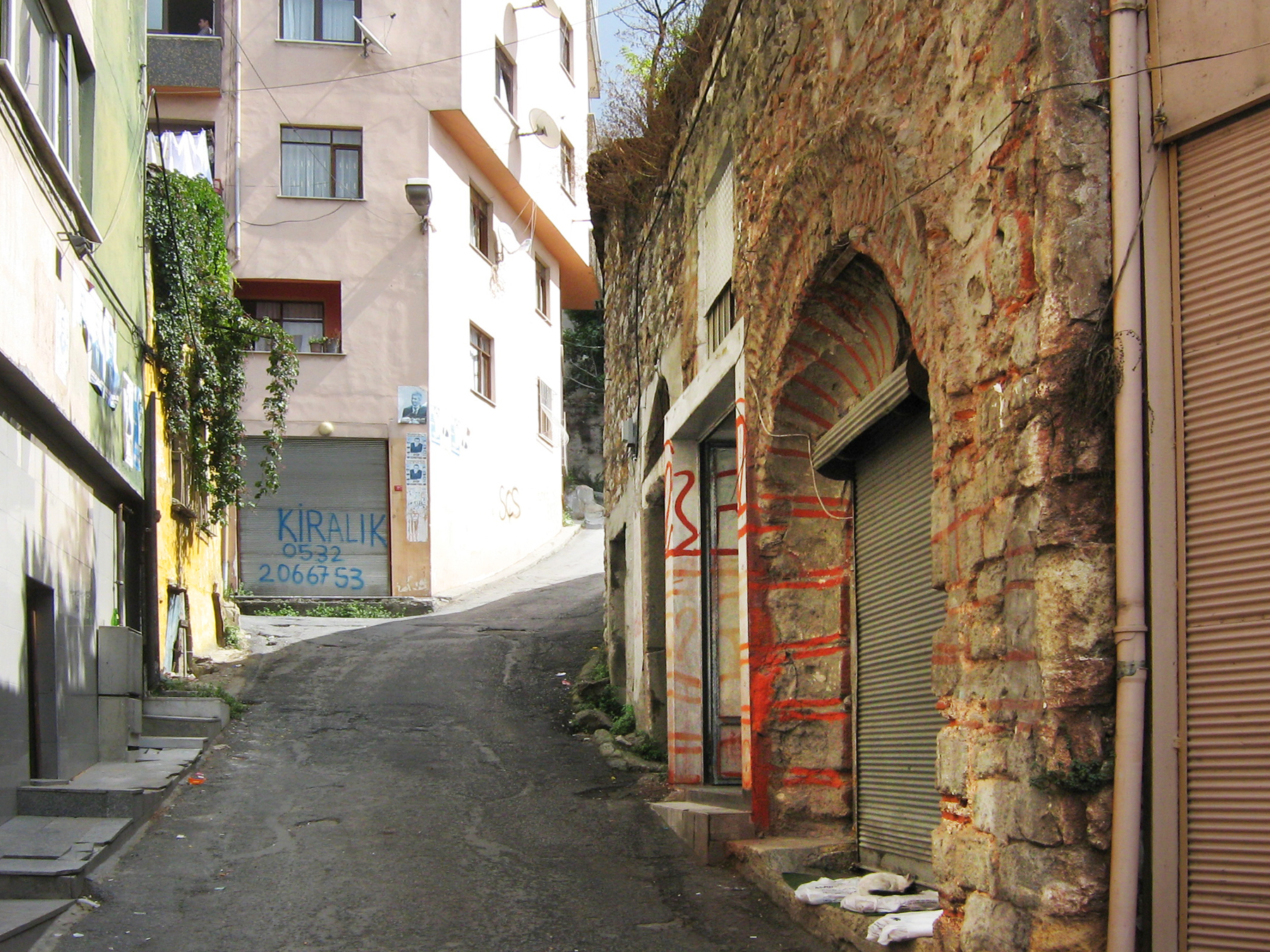
Synagogue in the Hasköy quarter

After numerous requests and bribes, the Turks permitted the renovation of the Church of Saint George in the Phanar district, which, from 1601, became the cathedral and residence of the Constantinople Patriarch. All surviving Christian relics in Istanbul, including the Column of the Flagellation to which Jesus Christ was bound, as well as highly venerated relics and icons, were relocated there. Gradually, a Christian quarter formed around the patriarch's residence in Phanar, where influential Greek families settled. During Mehmed III's reign, the prominent historian and senior official Mustafa Ali, author of The Essence of News, and the historian Mustafa Selaniki worked in Istanbul. In December 1603, Mehmed III died and was buried in an octagonal türbe in the courtyard of the Hagia Sophia Mosque. His son Ahmed I ascended the throne, sparing his younger brother Mustafa, contrary to tradition.

== Ahmed I's era ==
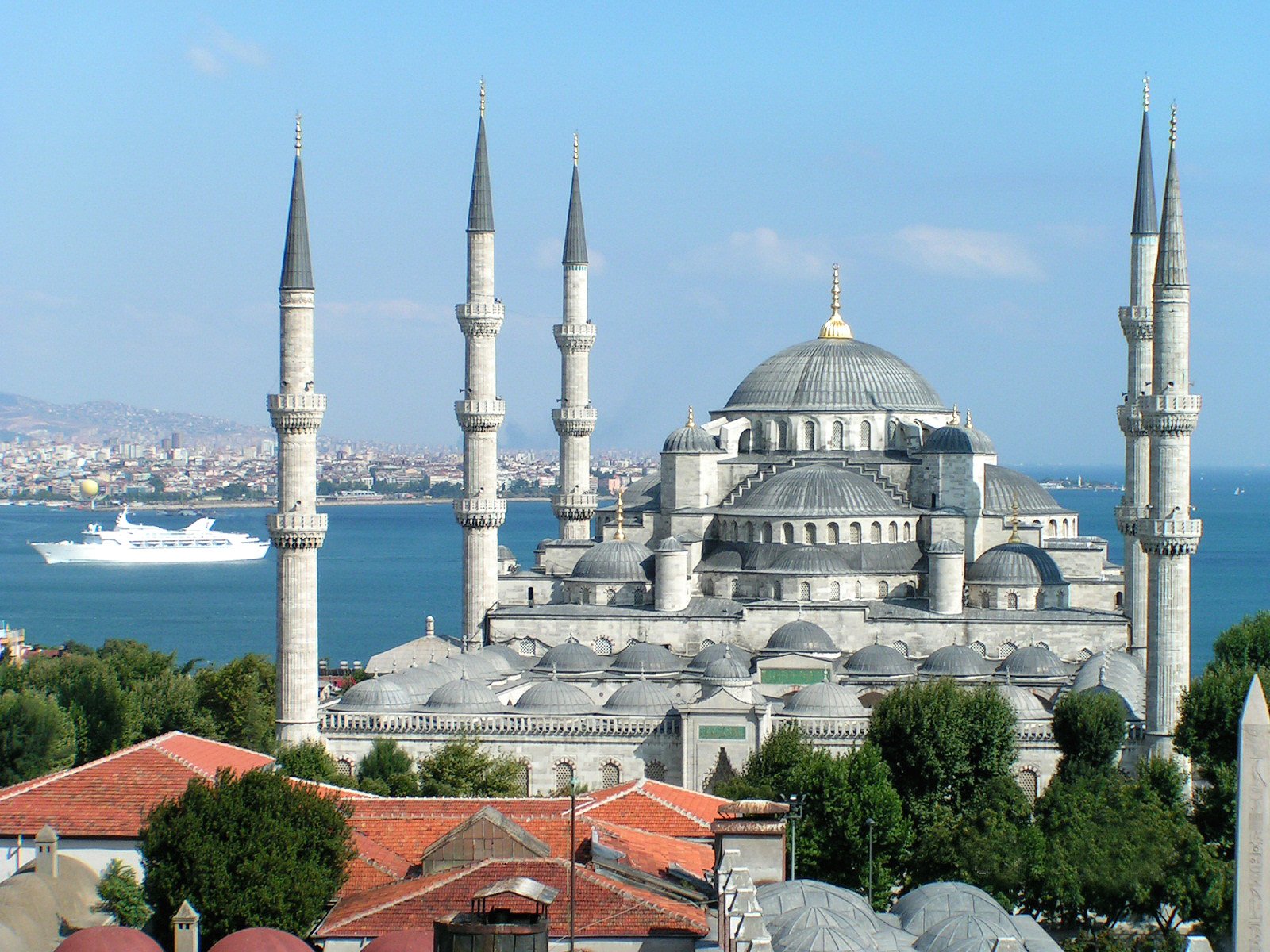
Sultan Ahmed Mosque

At the beginning of the 17th century, a significant number of Armenians from eastern Anatolia settled in Istanbul. In November 1605, two influential women passed away in the capital: the former Valide Sultan Safiye Sultan (likely died of natural causes in the Old Palace) and the acting Valide Sultan Handan Sultan. In 1609, construction began on the Sultan Ahmed Mosque, opposite Hagia Sophia, requiring the demolition of the western stands of the Byzantine Hippodrome, including remnants of the imperial box, as well as many structures of the ruined Great Imperial Palace. The grandiose project was designed by one of Sinan's most talented students, architect Mehmed Agha. Construction was completed in 1616, after which the Blue Mosque became Istanbul's most significant mosque and one of the city's symbols. It impressed with its size (capable of accommodating 35,000 worshippers at once) and its unusual six minarets (according to legend, the hard-of-hearing architect misunderstood Ahmed's order to build "golden minarets" or "altın minare," hearing instead "six minarets," or "altı minare"). (Note: Another tradition claims that the sultan aimed to surpass Hagia Sophia in every way and indeed ordered six minarets. However, he was soon criticized for diminishing the mosque in Mecca, which had five minarets. Ahmed refused to alter his mosque but ordered the addition of two more minarets in Mecca.) The mosque's extensive complex included a madrasa, a hospital, several almshouses, kitchens, and a caravanserai. The madrasa of the Sultan Ahmed Mosque ranked among the most prestigious schools, alongside those of the Bayezid, Fatih, Sultan Ahmed, and Süleymaniye mosques.

The central thoroughfare of Istanbul was the wide and beautiful Divan Yolu street, along which the sultan's cortege frequently traveled during processions, crossing the entire city from the Edirne Gate to the Topkapı Palace (it closely followed the line of Constantinople's main street, Mese). Key nodes along Divan Yolu included Beyazıt Square (on the site of the Forum of Theodosius) and Çemberlitaş Square (on the site of the Forum of Constantine). However, the other streets of Istanbul were narrow, winding, gloomy, and mostly unpaved. They were notoriously dirty, especially after rain, so prominent citizens traveled the capital on horseback or in carriages. Stone construction was primarily reserved for the palaces of the nobility, homes of wealthy merchants, mosques, and bathhouses. The majority of buildings — houses of artisans, small traders, and officials, as well as most small shops and workshops — were made of clay and wood, lacking architectural embellishments. Frequent fires forced authorities to issue decrees mandating that houses and shops be built from stone and adobe, with minimal use of wood. However, these decrees were not strictly enforced, and the number of wooden structures in Istanbul remained significant for a long time.

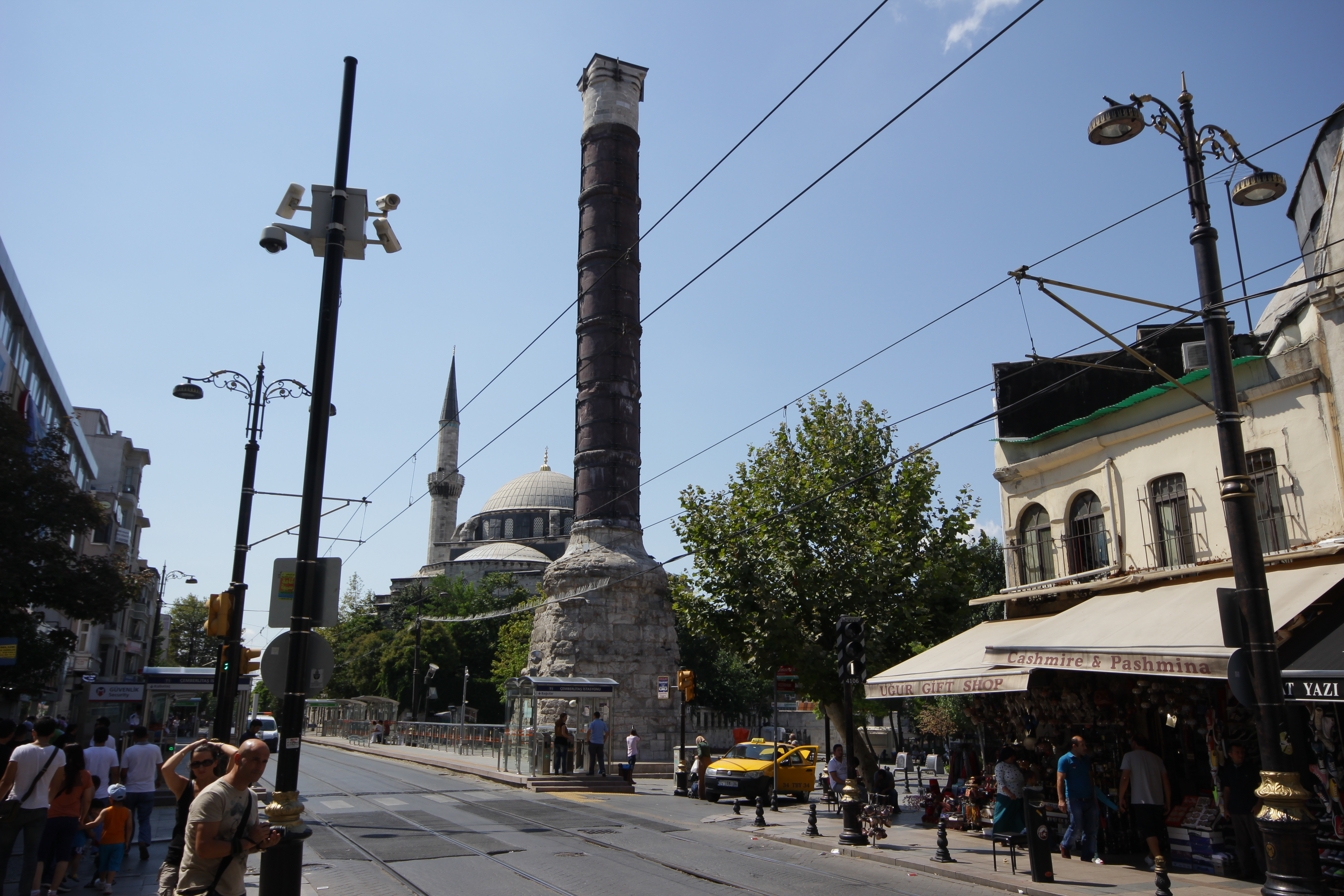
Divan Yolu street and the Column of Constantine

Residential buildings in Istanbul were divided into several categories: ev — small structures housing commoners and lower-ranking servants; konak — a wealthy citizen's mansion with a courtyard; yalı — a mansion on the Bosphorus shore, often with a private dock; and saray — a luxurious palace of a high-ranking official, surrounded by a garden and often with water access. The basements of all konaks and sarays were built from stone but had wooden frameworks. Many noble residences appeared unremarkable from the outside, as officials feared envy or anger from the sultan and his inner circle, but they boasted lavish interiors with ornate decorations. The ground floor was allocated for kitchens, servant and slave quarters, while the second floor, used by the owners, featured enclosed balconies.

At the beginning of the 17th century, at the initiative of Henry IV, the French began to increase their presence in Istanbul, gradually displacing the Venetians (who had previously established themselves in Tripoli, Aleppo, and Damascus, where French trade with the East was concentrated). The reign of Ahmed I continued the tradition of widespread corruption and official arbitrariness. In 1612, the Dutch received the privilege of the "right of the flag," particularly establishing themselves in İzmir (they also had significant interests in Galata, trading imported cloth and golden arslani, but in the capital, they preferred to conduct business through Greek and Armenian intermediaries or on behalf of Venetians). In 1614, by order of the sultan's wife Kösem Sultan, construction resumed on the New Mosque (Yeni Camii), which had previously been halted. Kösem wielded significant influence at her husband's court and even managed to marginalize Mahfiruz Hatice Sultan, Ahmed's first wife and the mother of his eldest son. Ahmed I died of typhus in November 1617 and was buried in the türbe at the Blue Mosque, alongside the remains of his mother, wife, and children.

== Mustafa I and Osman II's era ==
Following the death of Ahmed, one of the court factions placed his weak-willed younger brother Mustafa I on the throne, who had spent many years confined in the "Cage." In February 1618, Mustafa was deposed in favor of his 14-year-old nephew Osman II, the eldest son of Ahmed. The new sultan was a relatively independent ruler, but his defeat in the Battle of Khotyn significantly undermined his prestige. Returning to the capital, Osman planned a series of radical reforms, but in May 1622, rebellious Janissaries assassinated him in the Yedikule Fortress and reinstated Mustafa I. Osman was buried next to his father near the Blue Mosque. During the tenure of the French ambassador Philippe Harlay (1620–1631), Catholic missions in the empire received significant support, and the Capuchins even established a presence in Istanbul. After his second deposition in September 1623, Mustafa remained confined in the Topkapı Palace until his death. Following his death in January 1639, he was buried in a türbe in the courtyard of Hagia Sophia (his tomb was repurposed from a Byzantine-era Christian baptistery).

== Murad IV's era ==
In September 1623, a palace coup placed the young Murad IV on the throne, immediately elevating the influential faction of his mother Kösem Sultan and her loyal eunuchs. On behalf of the sultan, three of his brothers, who could have claimed the throne, were executed. In 1626, the authorities issued another decree mandating that houses in Istanbul and Galata be built from stone and clay, following the example of Aleppo and Damascus, but enforcement was lax. In 1627 (or, according to some sources, 1624), Greek monks established a printing press in Istanbul that published books in Greek. In May 1632, the sultan suppressed a rebellion by the Janissaries and Sipahis in the capital. Following this, the influence of the Valide Sultan began to wane, and Murad, through harsh repressions, restored order in his domains, enriching the sultan's treasury with the confiscated property of executed enemies. He even conducted a census of the population and an inventory of all buildings, corporations, and associations in the capital in 1637. Displeased with the growing influence of Armenians in internal and Mediterranean trade, Murad IV ordered the expulsion of all Armenians born in Kayseri and Eastern Anatolia from Istanbul; however, the decree was not enforced and had no consequences. In April 1635, the rebellious Emir of Lebanon Fakhr-al-Din II and his relatives were executed in Istanbul. Also in 1635, after the defeat of a Turkish squadron by the English, Ottoman authorities imposed a hefty fine on foreign residents in the capital, and the residences of Western ambassadors were searched and looted. The translator of the French embassy, who protested against the abuses, was impaled. In the same year, a small Yerevan Pavilion (Revan Köşk) was erected within the Topkapı Palace complex, named in honor of the Ottoman capture of Yerevan. In 1639, the Baghdad Pavilion (Bağdad Köşk) was built nearby to commemorate another Ottoman victory — the capture of Baghdad. In 1637, a major fire broke out in the Cibalî quarter, after which the sultan attempted to ban tobacco smoking and coffee consumption in Istanbul, with some mosques even delivering sermons against smoking. In June 1638, at the sultan's command, Patriarch Cyril Lucaris was strangled. He had opposed the influence of the Jesuits and aligned himself with Protestants, to whom he gifted the Codex Alexandrinus. During Murad's reign, the capital was home to prominent poets Nefʿî (executed by the sultan's order in 1635) and Yahya (who served as Sheikh-ul-Islam), as well as the writer-chronicler Koçibey. In February 1640, Murad IV died, and his younger brother Ibrahim I, released from the "Cage," ascended the throne.

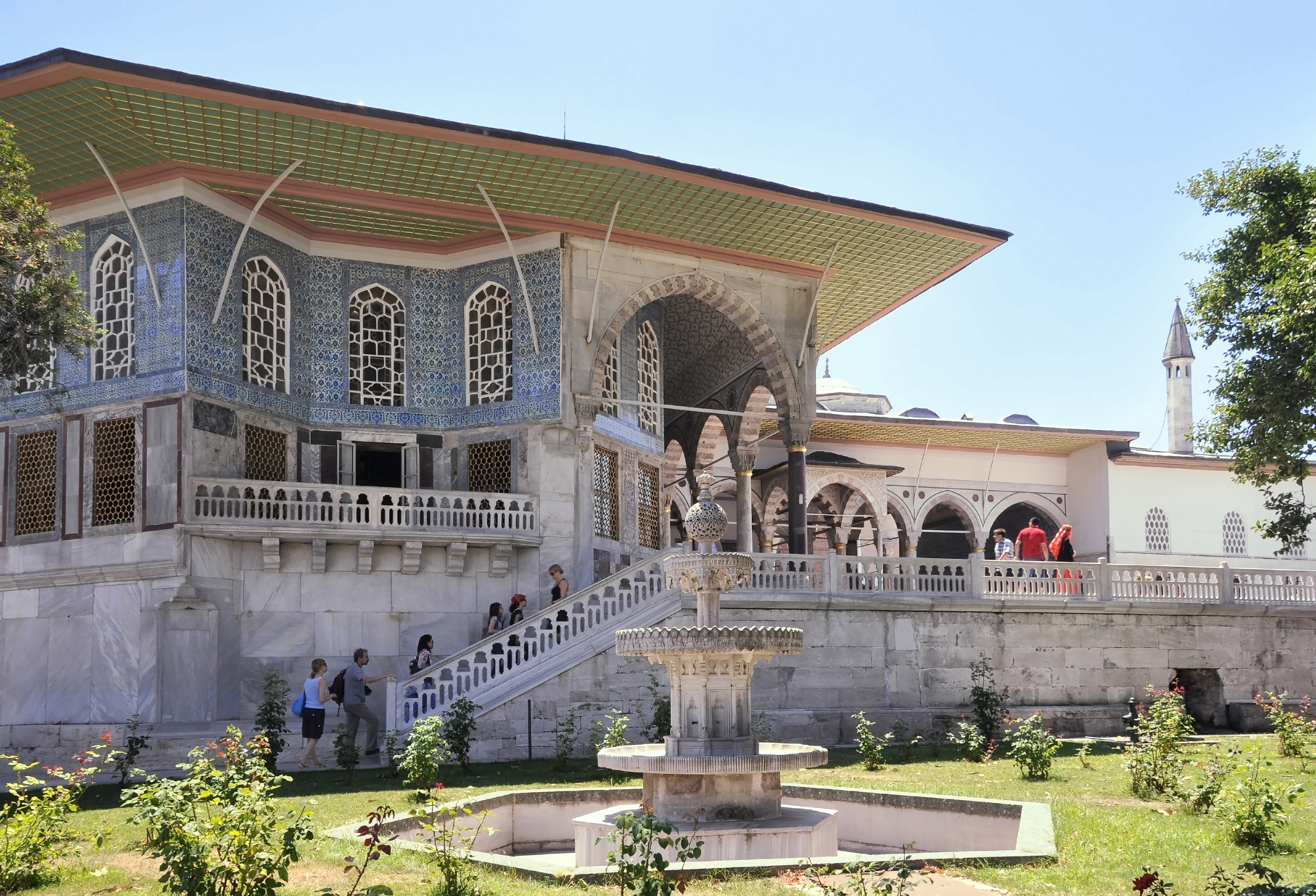
Revan Köşk

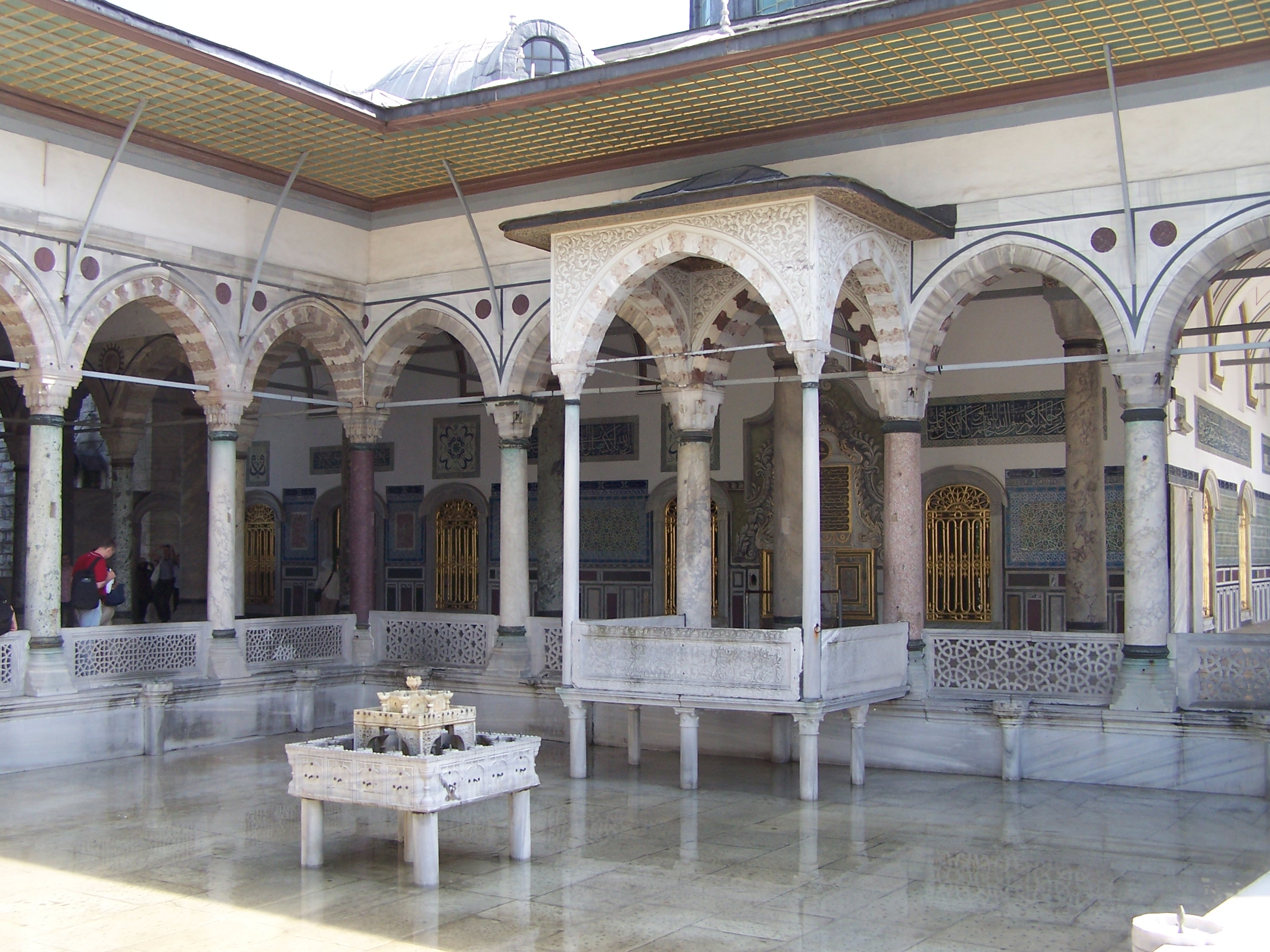
Revan Köşk

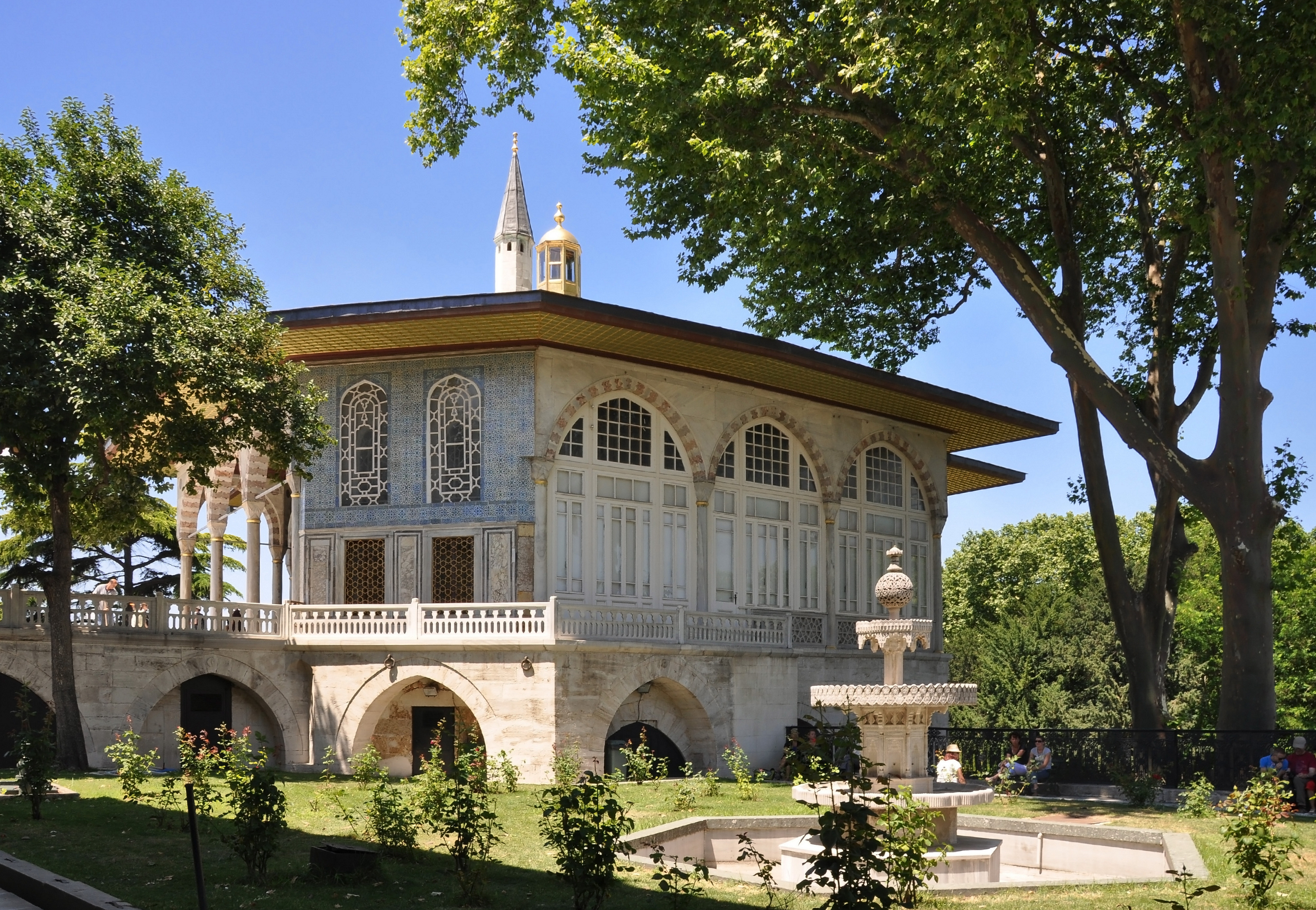
Bağdad Köşk

== Era of Ibrahim I ==
With the ascension of Ibrahim, the Kösem Sultan's faction returned to power, but her relationship with her son later deteriorated. The sultan depleted the treasury with extravagant expenditures on purchasing slaves, perfumes, and furs, causing their prices to skyrocket. Meanwhile, his mother, through her trusted kyzlar agha and frequently replaced viziers, managed all affairs of the Ottoman Empire. In 1642, the residence of the Armenian Patriarch was relocated from the Sulumonastır quarter to Kumkapı on the Marmara Sea coast, where a new Armenian district emerged. When, in October 1644, a squadron of Knights Hospitaller seized a wealthy Ottoman ship carrying high-ranking officials, the enraged sultan ordered the execution of all Christians in the Ottoman Empire. He later rescinded this order but initiated a protracted war with Venice. This caused significant harm to the large Venetian colony in Istanbul, which had previously surpassed other Europeans in trade volume (under the leadership of the bailo and the "Council of Twelve," it included dozens of merchants, some from ancient families residing in the East for generations, as well as diplomats, translators, secretaries, and priests). (Note: Additionally, several influential Jewish families settled in Istanbul, such as Franco, Yeshurun, and Naon, were under Venetian protection.) This also strained Franco-Ottoman relations. By 1646, all Western embassies had relocated to Galata and Pera, leaving almost no "Franks" in Istanbul proper (the residences of the Venetian bailo and the Genoese podestà had long been located in Galata and later Pera). Consequently, the decree of Suleiman the Magnificent, which prohibited foreigners from wearing Western clothing and required them to wear a Turkish kaftan over their attire, gradually fell into disuse. Moreover, interactions between "Franks" and Turks were reduced to a minimum, limited to dealings through Greek, Jewish, and Armenian intermediaries. The English ambassador received a salary from the Levant Company, while the French ambassador lived on deductions from the customs duties of Marseille (ambassadors paid bribes and fines to Turkish authorities for offenses committed by their compatriots). (Note: Only in 1691 did the French government assume all embassy expenses, significantly easing the burden on French merchants in Istanbul.) In August 1648, the Janissaries, supported by Muslim clergy and dervishes, overthrew the sultan. A few days later, he was strangled and buried in the türbe of Mustafa I in the courtyard of the Hagia Sophia Mosque.

== Mehmed IV's era ==
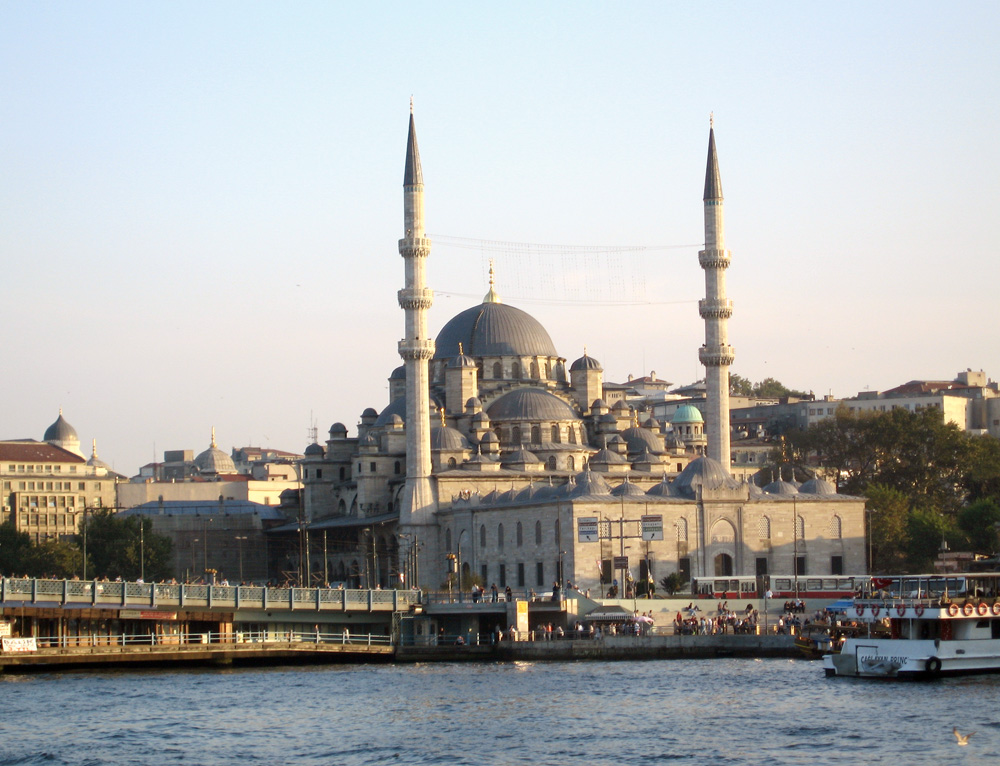
New Mosque

In 1648, the underage Mehmed IV ascended to the throne, replacing his father, who had been overthrown by the Janissaries, on the Ottoman throne. All power was concentrated in the hands of his mother Turhan Sultan and grandmother Kösem Sultan, who plunged the court into anarchy and a series of intrigues (in September 1651, the sultan's grandmother was strangled by eunuchs on the orders of Turhan Sultan). In August 1651, amid a wave of popular anger, the Grand Vizier Melik Ahmed Pasha was dismissed from his post (he had ordered the minting of a large number of low-quality piastres and akçe, forcing merchants and artisans to accept them at the rate of Venetian sequins and Ottoman gold coins). The further deterioration of the economic situation led to new revolts by the Janissaries and Istanbul guilds in 1655–1656. At the instigation of the influential valide sultan, the new Grand Vizier in September 1656 became Köprülü Mehmed Pasha — the founder of the Köprülü dynasty, which gradually replaced the so-called "Sultanate of Women".

Sultans always sought to please the Janissaries and win their favor with generous gifts, high salaries, and various entertainments. Since the Bayezid I's era, there was a custom (cülûs bahşişi), according to which sultans ascending the throne were required to reward the Janissaries with money (over time, it turned into a kind of tribute from rulers to the Janissary corps). By the mid-17th century, the Janissaries already played a significant role at the court, participated in almost all palace coups, actively removed unpopular officials, and also universally violated the original ban on marriage and entrepreneurial activity. They increasingly started families, replenishing the corps with their children, engaged in small trading operations and crafts, penetrating the trade and craft guilds of Istanbul. The lists of the Janissary corps included numerous "dead souls," whose salaries were appropriated by commanders, and the combat power of the sultan's guard sharply weakened. About a third of the Janissary corps was based in Istanbul, that is, from 10 to 15 thousand people. The Janissary barracks became the main hotbed of revolts that periodically shook the empire's capital (for example, during the reign of Mehmed IV alone, the Janissaries staged major revolts in 1651, May 1655, and March 1656), and the locations of the Janissary agha were sought by all opposing court factions.

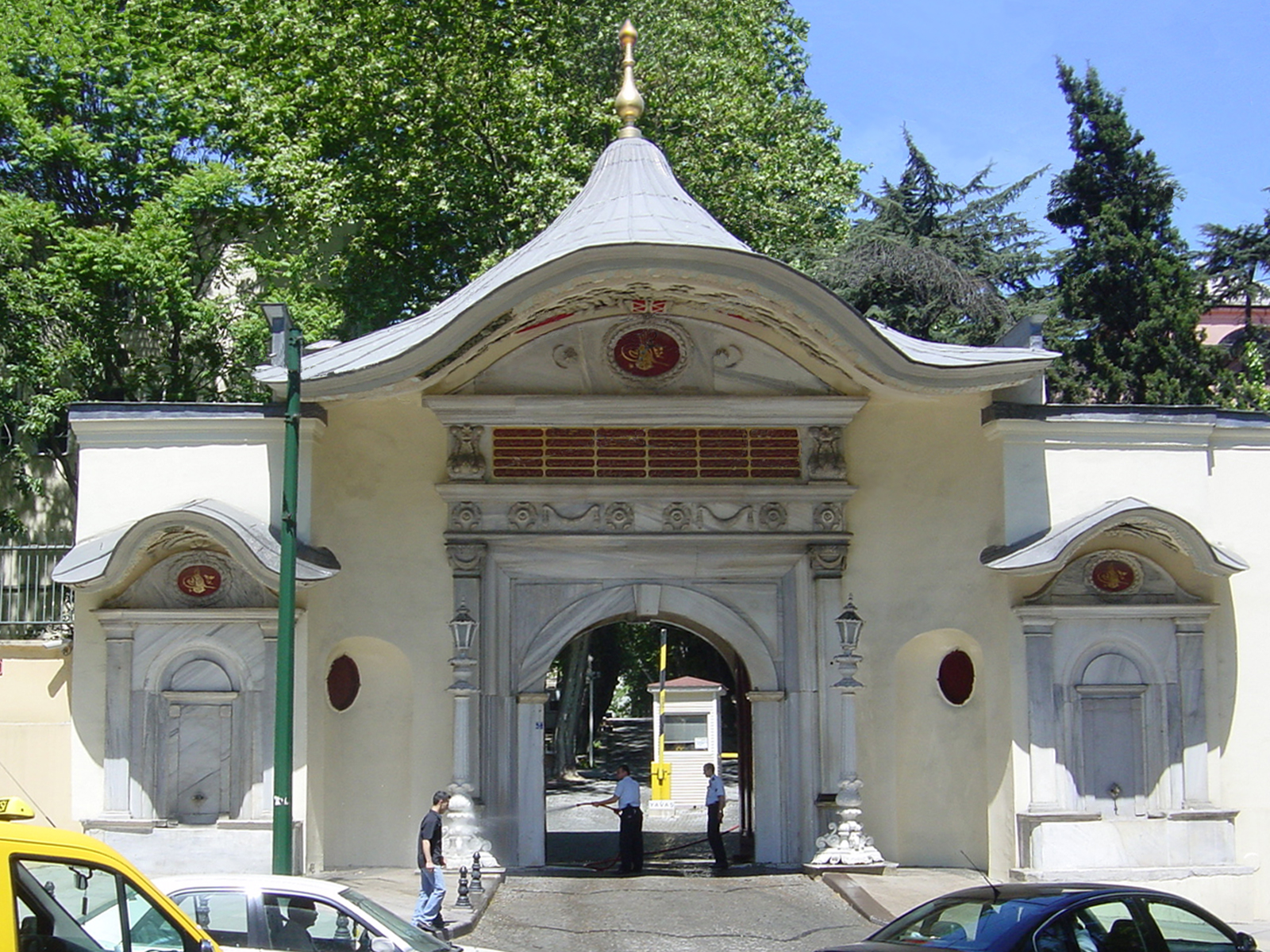
Gate to the Grand Vizier's palace

In 1654, one of the palaces built next to the Topkapı complex (the mansion of the former sadr-i aʿẓam Halil Pasha) became the permanent residence of the Grand Vizier. It was located opposite the Alay Köşkü pavilion, from whose balcony the sultan received parades of his army. The gates to this palace were called Pasha Kapısı (Pasha's Gate), then — Bâb-ı Âli (Sublime Porte), and from the last quarter of the 17th century, the entire government of the Ottoman Empire became known as the Sublime Porte (or Sublime Porte). However, the divan with the mandatory participation of the vizier continued to meet in the sultan's palace. In addition to the state treasury, the sultan's personal treasury was also kept in Topkapı, which, unlike the former, usually did not suffer from a lack of inflows. The sultan's personal funds were spent on state needs only in exceptional cases, formalized by the minister of finance (defterdar) in the form of debt obligations. The sultan's treasury was replenished at the expense of tribute from vassal Danubian principalities and Egypt, income from waqf lands and enterprises, offerings and gifts. The sultan appropriated the property of deceased military and civilian officials as the "rightful heir," and also widely practiced the system of executions of fallen officials with the confiscation of their wealth, introduced in the mid-17th century. Another way to replenish the treasury was the custom of marrying off sultan's daughters in infancy to wealthy officials, who were obliged to pay large sums for the maintenance of the "spouse".

All Istanbul's economically active population (merchants, intermediaries, moneylenders, artisans, small traders, and workers) was united in guilds (esnaf or ta'ifa). In fact, virtually the entire adult male population of the city was enrolled in one or another guild, with the exception of the military and those employed in court service. In the four capital districts (Istanbul, Eyüpsultan, Galata, and Üsküdar), there were 1,100 guilds, united into 57 associations (fütüvvet or futuwwa). According to the famous historian and geographer Evliya Çelebi, in the mid-17th century, there were more than 23,000 craft workshops in Istanbul, employing about 80,000 people, and more than 15,000 large traders (including their employees), who owned almost 3,200 shops, stalls, and warehouses. There were 65 corporations of small traders in the city, uniting street shopkeepers and peddlers, who controlled more than 14,000 trading points. In total, almost 50,000 Istanbul residents were employed in the sphere of small trade. According to various sources, the number of permanently operating shops of traders and artisans fluctuated in Istanbul at that time from 32 to 48 thousand (including counters and small shops of small and large craft workshops). Craft production was characterized by a deep division of labor, so the sewing industry of the capital was represented by 19 guild organizations, the leather industry by 35, the arms industry by 36, the construction industry by 44, bakers and confectioners were united in 29 corporations. Istanbul was especially famous for the products of jewelers, engravers, coiners, and gunsmiths.

Despite its impressive production potential, Istanbul was predominantly a consumer city, with almost all of its products going to the local market. Annually, 4 million sheep, 3 million lambs, and 200,000 heads of large cattle were driven to the capital; daily, Istanbul consumed 500,000 kg of wheat flour, a large amount of rice, dairy products, vegetables, and fruits. Grain reached the capital market from Thrace, the Asian coast of the Sea of Marmara, ports of the Aegean and Black Seas (especially from the Danubian principalities), rice from Egypt, sheep from the Balkans and Central Anatolia (especially from the slopes of the Taurus Mountains), poultry from eastern Thrace and the İzmir region, fish from villages along the Bosphorus and the Black Sea coast, yogurt from the environs of Istanbul, olives and olive oil from Central Anatolia, lemons from Chios and Cilicia, honey from Moldavia and Wallachia, salt from Egypt, Crimea, and Western Anatolia, coffee from Egypt and Yemen. Supplies of raw materials were also significant, especially leather and hides from Crimea, Bulgaria, and Moldavia. From Western Europe (France, England, Holland, Spain, Venice), fabrics, ready-made clothing, sugar, paper, hardware, copper, tin, lead, iron, dyes, glass and glassware, mirrors, medicines were imported; from India (mainly by the French and Dutch) pepper, cinnamon, ginger, and cloves.

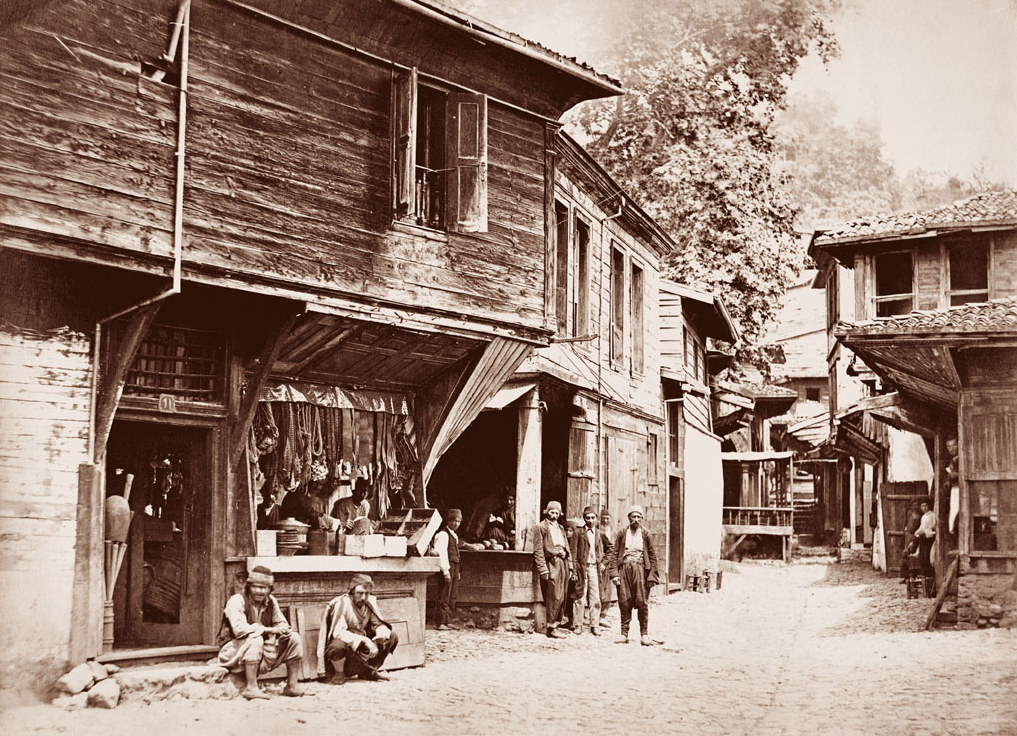
Typical Istanbul shop

The activities of Istanbul guilds were carefully regulated by the authorities and internal charters. For example, the number of persons entitled to open a workshop or shop in the city was strictly limited, and apprentices (kalfa) and trainees (çırak) were completely subordinate to the will of the master (usta). General issues of guild activities were handled by councils of elders elected by the masters, headed by foremen (kethüda) and their deputies (yiğitbaşı). They represented the interests of the guild in government institutions and resolved all internal disputes between guild members. In those guilds where "infidels" constituted the majority, the kethüda was elected from their number. The city authorities carefully controlled the activities of the guilds through qadis and special officials (muhtesibs and their assistants kologlans), who monitored the implementation of the charter and the distribution of necessary goods and products among the guilds (including imported raw materials). They also supervised production conditions and the quality of manufactured products, collected taxes, monitored the implementation of government decrees and pricing policies, and fought speculators. Despite strict control by the authorities, sometimes the dissatisfaction of Istanbul guilds spilled out onto the streets (for example, in August 1651 and in the winter of 1668–1669).

Every few years, each capital guild organized a festival that sometimes lasted a whole week (usually such festivals were held on the meadows of Kağıthane or Ağa Çayırı). At these peculiar fairs, craft and trade guilds demonstrated and sold their products, as well as treated the poor. In addition, the guilds participated in many official celebrations, for example, in parades on the occasion of the accession to the throne of a new sultan, the circumcision of a prince, or a military campaign of the army. Moreover, each guild built platforms on wheels, on which a particular workshop or shop was depicted. Rivalry flared up between the guilds as to who could most brightly and colorfully present their activities before the sultan and the courtiers (the winner received money or a valuable gift from the ruler). This rivalry was also intensified by the fact that the majority of Istanbul guilds were affiliated with one or another Sufi brotherhood (Bektashi, Mevlevi, or Melami), which were often in strained relations with each other. All Istanbul guilds had their patron saints, the guild leadership included sheikhs or dōāji (religious leaders), many large guilds had their own mosques or financed nearby ones. Ceremonies for admitting a new corporation member or inaugurating elected leaders into office were close to initiation rituals practiced in dervish brotherhoods. During guild festivals and celebrations, much attention and time was devoted to performing religious rites, although over time the sheikh of the guild or association turned into a nominal position (for example, he accompanied guild members during the Hajj).

Among Istanbul traders, there existed a peculiar hierarchy, at the top of which were large wholesale merchants specializing in imported goods (tüccar or bāzārgan). They were engaged in the procurement, transportation, and storage of grain, meat, coffee, tobacco, wine, fabrics, carpets, leather, hides and furs, incense, precious stones. For example, the cel eb-keşan guild, which owned huge herds of cattle, slaughterhouses, and a significant number of meat shops, enjoyed great influence. Patented intermediary-commissioners (dellāl), who received a certain percentage from each transaction, closely cooperated with wholesalers. Merchants from among Ottoman subjects (including Greeks, Armenians, and Jews) rarely went beyond the borders of the empire, preferring to buy goods from distant abroad from Persians, Arabs, Italians, and other "Franks." The lowest category included small shopkeepers and itinerant street traders (seyyār), whose only property was often a kiosk (koltuk), a tray for hawking, or a knapsack with a minimal assortment of goods. In descending order of the number of their members were traders in food products (flatbreads, buns, vegetables, fruits, meat and fish, yogurt, soft drinks), fabrics and ready-made clothing, medicines, potions and incense, shoes and coarse ceramics, as well as second-hand dealers (eskici).

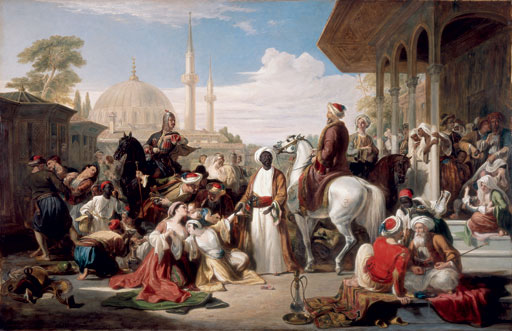
"Slave Market in Constantinople", painting by William Allan, 1838

Between wholesalers and small shopkeepers, there were several categories of traders, including numerous artisans selling their products directly in workshops, and owners of specialized shops in bedestens. As a rule, shops of artisans from one guild were located along one street or occupied one corner of the bazaar. In addition, there were government officials supplying the sultan's palace, army barracks and stables, imperial shipyards and workshops (for casting cannons, minting coins, producing gunpowder, cannonballs, masts, and sails) with everything necessary — food products, fodder, luxury items, clothing, slaves, firewood, and raw materials. In the center of Istanbul, in the area of the Grand Bazaar, there were state warehouses for wheat, barley, oats, vegetable oil, timber, salt, and gunpowder. A special category of traders was represented by Jewish merchants who raised and sold female slaves for wealthy townspeople. The slave market (Esir Pazarı) was located on a separate square near the Grand Bazaar, but only Muslims could buy slaves (from the mid-17th century, exceptions to the rule became possible for "infidels," and by the end of the 17th century, Christians and Jews could already legally acquire slaves for themselves, paying the corresponding tax to the treasury).

In addition to the slave market, there were other specialized markets — for the sale of horses, poultry, live and salted fish, books, spices, a "flea market," as well as weekly markets-fairs: Salı Pazarı ("Tuesday market") between Galata and Tophane, Çarşamba Pazarı ("Wednesday market") in Fethiye, Perşembe Pazarı ("Thursday market") in Karaköy. On Fridays, lively markets operated in the districts of Edirnekapı, Hoca Mustafa Paşa, Küçük Mustafa Paşa, Eyüpsultan, Kasımpaşa, and Üsküdar; on Saturdays — in the districts of Ali Paşa (near the Fatih Mosque) and Kulaksız (in the environs of Kasımpaşa); on Sundays — the Avrat Pazarı market; on Mondays — the market in the Ma'jūnju district. But the largest remained the Grand Bazaar (Büyük Çarşı) or Covered Bazaar (Kapalı Çarşı). Its heart was two ancient bedestens, around which numerous khans (a mixture of hotel, office, and warehouse), caravanserais, customs warehouses, shops, and workshops, as well as five mosques and seven fountains were located. The bazaar was a network of 67 streets intersecting at right angles, each of which bore the name of the guild that had settled on it (at some intersections, there were small squares where members of related guilds performed joint morning prayers). In total, 4,000 shops operated in the bazaar, of which about a thousand were in khans. In the old bedesten, silk, atlas, brocade, velvet, jewelry, precious stones, carpets, furs, and porcelain were sold; in the new one — expensive fabrics embroidered with gold and silver threads, silk, and angora. All 18 gates of the Grand Bazaar were closed in the evening, after which the trading complex remained under the supervision of night watchmen appointed by the guilds.

Among the capital's artisans, the most numerous were corporations of millers, tailors, tanners, babouche makers (slippers without backs and heels), carpenters, joiners, chandlers, and saddlers (each numbering more than 3,000 people). There were also large state industrial enterprises, primarily the naval arsenal in the Kasımpaşa quarter and the artillery arsenal in Tophane, as well as several arms (tüfenkhane) and gunpowder (baruthane) factories, two large ateliers that sewed uniforms for the Janissary corps, army bakeries, workshops for producing tallow candles, hardtack, and boza (more than 7,000 people worked in them). Specialized workshops for the production of furniture, iznik tiles, glass and bronze items, a huge art workshop, as well as sewing workshops that made dolamans, robes, and turbans for officials and servants worked for the needs of the sultan's palace and numerous courtiers. An important place was occupied by mints (near the Bayezid Mosque and in the palace), where many "infidels," especially Jews, worked. In total, more than 10,000 people worked at 31 state enterprises in Istanbul.

Military and civil ranks of the Ottoman Empire
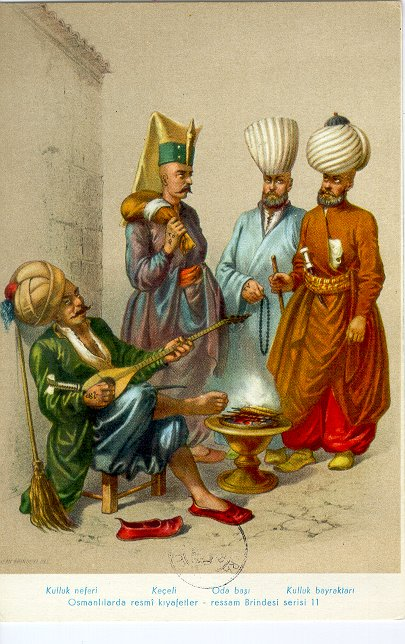
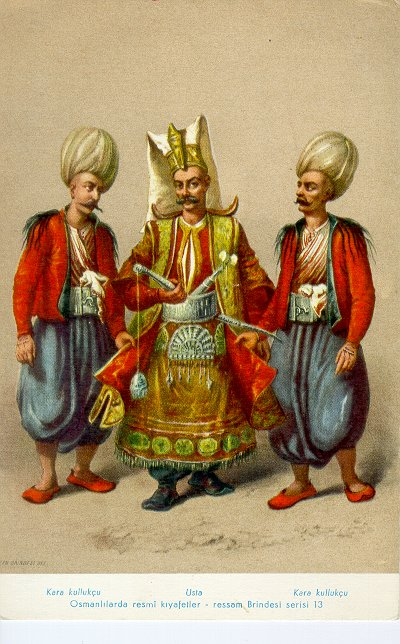
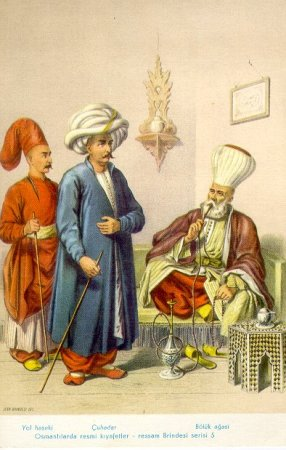
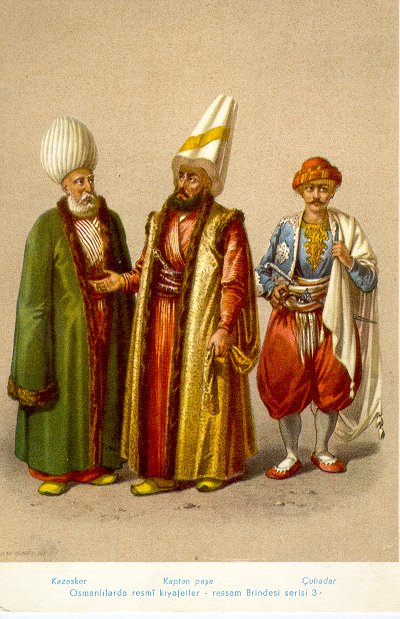
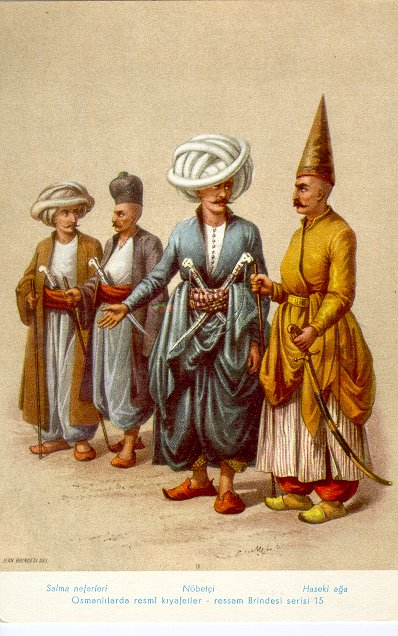

About 40,000 people belonged to categories of people earning their living by intellectual labor or in the entertainment sphere. The Şeyhülislam headed a numerous hierarchy of "people of faith," who were divided into two categories — cult servants and madrasa teachers (to the latter were also attached the ulama). Intellectual workers included writers and poets, manuscript traders (sahhaf), scribes (yazıcı), compilers of complaints and petitions (arzuhalcı), doctors, surgeons, oculists, and pharmacists (among doctors there were especially many Greeks and Jews). About 15,000 people were magicians, puppeteers, artists of Karagöz shadow theater and street orta oyunu theater, acrobats, tightrope walkers, bear trainers and nightingale trainers, storytellers of comedic, historical, and fairy tales (meddah), folk poets (aşık or saz şairleri), jesters, and other street performers (among them there were many Arabs, Persians, Indians, Gypsies, Armenians, and Greeks). A higher status was held by 6,000 musicians, divided into sultan's or court (mehtar) and free (71 of their corporations were subordinate to one chief — sazendebaşı). A separate category was represented by workers in hamams (bath attendants, masseurs, barbers, and other auxiliary personnel), of which there were more than 150 in mid-17th century Istanbul (including about 60 public baths in Istanbul, about 50 in the suburbs, the rest — private baths in sultan's palaces and mansions of the nobility), as well as independent barbers (sünnetçi), who, in addition to haircutting and shaving, practiced circumcision operations.

Among other common professions in Istanbul were watersellers (saka), gardeners, and boatmen, united in their guilds, as well as domestic servants, including permanent and casual. There were few beggars in the Ottoman capital asking for alms on the street. All the destitute were supported by imarets, which were opened at every major mosque. In addition, widows, orphans, ruined artisans and traders, cripples, or settlers received help from both neighbors and guild organizations, which had special mutual aid funds for these purposes. Part of the poor worked on public works for laying roads or digging drains, organized by the authorities.

An important role was played by guilds of tavern and inn owners (there were more than a thousand such establishments in Istanbul, employing about 6,000 people). Taverns were owned mainly by "infidels," there were none in Muslim quarters and near mosques. The largest number of drinking establishments was located in Samatya, Kumkapı, Balıkpazarı, Unkapanı, Cibali, Ayakapı, Fener, Balat, Hasköy, Galata, and villages along the Bosphorus (that is, in areas mainly inhabited by Christians and Jews). Kabaks and taverns were grouped near docks, but among their clients were not only sailors, loaders, and traders, but also Janissaries, other soldiers, beggars, and prostitutes. Public houses also operated, the staff of which was recruited mainly from "infidels" — Greek women, Armenian women, Jewish women, women from the Caucasus and Europe (but there were also Syrian women, Persian women, and even Turkish women). In addition to taverns and public houses, some prostitutes worked under the guise of sellers of kaymak or launderers. Districts with the worst reputation in terms of depraved pleasures were considered Galata, Tophane, and Eyüpsultan (the latter attracted prostitutes by the large number of pilgrims).

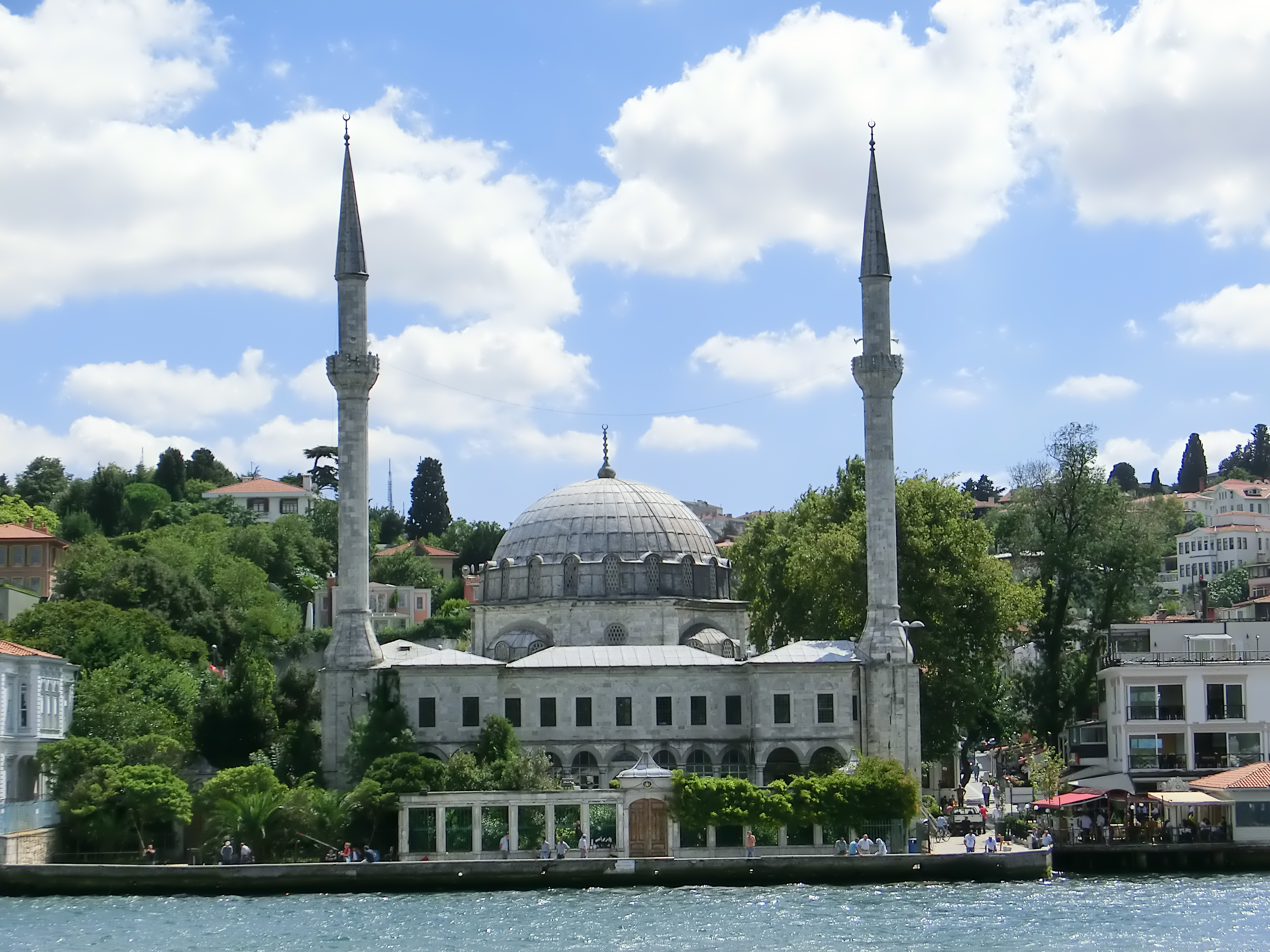
Üsküdar

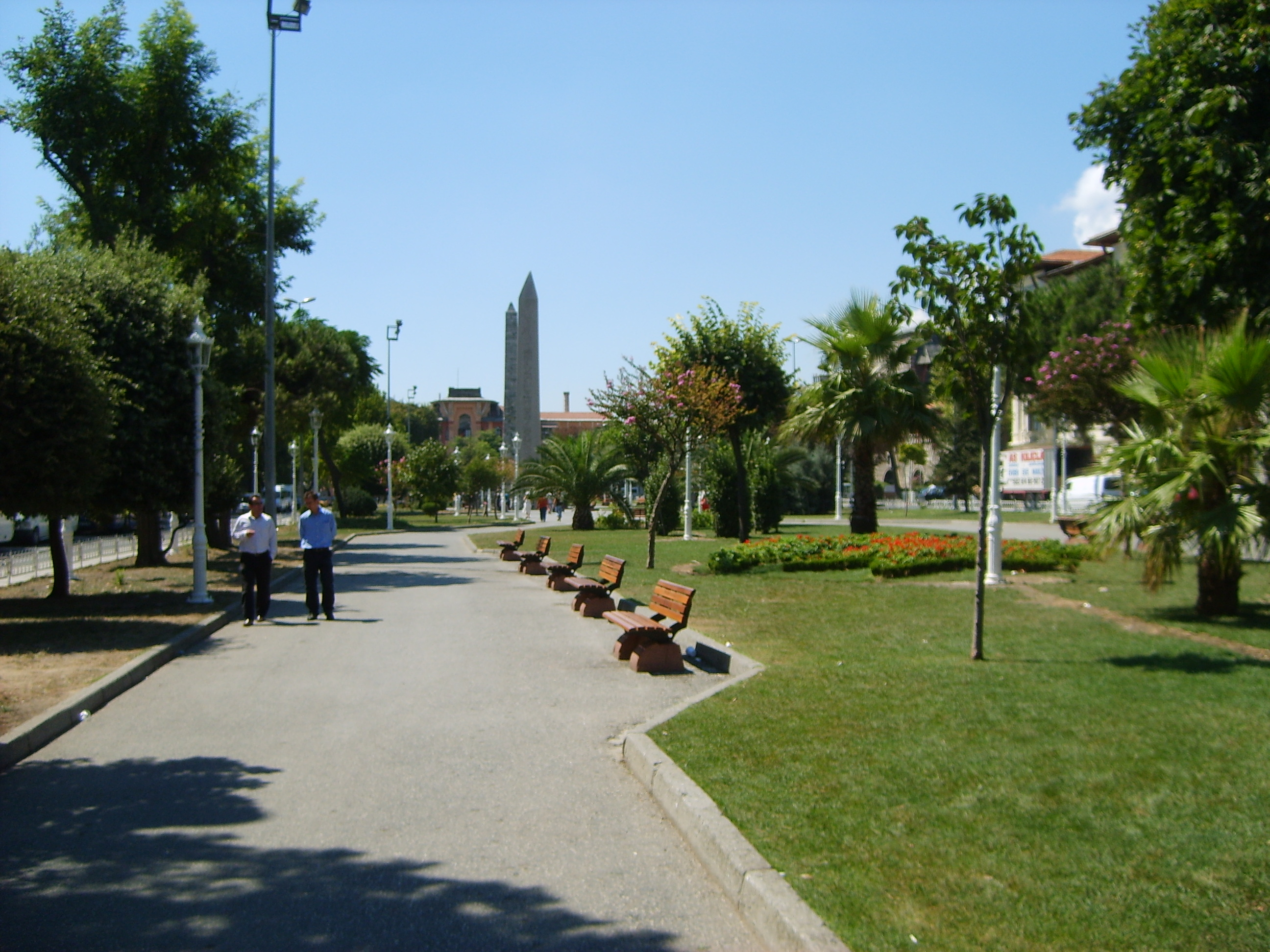
At Meydanı

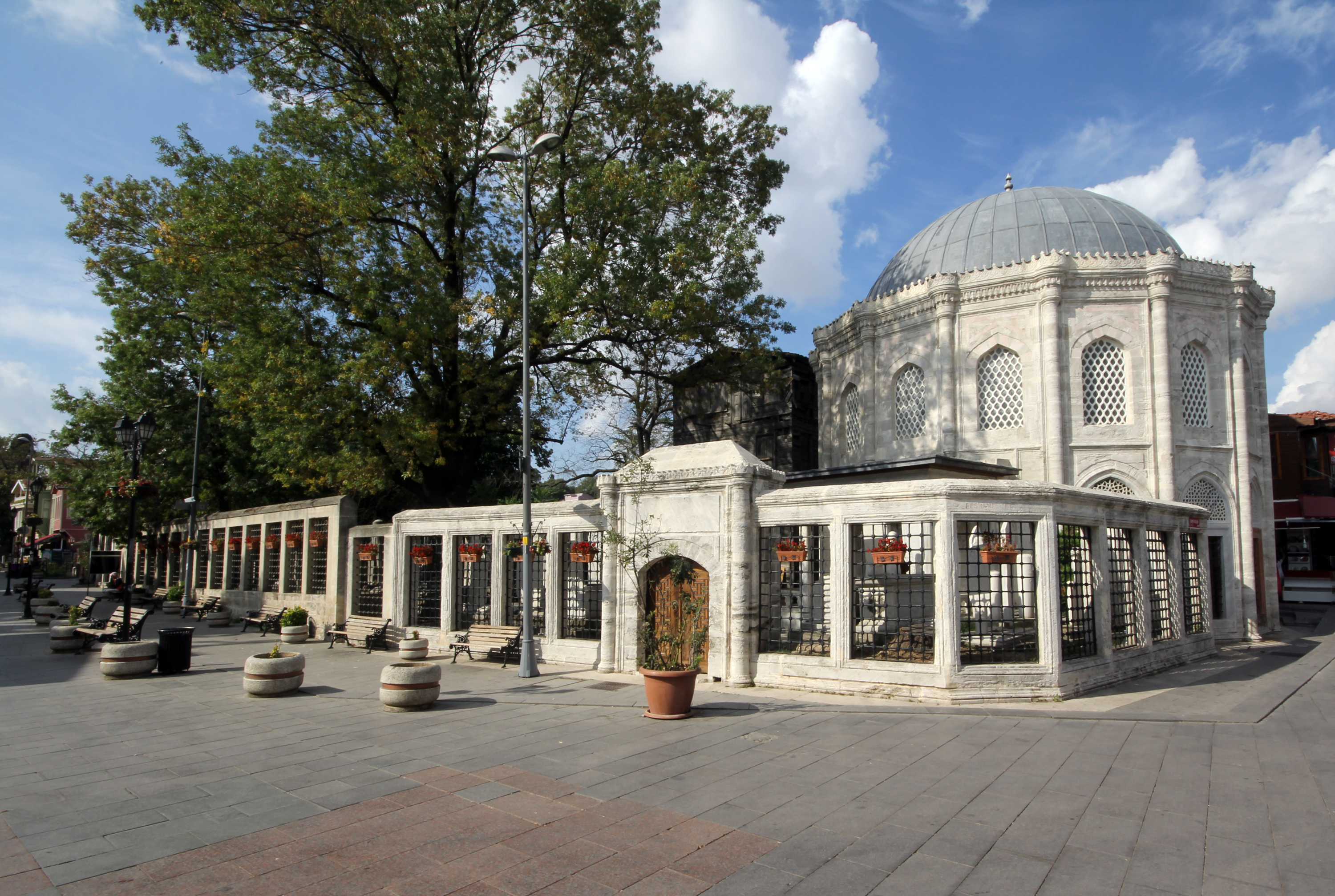
Eyüpsultan

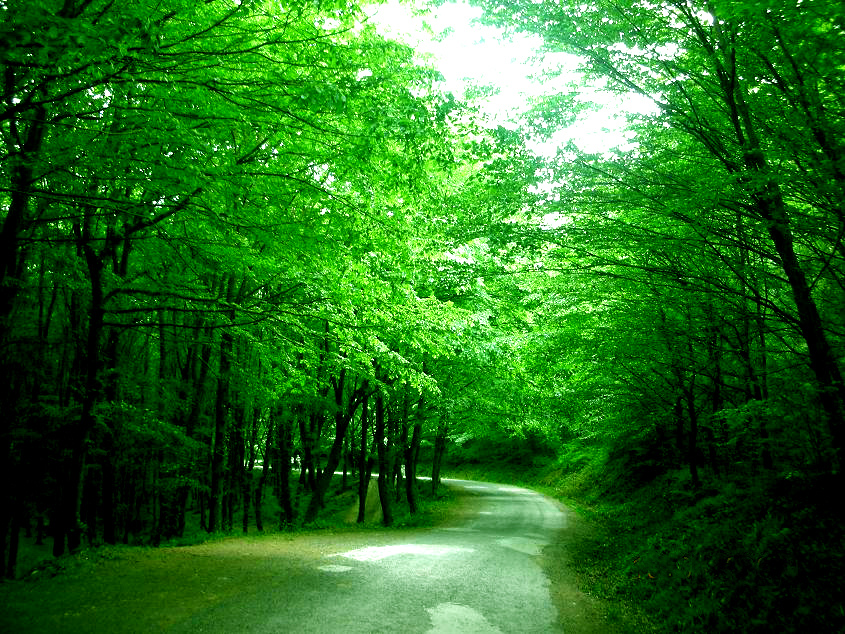
Belgrade Forest

According to Evliya Çelebi's data, the favorite places of rest and entertainment for Istanbul residents were the At Meydanı square, Baruthane near the Golden Horn, the Bayezid square at the eponymous mosque, the Vefa square not far from the Fatih Mosque, Ağa Çayırı ("Aga's Meadow") near the Silivri Gate, Yeni Bahçe ("New Garden") at the Topkapı Gate, Kadırga Limanı on the shores of the Sea of Marmara, Langa (a popular place for sea bathing), squares in the Eminönü, Samatya, and Davud Paşa districts, as well as the esplanades in front of the mosques of Selim, Suleiman, Hagia Sophia, Şehzade, and Fatih. Outside the city walls, townspeople rested in Kağıthane on the shores of the Golden Horn ("Sweet Waters of Europe," so named because of the water source), on the plain of Suleiman, the meadows of Topçular and Otakçılar, in the gardens of the dervish monastery in Yedikule and the gardens of Eyüpsultan. On the northern shore of the Golden Horn, Istanbulites were attracted by the Okmeydanı hill, where the military trained in archery at targets, the environs of the Piyale Pasha Mosque in the depths of the Kasımpaşa valley, and the heights of Pera, from which a beautiful view of the Golden Horn, the Bosphorus, and the Sea of Marmara opened. On weekends and holidays, townspeople hired a boat and went to quiet places along the European shore of the Bosphorus — villages of Beşiktaş, İstinye, Yeniköy, and Tarabya, to the Belgrade Forest and to the Kaşthane spring. On the Asian shore, Istanbulites visited the Üsküdar cemetery, the healing spring at Çamlıca Hill, the "Sweet Waters of Asia" near the Anadoluhisarı fortress, and numerous mansions (yalı), built in the greenery of gardens right by the water and equipped with piers (kaikhanes) for boats and pleasure boats.

The Ottoman authorities strictly prohibited printing houses operating in Istanbul from printing books in Turkish, Arabic, or Persian languages, and also did not allow the import of books in Arabic printed in Europe. Muslim works published by typography were declared "impure" and subject to destruction. Mehmed IV monitored compliance with this law so strictly that he ordered the drowning of all copies of the Quran that one Englishman had brought to Istanbul. In addition, Mehmed ordered the Arabic font sent as a gift to the sultan from Venice to be thrown into the water. The educated stratum of capital Turks used manuscripts and actively followed the Muslim custom of creating libraries of handwritten books (there were numerous private collections in Istanbul, storing tens of thousands of manuscripts in Arabic, Persian, and Turkish). During the reign of Mehmed IV, the historian and encyclopedic writer Kâtip Çelebi, the historian and geographer Evliya Çelebi, the historian Hezarfen, who maintained relations with the French orientalist and translator Antoine Galland, and Ibrahim Peçevi, poet Yusuf Nabi, as well as many other scholars and figures of art worked in Istanbul.

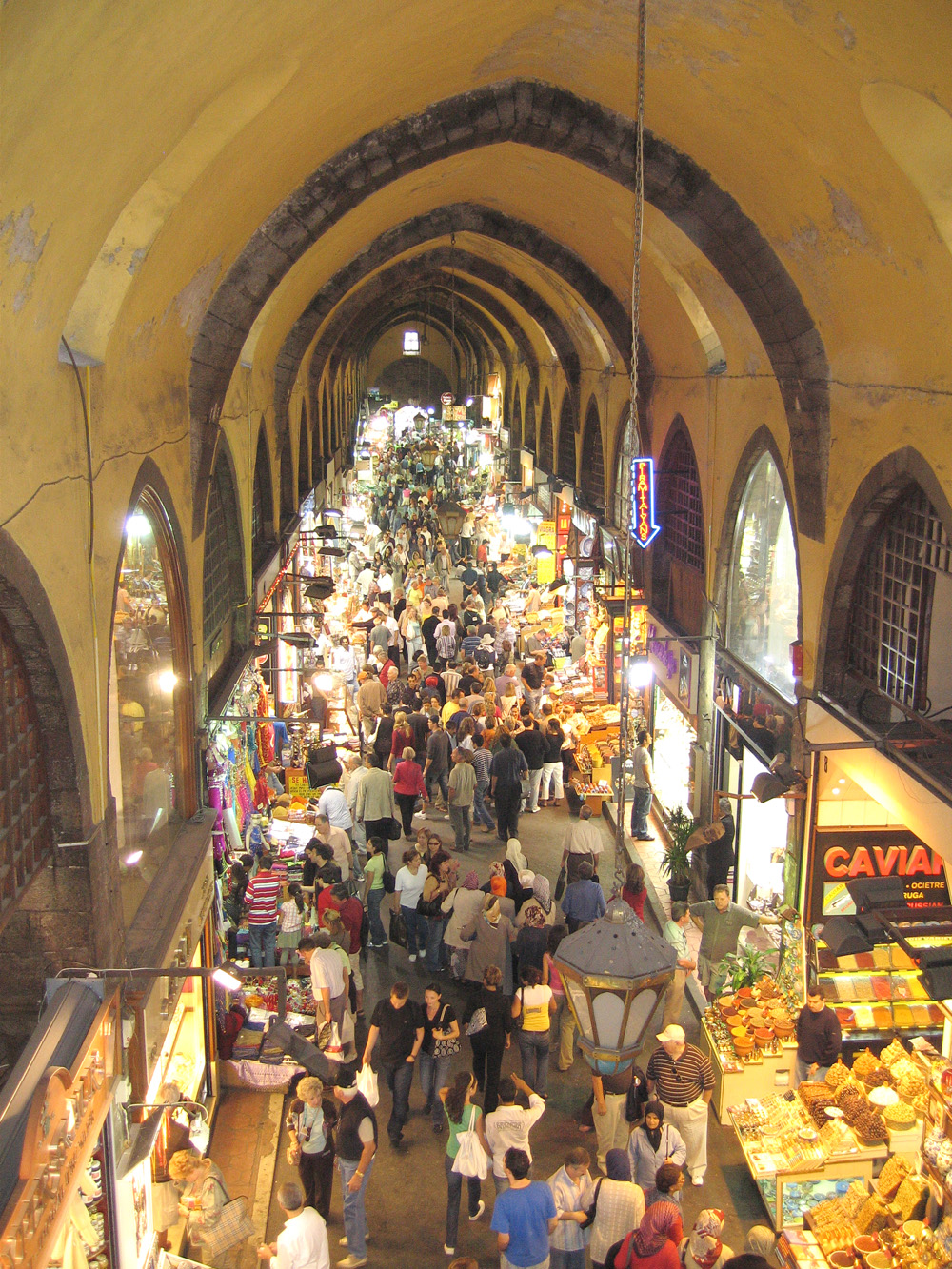
Egyptian Bazaar

In 1660, the large Egyptian Bazaar was completed, specializing in the sale of spices and condiments (income from this market went to the completion and then maintenance of the neighboring New Mosque). In the same 1660, a grandiose fire broke out in Istanbul, destroying many houses, mosques, churches, and other buildings, including a number of wooden buildings in the Topkapı Palace. After this, court buildings were usually built of stone, as, for example, the sultan's harem and a number of service premises of the Topkapı complex, built in the 1660s (in 1665, another fire again devastated a number of premises of the sultan's palace, the restoration of which took three years). In general, frequent fires were a real disaster for the predominantly wooden Istanbul. From 1633 to 1698 alone, fire destroyed entire city quarters 21 times, along with trading rows, craft workshops, warehouses, and granaries, thus inflicting enormous damage on the capital's economy.

In September 1661, after a serious illness, Grand Vizier Köprülü Mehmed Pasha died, and his place was taken by his son Fazıl Ahmed Pasha. He began the struggle against the Melami order, which had strengthened its positions, ordering the execution of a number of sheikhs and a large number of brotherhood members, after which it went underground. In 1665, thanks to the efforts of Turhan Sultan, the construction of the New Mosque was completed (the complex also included a madrasa, mektep, hospital, baths, and the residence of the valide sultan). In February 1666, the Jewish false messiah Shabbatai Tzvi arrived in Istanbul, causing unrest in the Jewish community. On the orders of the vizier, he was imprisoned (later transferred to the Abydos castle), but enthusiastic admirers of Shabbatai began to flock to Istanbul. In August, the false messiah was invited to the sultan's palace, where he converted to Islam, after which he went as a gatekeeper to Adrianople. In 1670, the sultan issued a decree prohibiting the sale of wine in Istanbul and ordering the closure of all drinking establishments, but this ban was not strictly enforced. Mehmed IV also lifted the ban on smoking tobacco introduced by his predecessor Murad IV and introduced a state monopoly on tobacco trade, which greatly enriched the Ottoman treasury. In June 1674, on the territory of the At Meydanı square, a grandiose festival took place dedicated to the circumcision of the sultan's sons Mustafa and Ahmed. In November 1676, Grand Vizier Fazıl Ahmed Pasha died, who was buried in his father's türbe. Mehmed IV appointed Kara Mustafa Pasha — a ward of the Köprülü family — as the new Grand Vizier. In 1681, after an incident provoked by Admiral Abraham Duquesne on Chios (when the French squadron shelled the city and the Turkish garrison), Franco-Ottoman relations sharply deteriorated, and the entire French colony in Istanbul was under threat of repression, but Ambassador Guillergay managed to appease the necessary officials with expensive gifts. In the spring of 1683, six major fires broke out in the capital within two months, destroying more than 3,000 residential houses and trading shops.

In the second half of the 17th century, a large wave of Ashkenazim settled in Istanbul, fleeing pogroms in Poland and Ukraine. In turn, a series of fires forced the "Romaniotes" to leave the Jewish quarter of Balıkpazarı. More and more often, wealthy representatives of Istanbul minorities (Christians and Jews) resorted to the help and protection of influential Ottoman officials (for bribes) and foreign ambassadors. In July 1683, the former valide sultan Turhan Sultan died, buried in the türbe near the New Mosque. In December 1683, after the extremely unsuccessful Battle of Vienna, the Janissary agha, on the sultan's orders, strangled Grand Vizier Kara Mustafa Pasha, who had fled to Belgrade. In 1684, another war with Venice began, which forced the Istanbul Venetians to significantly curtail maritime trade and conduct business through intermediaries — French, English, and Ottoman Jews. In September 1685, the French founded the Mediterranean Trading Company, based in Marseille and Istanbul (the brothers Fabre had the greatest influence in it). In the fall of 1687, as a result of another Janissary revolt, organized by the Köprülü court faction (in particular, the military governor of Istanbul Fazıl Mustafa Pasha), Mehmed IV was deposed, and the rebels even partially plundered the sultan's palace. The soldiers' outrages led to the capital's population being forced to take up arms to protect their homes from marauders. The younger brother of the deposed ruler, Suleiman II, ascended the throne, and Mehmed himself died in captivity in January 1693 (buried in the large türbe next to the New Mosque).

== Suleiman II's era ==
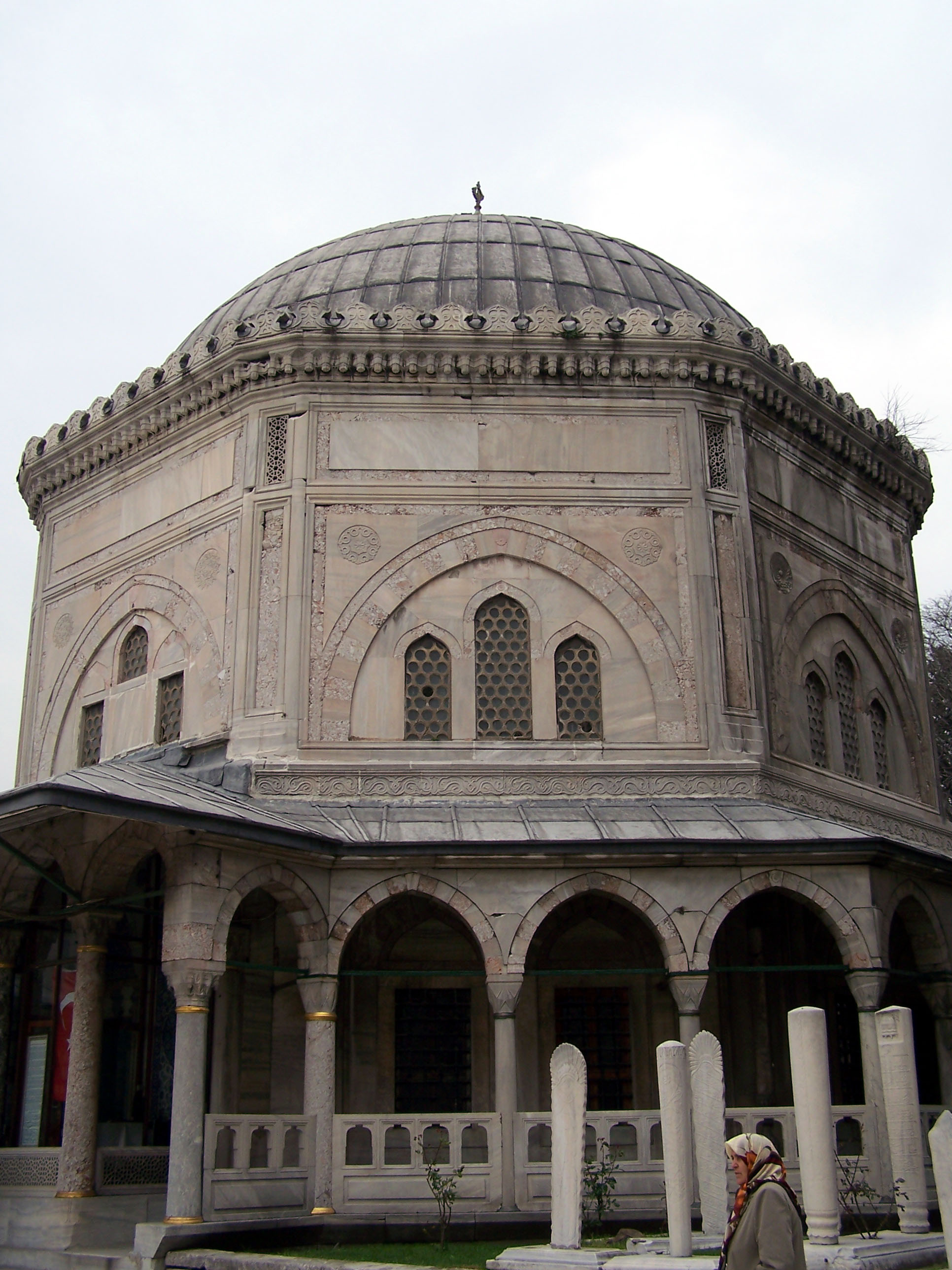
Tomb of Suleiman the Magnificent

Before ascending to the throne, Suleiman II spent about forty years in the "Cage" and was not distinguished by robust health. All affairs of the empire were managed by the Grand Vizier Köprülüzade Fazıl Mustafa Pasha, appointed to his post in November 1689. During the reign of Suleiman II, an active struggle was waged against corruption and luxury among the capital's officials, the army was strengthened, heavy taxes were reduced, and the position of Christians was eased. But after prolonged wars with Venice and the defeat at Vienna, the economy of the Ottoman Empire was in a severe state, which allowed Western European merchants to further strengthen their positions. Suleiman II died in June 1691 and was buried in the tomb of Suleiman the Magnificent.

== Ahmed II's era ==
After the death of Suleiman II, the Ottoman throne was ascended by the younger brother of the deceased ruler, Ahmed II, with the support of Fazıl Mustafa Pasha, who had also spent about forty years in the "Cage". Ahmed II died in February 1695 and was buried in the tomb of Suleiman the Magnificent. His son Mustafa II, who grew up at the court in Edirne, became the new sultan.

By the end of the 17th century, several main trade and craft zones had formed in Istanbul. First of all, the "lower town" of Galata stood out, stretching along the embankment and piers to the Kasımpaşa arsenal. Also, lively trade was carried out on the southern shore of the Golden Horn in the Eminönü quarter, along the piers of the old port (on the site of the former Venetian, Amalfi, and Pisan quarters). In the heart of Istanbul were located large bedestens, surrounded by trading rows, numerous workshops and caravanserais, spreading to the Bayezid quarter. From the Grand Bazaar, three trading streets diverged, laid along the old Byzantine highways. One descended through the Mehmetpaşa trading quarter to the piers and warehouses on the shore of the Golden Horn; another went through the Seracihane and Şehzadebaşı quarters to the Şehzade Mosque; the third stretched to the Aksaray quarter. Markets and fair-type trading rows (often trade was conducted directly from carts, and among the goods, food products predominated) for local residents were located in Eyüpsultan, Yedikule, and Üsküdar (in total, 15 district markets served Istanbul).

Dense residential areas formed along the southern shore of the Golden Horn, along the axial highways Edirne Gate — Hagia Sophia and Bayezid Mosque — Aksaray quarter, in the Eyüpsultan suburb, on the slopes of Galata, in the environs of the Tophane and Kasımpaşa arsenals, as well as in the seaside suburbs of Kumkapı, Samatya, and Yedikule. At the same time, in late 17th-century Istanbul, there were many vacant lots, fruit gardens, parks, and ornamental gardens at wealthy palaces and villas, as well as extensive grounds around numerous mosques and madrasas. Mansions of the nobility were concentrated in two prestigious districts: along Divan Yolu Street, which connected the squares of the Hagia Sophia and Bayezid mosques, and in the triangle between the Süleymaniye Mosque, the Şehzade Mosque, and the Vefa square (to a lesser extent, wealthy villas and mansions were located on the shores of the Sea of Marmara in the Ahırkapı quarter and along the shores of the Bosphorus). Districts of commoners with increased building density covered the territories between the line Edirne Gate — Bayezid Mosque and the shore of the Golden Horn, between the Blue Mosque and the Aksaray — Yedikule zone, between Samatya and Yedikule. Dense building and dilapidation of housing contributed to large-scale fires, from which Christians and Jews suffered especially, since according to an old law issued by Mehmed the Conqueror, a burned church or synagogue could no longer be restored.

By the end of the 17th century, Jews constituted the majority in a number of quarters in Balat, Ayazma Kapı, Ayvansaray, Cibali, and Tekfur Saray, their large communities lived in Hasköy, Kasımpaşa, Galata, and Mumhane. In addition, Jews were found in Beşiktaş, Ortaköy, Kuzguncuk, and Üsküdar. Each Jewish community had its own rabbi and council for internal self-government (hashgaha), which were accountable to the chief rabbi of Istanbul. The top of the community consisted of wealthy moneylenders and negotiators who mediated between the Ottoman authorities and the "Franks," as well as court physicians (hekimbaşı), pharmacists, appraisers, translators, owners of textile and metalworking workshops. Armenians lived in their quarters in Samatya, Sulu Manastır, Yedikule, Kumkapı, Balat, Topkapı, Hasköy, Kasımpaşa, Galata, Beşiktaş, Ortaköy, Kurucesme, and Üsküdar. Among them there were many small traders and artisans (they made and sold basturma, buns, flatbreads, and rakı), as well as donkey drivers, servants, and porters.

Albanians were famous as road pavers and diggers who dug wells; many of them worked as small itinerant traders and palace servants. Arabs (Egyptians, Syrians, and natives of Baghdad) specialized in construction professions (there were especially many among stonemasons), and also engaged in pottery (produced and sold faience tiles and dishes). Gypsies living in Balat were engaged in blacksmithing and were famous as fortune-tellers and itinerant artists (singers, dancers, and bear trainers), Serbs and Wallachians traded cheeses, smoked meat, vegetables, and fruits, Persians specialized in trading imported goods from the East, among the Galata "Franks" there were many healers, surgeons, and pharmacists.

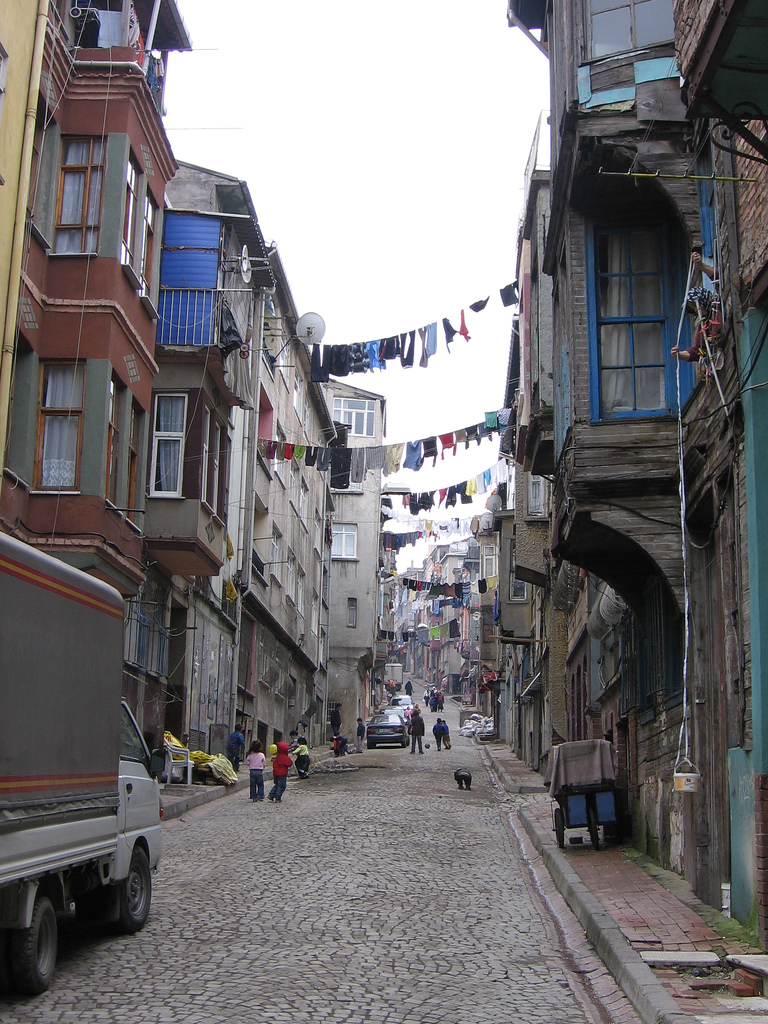
Balat

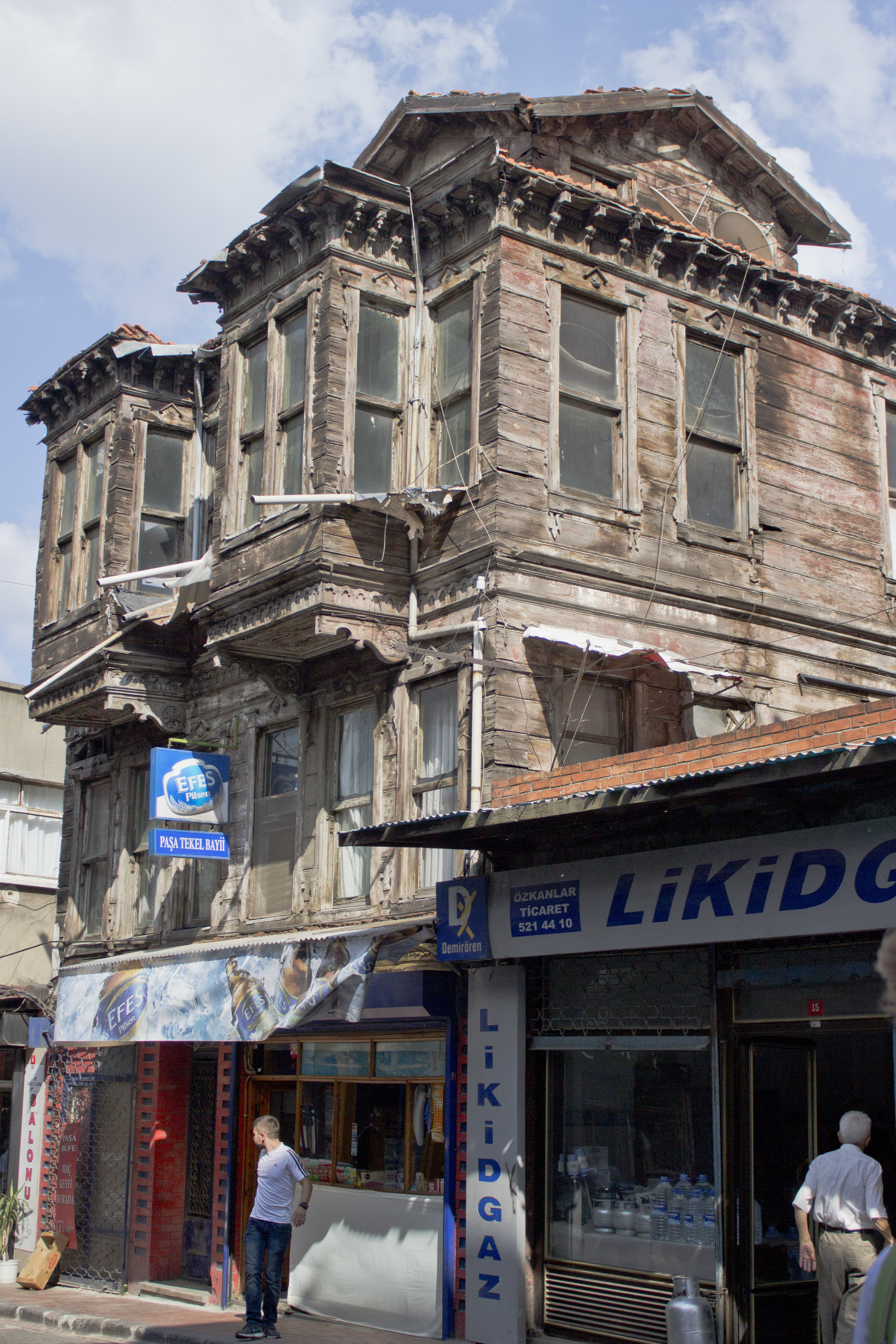
Fatih

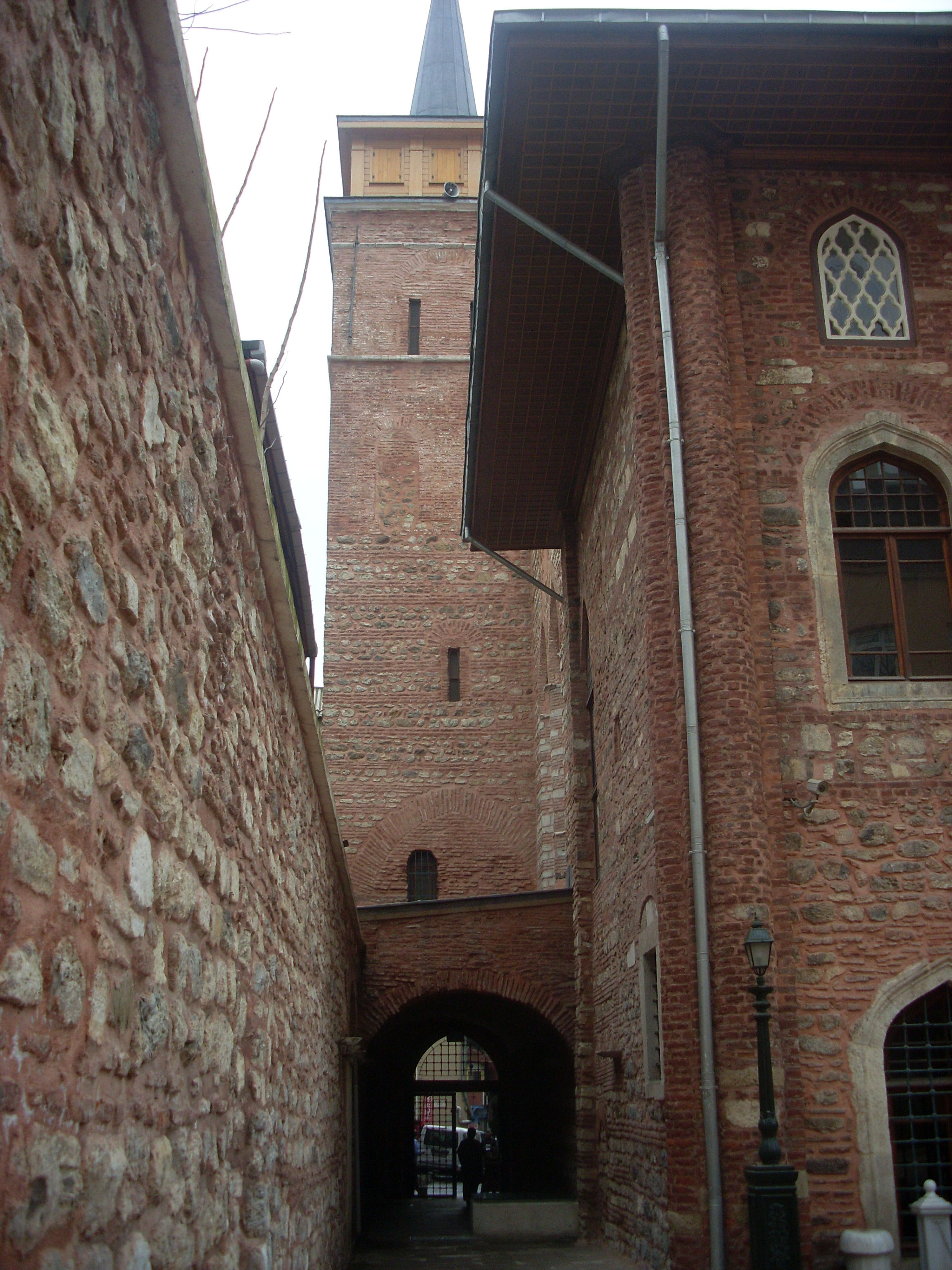
Karaköy

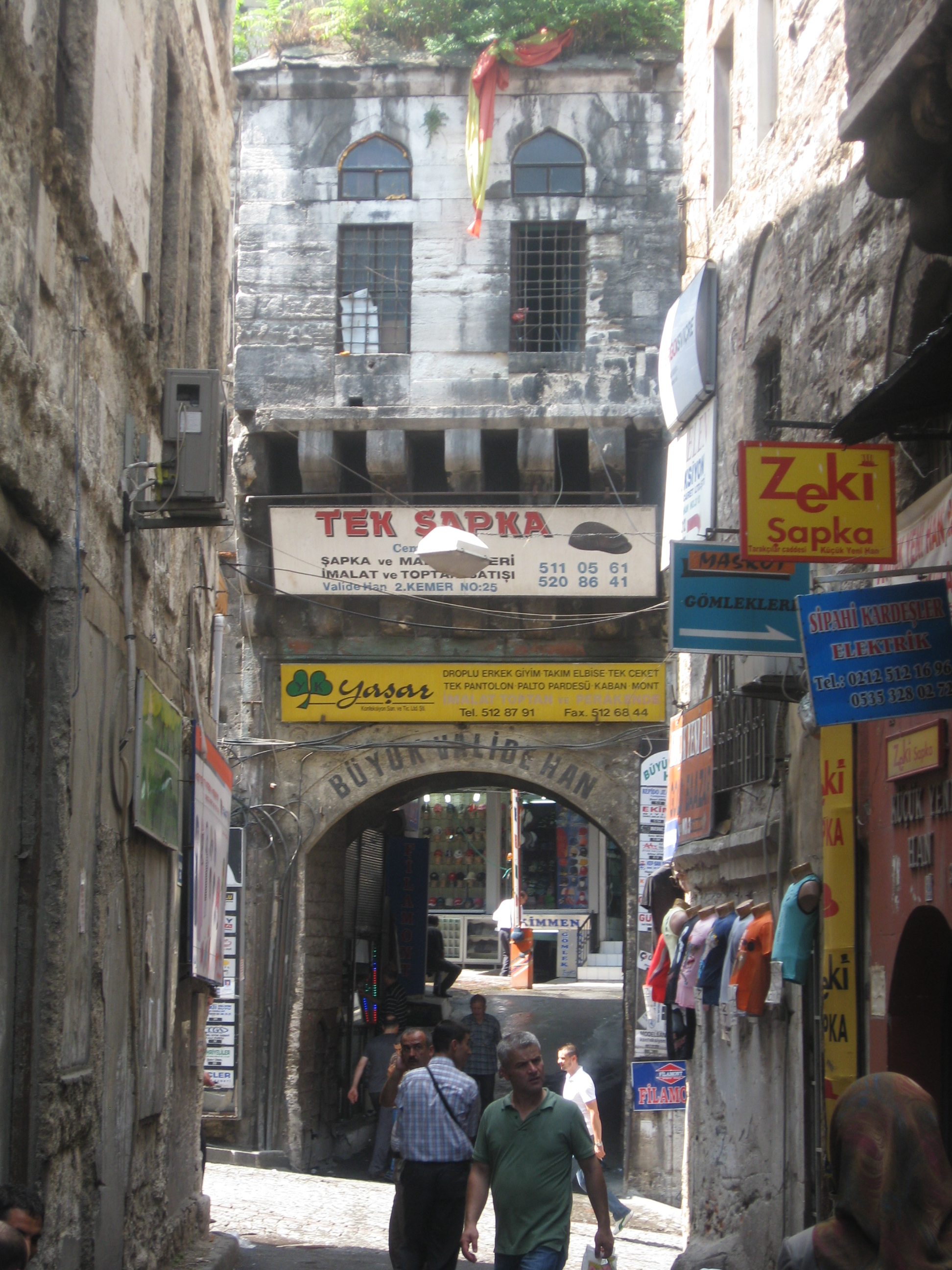
Mehmetpaşa

Ordinary Christians and Jews, especially those living in old Istanbul, although they retained their language and faith, were increasingly assimilating with the Muslim environment at the everyday level. Unlike them, the "Franks" of Galata and Pera were completely alien to the social environment of the Turks, contacting only with Greeks and, for commerce — with Jews and some Ottoman officials (the "Franks" community was quite small: in the 16th century there were several dozen, in the 17th century — about three hundred). "Franks" were cut off from the official career (except for individuals who converted to Islam) and work in traditional corporations, often they did not have permission to bring their family (in such cases, "Franks" married Greek or Armenian women, but their children still remained subjects of the Ottoman Empire). The centers of social life for the "Franks" were Catholic churches, where Italian and French priests served (in Galata and Pera these were the churches of Saint Mary, Saint Peter, Saint Benedict, Saint George, and Saint Francis).

At the turn of the 17th–18th centuries, Istanbul was a major center of currency operations, where the most diverse coins circulated: golden Ottoman sultanis (also altuns, filuris, and shahis), Egyptian ashrafis (also esrefi altun, sherefi, and sherifs), Venetian sequins and ducats, German ducats, silver Ottoman akçe, kuruşes (also piastres) and paras, Austrian thalers, Dutch leeuwendaalders (also esedi-kuruş and arslans), Seville piastres (also Mexican piastres, sumuns, and timins), French sous, copper Ottoman mangırs and aspers. The Dutch, English, and French who purchased goods in Istanbul often paid with "debauched coins" in which the admixture of noble metals was less than in their Western European counterparts. The city had numerous exchange offices belonging to Genoese, Venetians, French, Dutch, English, as well as local Jews.

== Mahmud I's era ==
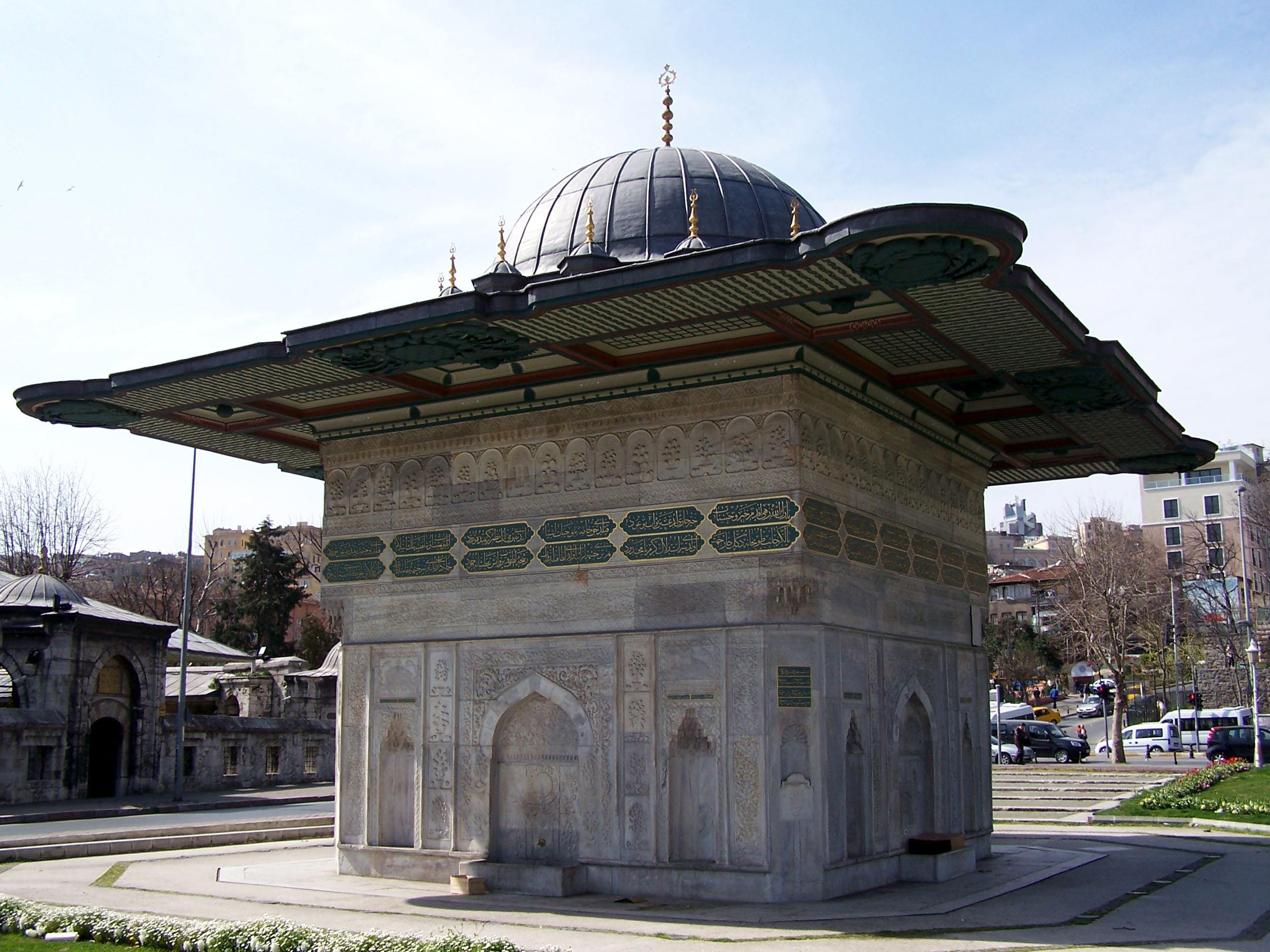
Tophane Fountain (1732)

On 7 October 1730, in Istanbul, the enthronement ceremony of Sultan Mahmud I, son of Mustafa II, took place. He fulfilled the demands of the rebels — he canceled surcharges on old taxes and all new taxes. When the situation in the capital eased, the sultan's close associates were able to split the ranks of the opposition through bribes and threats. On 26 November 1730, Patrona Halil and other rebellion leaders were invited to the palace for negotiations and killed (their bodies were thrown into the sea from the palace walls). Great influence in the reign of Mahmud I was held by the Grand Vizier Hekimoğlu Ali Pasha (1732–1735 and 1742–1743), who built a large mosque of his name in Istanbul.

In 1737, in Üsküdar, at the artillery barracks, the first educational institution in the country's history was opened, where exact sciences were studied, including applied mathematics. This school was founded by the French Ahmed Pasha, who sought to bring the backward Turkish army to the level of modern military art and prepare officers with serious mathematical and engineering knowledge. However, all attempts to radically reform the army encountered desperate resistance from the Janissary corps. In 1740, the sultan opened a library in the right aisle of the Hagia Sophia mosque. Mahmud I died in December 1754 and was buried in the türbe at the New Mosque.

== Era of Osman III ==
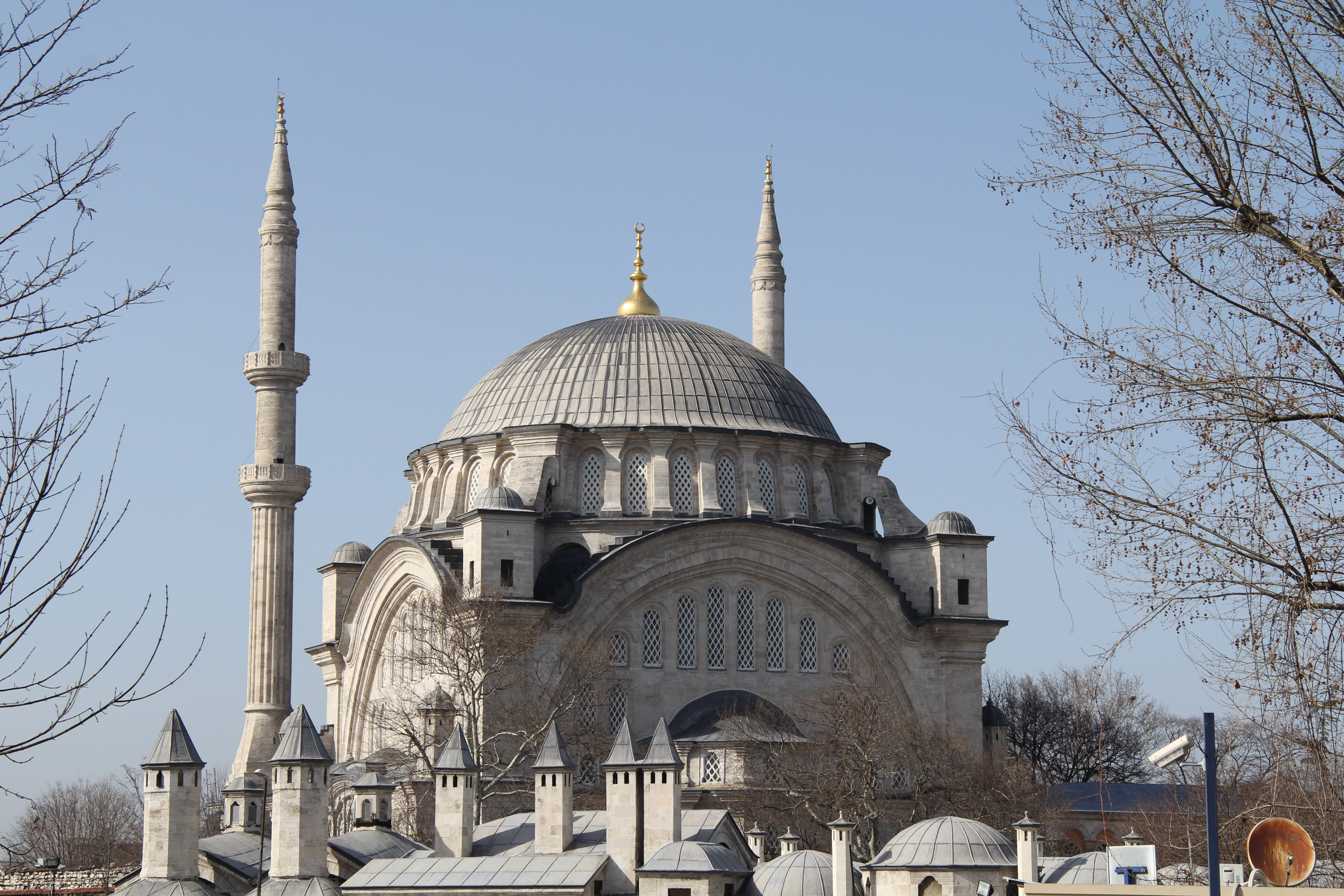
Nuruosmaniye Mosque

After the death of Mahmud I, his younger brother Osman III ascended the throne, who had spent about half a century in the "Cage" before that. He did not like music and women, led an ascetic lifestyle. During the short reign of Osman III, several grand viziers were replaced (the property of officials who fell out of favor was confiscated in favor of the sultan's treasury), in the capital, the "unbelievers" (Christians and Jews) were oppressed. In the same era, in Istanbul, the famous physician and astronomer Abbas Vesim Efendi worked, who opened a hospital and pharmacy, the historian Seyyid Mohammed Rıza, the expansion of the sultan's palace continued. In 1755, in the Anadolukavağı district, near the old Yoros Castle, a mosque, tekke, and a wall around the tomb of Saint Joshua were built, which became a place of pilgrimage for Sufis. In the same 1755, near the Grand Bazaar, the construction of the marble Nuruosmaniye Mosque ("Light of the Ottomans") was completed, begun under Mahmud I. The mosque complex included a madrasa, library, kitchens, and the türbe of Şehsuvar Sultan — the sultan's mother, who died in 1756. Osman III himself died in October 1757 and was buried in the türbe at the New Mosque.

== Mustafa III's era ==
Mustafa III ascended the throne, son of Ahmed III. In 1761, in Istanbul, with the assistance of the advisor to the Turkish army, Baron de Tott, several special schools for navigators, artillerymen, and fortifiers were opened. In 1763, the Laleli Mosque ("Tulip") was built — the last of the large sultanic mosques. In 1766, a powerful earthquake occurred, as a result of which many houses and mosques were damaged (including the Fatih and Süleymaniye mosques). In 1773, after the defeat of the Ottoman fleet in the Chesma Battle, in the Sütlüce quarter, a naval engineering school was organized (currently, the Istanbul Technical University operates on its basis — the oldest higher school in Turkey). However, all attempts to carry out reforms in the army and state apparatus were suppressed by conservative circles, the core of which consisted of Janissaries and Muslim clergy. Mustafa III died in January 1774 (buried in the türbe at the Laleli Mosque), after which his younger brother Abdul Hamid I ascended the throne.

== Abdul Hamid I's era ==
In the initial period of Abdul Hamid I's reign, the state experienced a large-scale crisis. Officials, troops, and even Janissaries often went without pay, and in wars the Ottoman Empire suffered one defeat after another. The sultan was forced to undertake some reforms of the Janissary corps, the fleet, and the artillery; he actively attracted foreign specialists (especially French ones) and opened modern schools. In 1778, on the Üsküdar waterfront, the Beylerbeyi Mosque was built. For his piety and generosity, Abdul Hamid enjoyed popularity among the people; he even personally participated in extinguishing a large fire that raged in Istanbul in 1782. In April 1785, on suspicion of preparing a coup, the grand vizier and prominent reformer-Francophile Khalil Hamid Pasha was dismissed and soon executed. Abdul Hamid died in the sultan's palace in April 1789, and he was succeeded on the Ottoman throne by Selim III, son of Mustafa III.

== Selim III's era ==
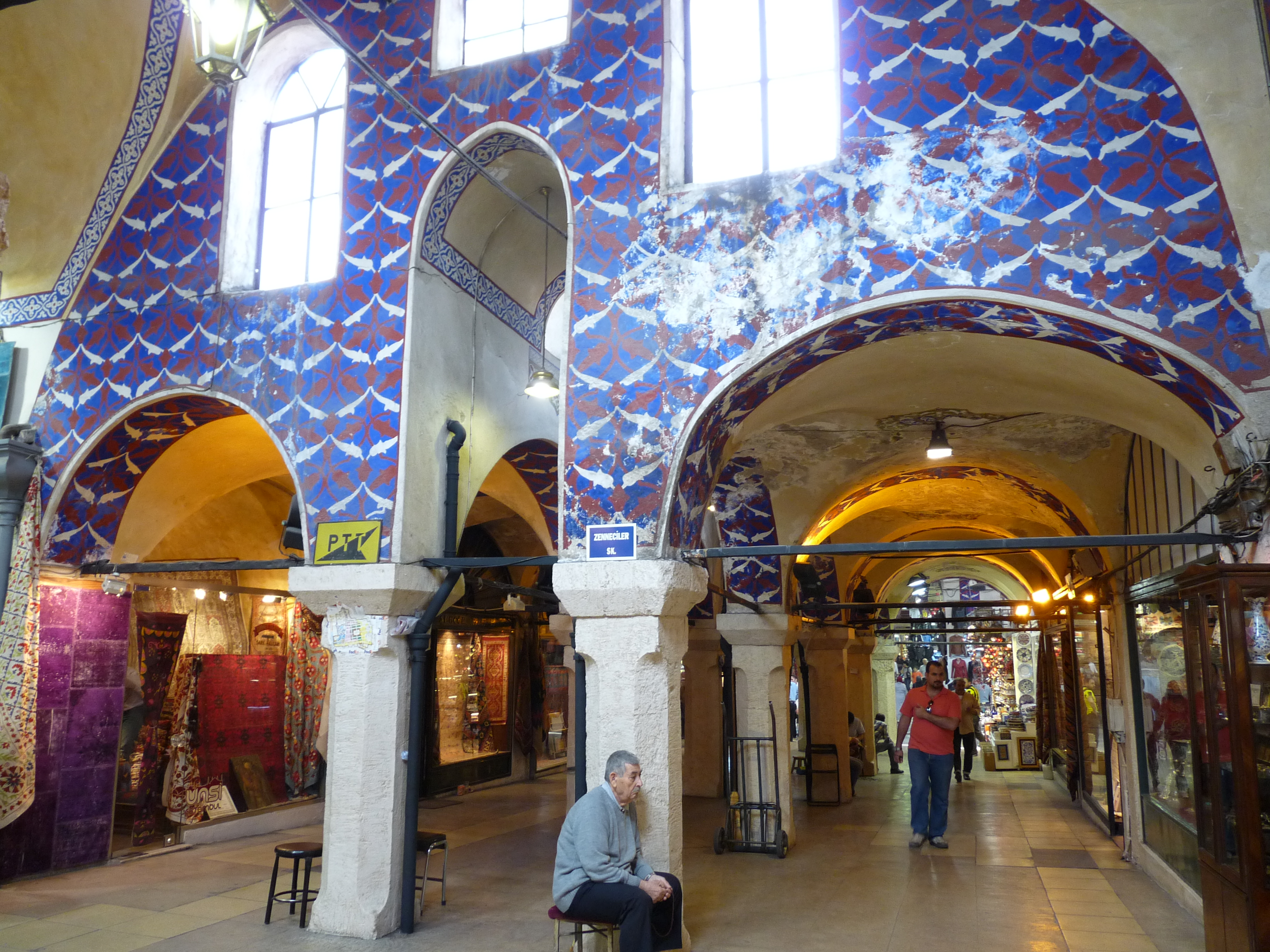
Kapalı Çarşı

In 1794, on the territory of the current Şişli district, the Teşvikiye Mosque was built (in the second half of the 19th century, it was rebuilt in the Neo-Baroque style). In 1795, in Istanbul, a school was opened to train army engineers and artillerymen. At the turn of the 18th–19th centuries, the expanded Kapalı Çarşı represented an entire trading city, in which there were several thousand shops and craft workshops, numerous cafés and restaurants, exchange and credit offices, an entire slave exchange, its own mosques, caravanserais, and even a cemetery. During the day, the long corridors, more resembling small streets, were illuminated through openings in the roof. The vaults and walls were decorated with paintings and mosaics. Individual trading rows had merchants offering jewelry, incense, fabrics, shoes, cold weapons, and ancient manuscripts.

After the start of the Egyptian campaign of Napoleon in 1798, the Franco-Ottoman alliance fell apart and almost all the French teachers left Istanbul. Having concluded peace with France, the sultan began reforming the administrative apparatus. He also patronized education, printing, and culture (especially musicians and composers, among whom Dede Efendi stood out). In October 1805, in the capital, the valide sultan Mihrişah Sultan died (buried in a türbe at the complex built with her funds). With the help of the French general Sébastiani, the Turks strengthened the capital's defensive system and proceeded to create the army of the new order. In 1807, by the order of the sultan, in Üsküdar, next to the Selimiye Mosque (Selimiye Camii) erected in 1803, large Selimiye Barracks were built, named Selimiye. Soon after this, the Janissaries, dissatisfied with the reforms and the increase in taxes, raised a revolt, deposed Selim III, and enthroned Mustafa IV, son of Abdulhamid I.

== Mustafa IV's era ==
Ascending the throne during the Janissary revolt (May 1807), Mustafa IV placed his predecessor under guard in the palace. The new grand vizier Çelebi Mustafa Pasha canceled all of Selim's military reforms and unleashed repressions against their supporters. In July 1808, troops loyal to Selim under the leadership of Alemdar Mustafa Pasha occupied Istanbul, stormed the palace, and attempted to free the prisoner, but he was strangled on the orders of the sultan. Alemdar Mustafa Pasha arrested Mustafa IV and enthroned his younger brother Mahmud II, becoming grand vizier under him. In November 1808, a new mutiny of the Janissary corps broke out in the capital, during which Mahmud II ordered the killing of the former sultan Mustafa IV, whom the rebels sought to return to the throne, and the Janissaries burned the grand vizier Alemdar Mustafa Pasha in his palace. Having suppressed the mutiny, Mahmud II brutally dealt with the rebels and their sympathizers.

== Mahmud II's era ==
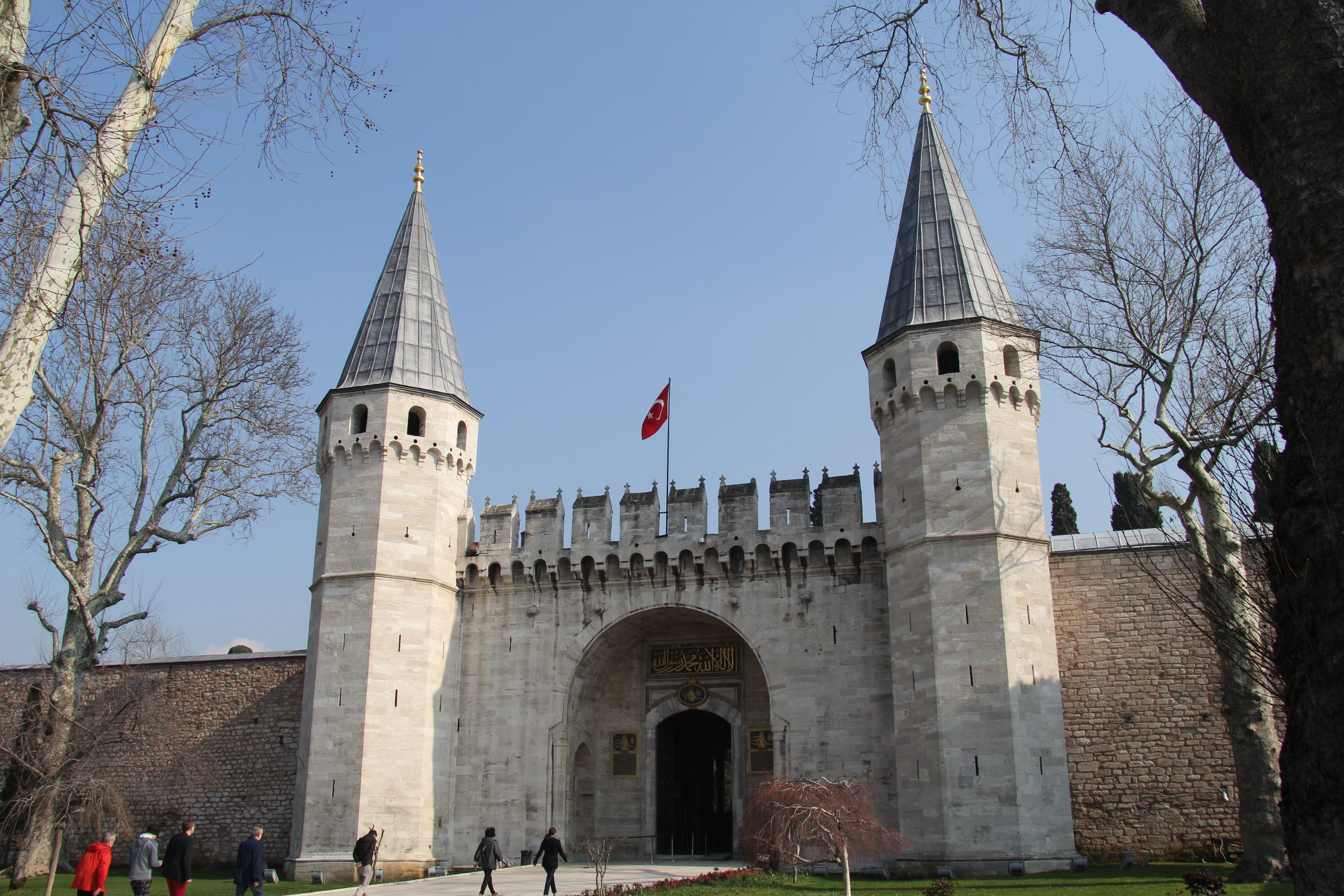
Gate of Greeting

During the reign of Mahmud II, the Topkapı Palace complex acquired its current appearance. It was surrounded by a high stone wall, inside which numerous buildings and palaces were connected to each other by mahbeyns (open terraces whose roofs rested on pillars). To the right of Hagia Sophia were the main gates of the palace — Bab-i Hümayun (Sublime Porte), above which the heads of the executed were displayed every morning. From them, past the former Church of Saint Irene, which had been converted by the Ottomans into an armory, ran an alley that ended at the Middle Gate (Ortakapı) or Gate of Greeting (Bab es-Selam). The first courtyard housed the administrations of finance, archives, and waqfs, the assay office, the imperial treasury, the palace medical center, a stable for guests arriving at the palace on horseback, as well as the guard and executioners who executed disgraced officials. The second courtyard, known as the "diplomatic" one, was surrounded by a low gallery with marble columns. Here was the building of the Imperial Council with a square tower, from which the sultan addressed the people on solemn occasions, various services (the sultan's chancellery, the state treasury), rooms for guests and palace kitchens, as well as a square with fountains.

From the second courtyard, through the Gate of Felicity (Bab-i Saadet), which was guarded by eunuchs, one could enter the third courtyard, the sultan's residence. Here were located the richly decorated audience hall (Arz Odası), a large library, the luxurious harem, the sultan's treasury and private chambers, as well as the school for training administrative personnel, the Enderun, and the living quarters of the staff. The fourth courtyard was a place of rest for the sultans and consisted of a small garden with fountains and pavilions. From the gallery surrounding the octagonal Baghdad Köşkü, or from the adjacent large terrace, the sultans admired the view of the Bosphorus and the Golden Horn. Here were also the chambers of the chief court physician and the chief tutor of the sultan, and at the end of the garden rose the Column of the Goths, preserved from ancient times. The entire palace complex stretched from Bahçekapı on the Golden Horn to Ahırkapı on the Sea of Marmara. In Ahırkapı was located a huge aviary with a large number of various birds, and nearby — the sultan's menagerie with lions, tigers, panthers, and other beasts. Next to Topkapı, on the edge of the former hippodrome, were the barracks of the Janissary corps, usually accommodating from 10 to 12 thousand guardsmen (they not only guarded the palace but were also used to maintain order in the capital). During the reign of Mahmud II, the Janissaries turned into the main bastion of feudal-clerical reaction, the main source of mutinies and unrest, the irreconcilable opponent of any innovations and reforms, especially in the Ottoman army.

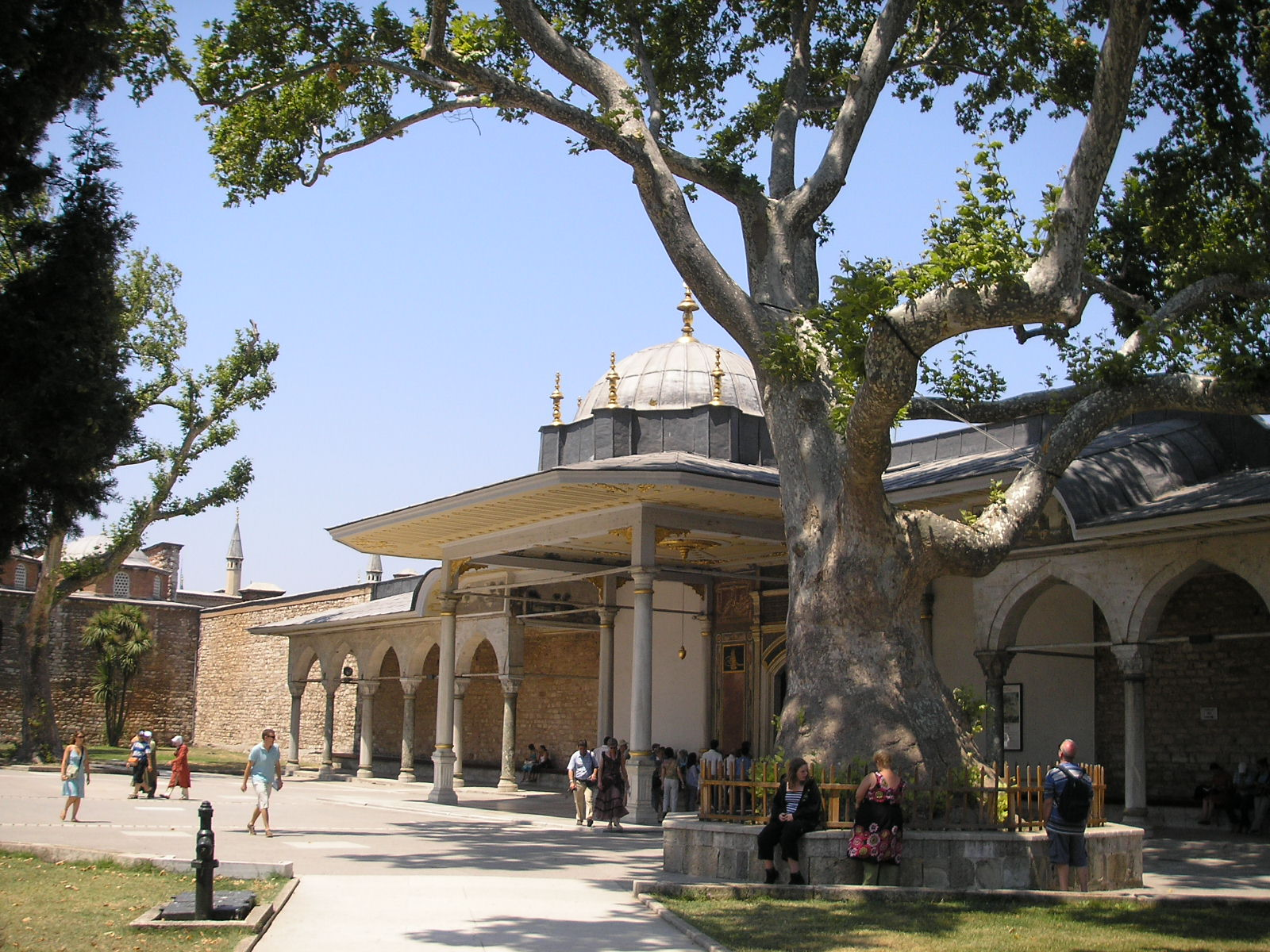
Gate of Felicity

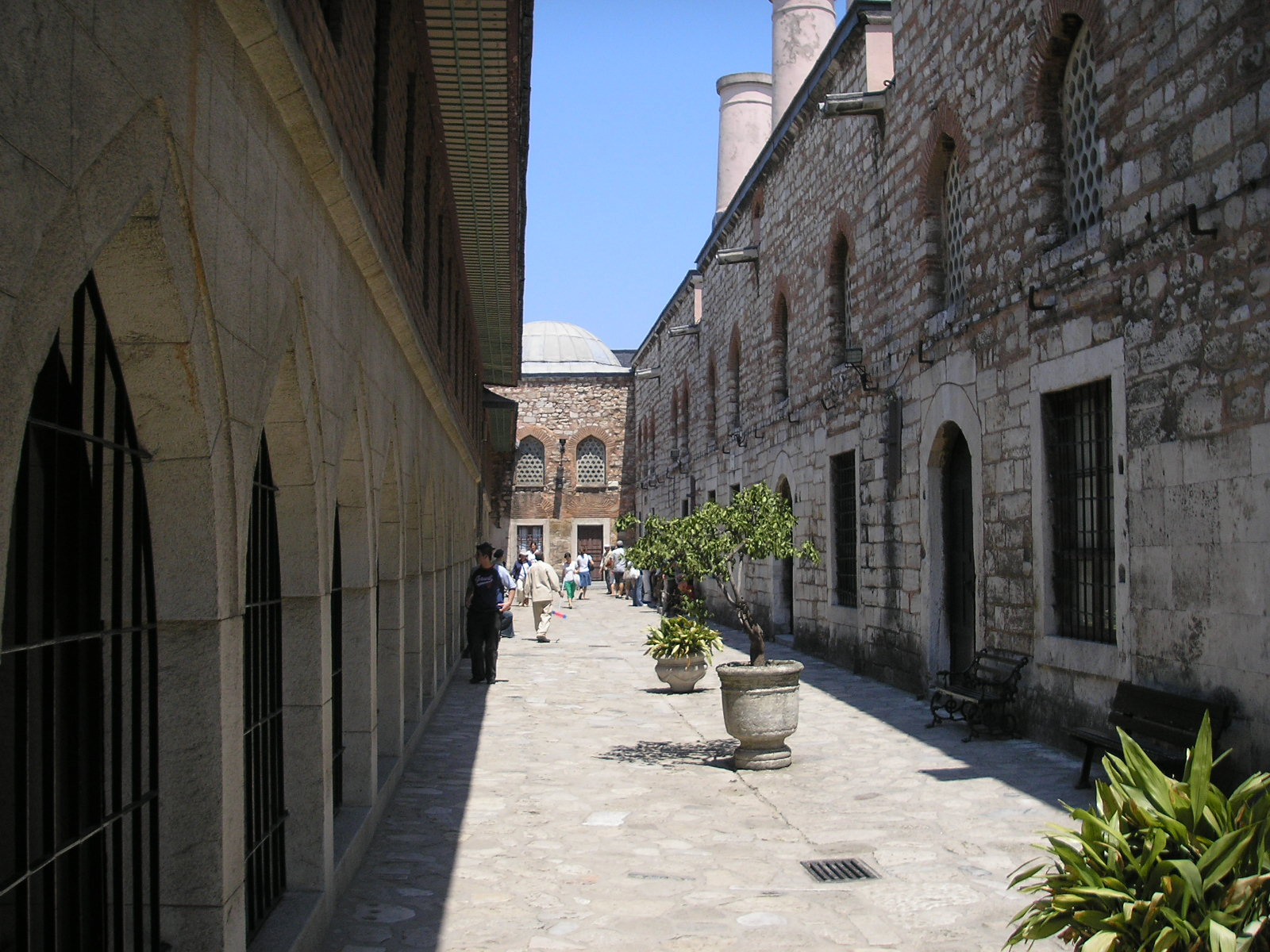
Palace kitchens

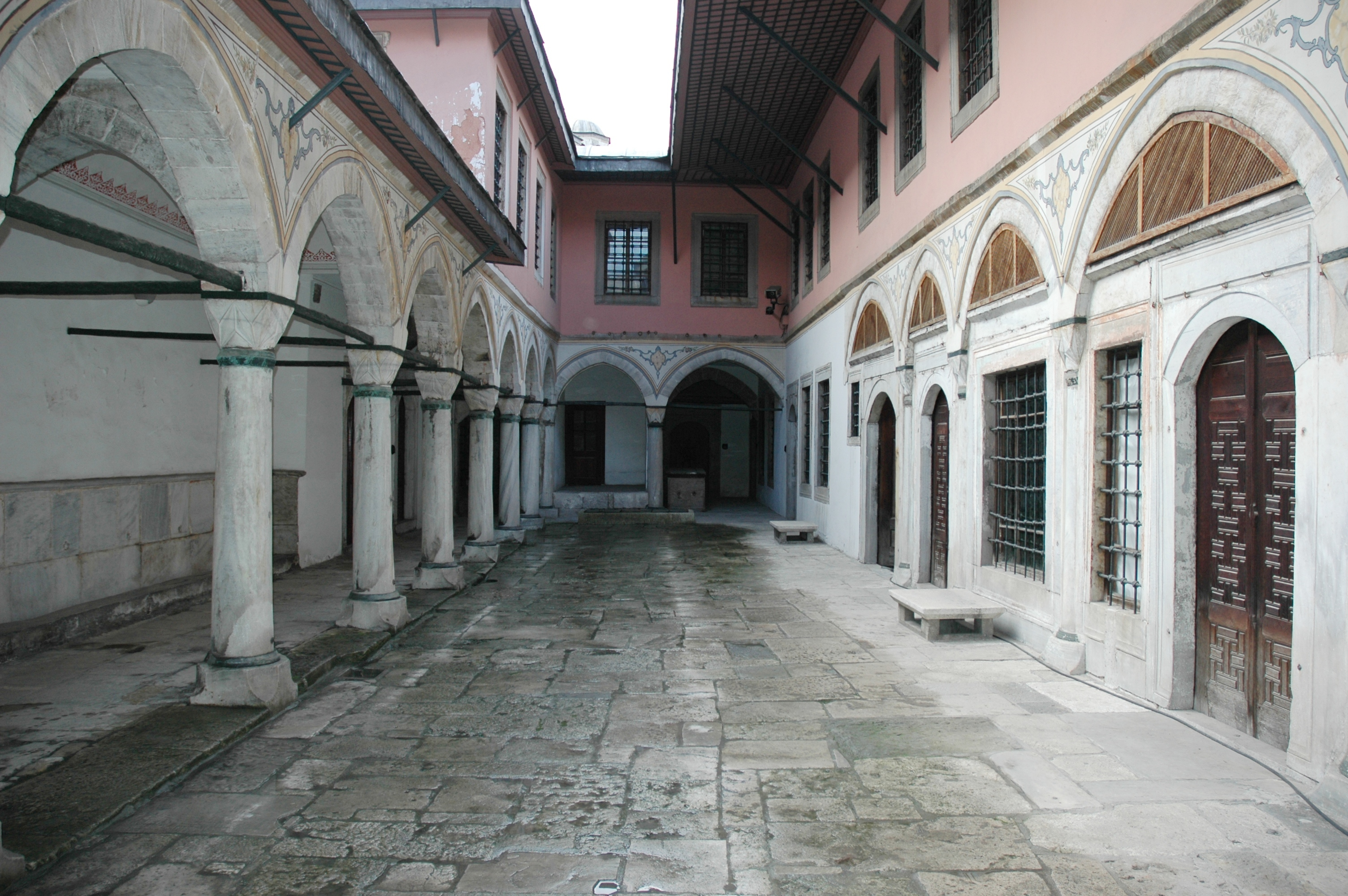
Inner courtyard of the harem

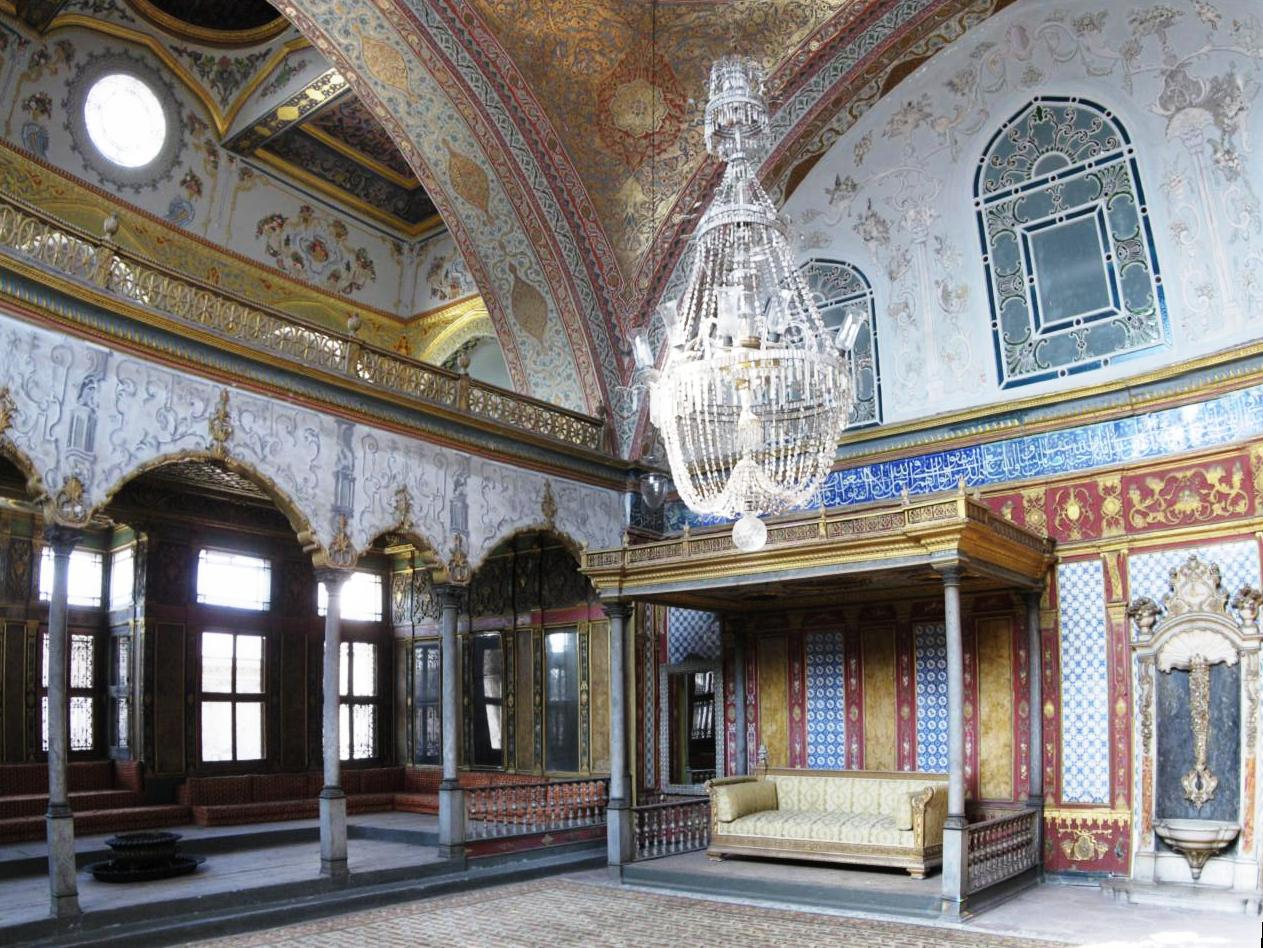
Sultan's hall

During the anti-Ottoman uprising of 1821, later called the revolution and war of independence, the Ecumenical Patriarch Gregory V under pressure from the Ottoman authorities condemned the Greek rebels and even excommunicated them from the Church. Despite this display of loyalty, on April 10 he was deposed and hanged at the gates of the patriarchal residence, and his successor Eugene II was forced to pass by the hanging corpse for three days.

On June 15, 1826, the Janissaries, dissatisfied with the sultan's military and economic reforms, raised a revolt against Mahmud II. After sunset, they filled the central square of Hippodrome and began to smash the homes of reformist officials. The rebels demanded that the sultan cancel the decree on the creation of a regular infantry corps. In response, Mahmud II moved loyal troops against the Janissaries and blocked them on the square. The rebels rejected the offer to express submission to the sultan and lay down their arms. Then the units sent by Mahmud shelled the Janissary barracks ons and quickly suppressed the uprising. In the fire of the blaze, thousands of Janissaries perished; the survivors were finished off by soldiers of the artillery units who burst onto the square, and the rest were hunted throughout the city, being killed right in their homes and on the streets. More than 300 Janissaries were executed by sentence of a specially created court. On June 17, the sultan announced the dissolution of the Janissary corps (Mahmud II's decree was read in the Blue Mosque), which brought major changes to life in Istanbul.

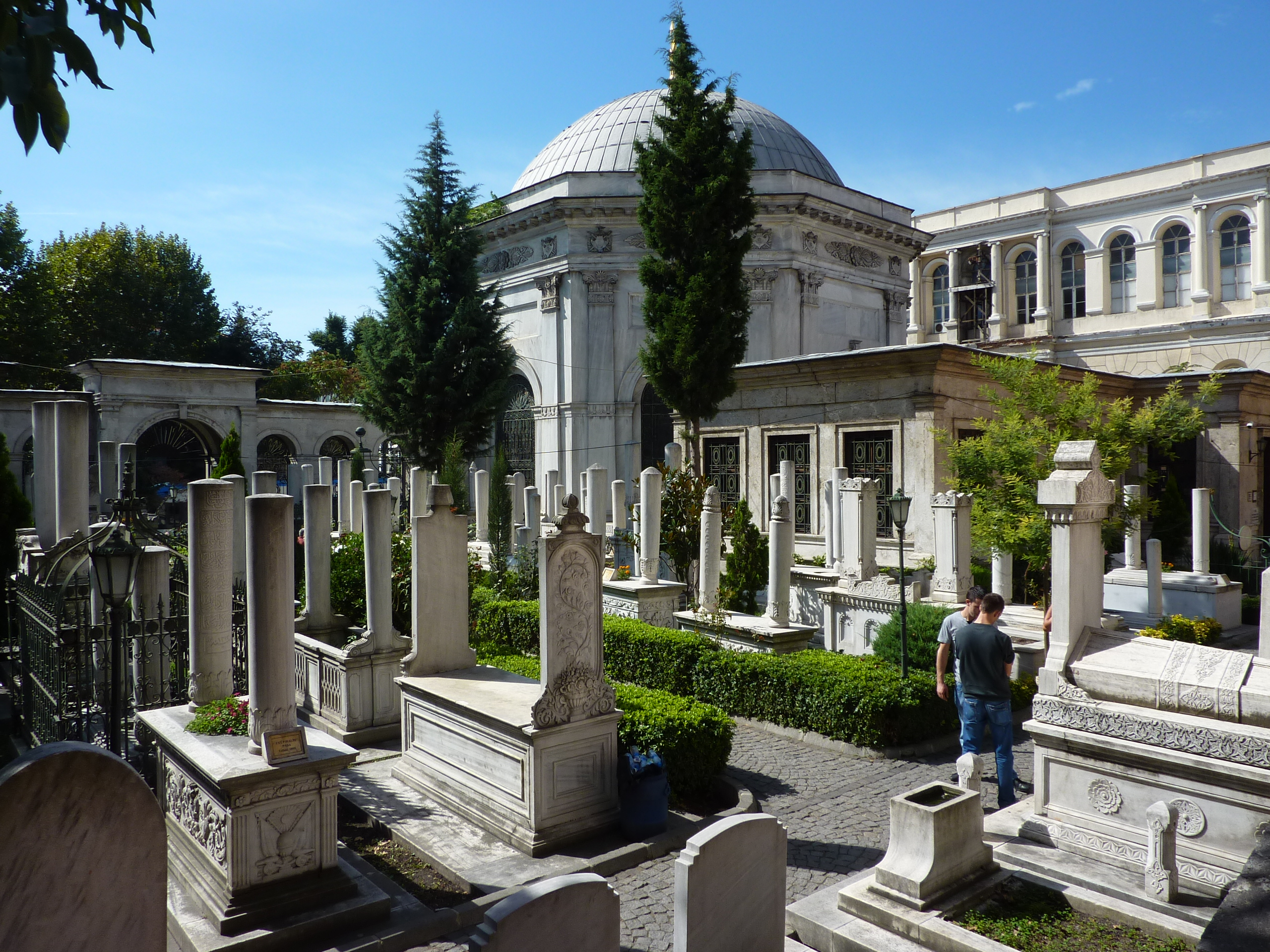
Mausoleum of Mahmud II

The abolition of the Janissary corps was accompanied by brutal persecution of the closely allied Sufi order of the Bektashis. In 1826, a military medical school was opened in Istanbul, which played a significant role in the cultural development of the city and the country. During the Russo-Turkish War (1828–1829), Russian prisoners were held on the island of Heybeliada. In 1829, a cholera epidemic broke out in the capital, and the authorities turned the legendary Maiden's Tower, located on a small islet off the coast of Üsküdar, into a quarantine isolator. On November 1, 1831, the first official Turkish-language newspaper, Takvim-i Vekayi (Calendar of Events), was published. In the summer of 1833, a 10,000-strong Russian army camped near Istanbul, and a Russian squadron under the command of Admiral Mikhail Lazarev entered the Bosphorus. This was done at the request of the sultan in response to the advance of the Egyptian troops of Ibrahim Pasha, who had defeated the Turkish army. As a result, the viceroy's troops were stopped, and Russia and the Ottoman Empire signed the Treaty of Hünkâr İskelesi. In memory of these events, on June 25, 1833, Russian and Turkish soldiers installed a granite boulder about 5 meters high on the top of a hill rising on the Selyeburnu cape. Also in 1833, in the Samatya district, on the site of an ancient Byzantine monastery, the Greek Orthodox Church of Saint Mena was built. In 1835, on the site of another ancient Byzantine monastery, the Church of the Life-Giving Spring was built. In 1836–1837, in Istanbul, as part of the reform of the administrative apparatus, the ministries of foreign affairs, internal affairs, and the war ministry were created (the Prussian captain Moltke took an active part in the reform and training of the Turkish army). In 1839, Mahmud II moved the sultan's residence to the Bosphorus shore, after which Topkapı began to fall into disrepair.

By the end of Mahmud II's reign, the Ottoman authorities promoted secular education and printing, patronized writers and journalists, fought corruption and reformed the judicial system, stimulated the economy and reduced taxes (in 1838, an important Anglo-Turkish trade agreement was concluded), conducted a population census and established a postal service, introduced documents for domestic and foreign travel. All this caused opposition from the Muslim clergy and part of the officials, especially regional governors. In July 1839, Mahmud II died in Istanbul of tuberculosis, after which his eldest son Abdulmejid I ascended the throne (he built for his father on the main street of Divan Yolu, near the Column of Constantine, a large octagonal türbe, which became the last burial place of the Ottoman sultans).

== Abdulmejid I's era ==
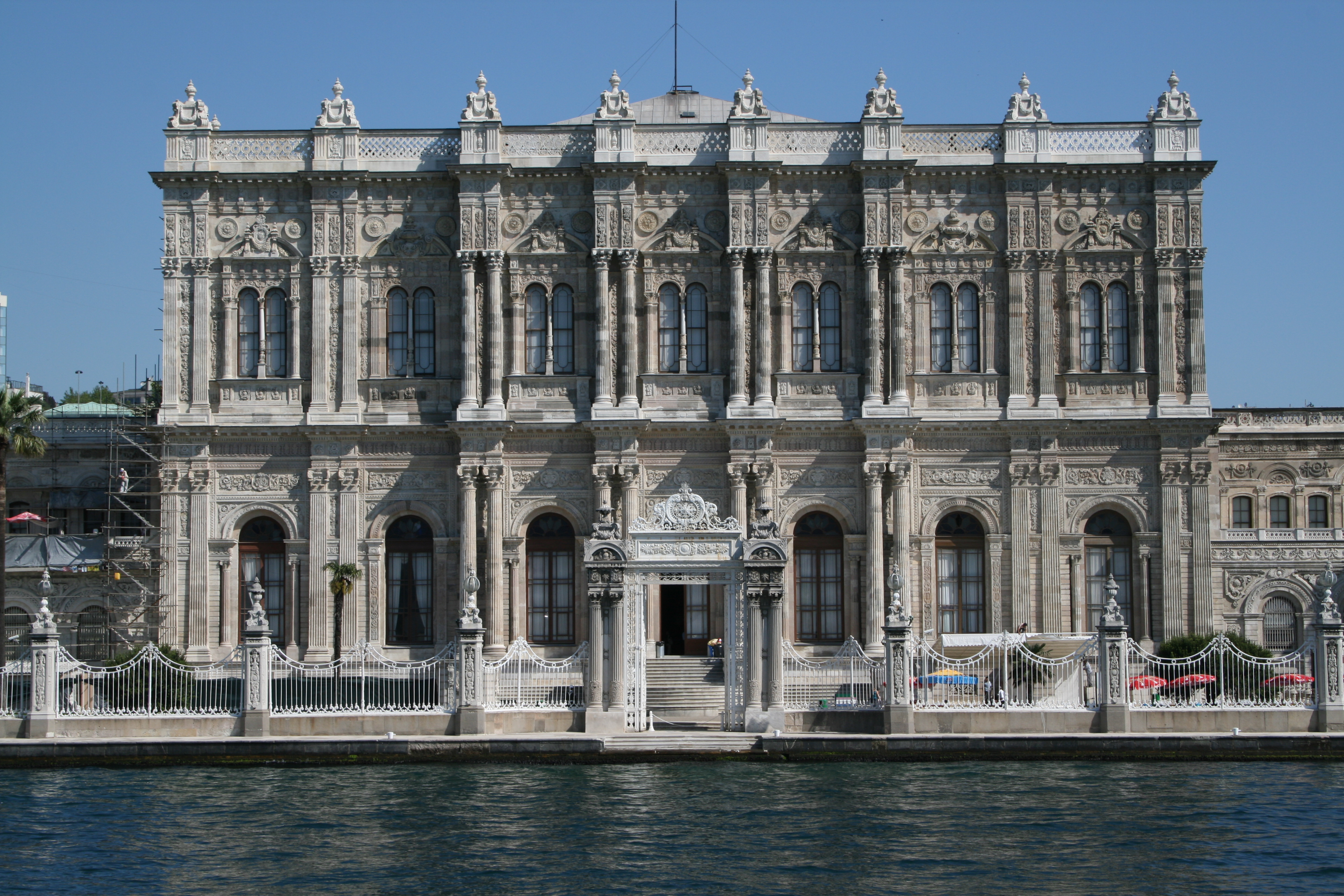
Dolmabahçe Palace

During the Tanzimat era, many government departments and institutions began to acquire European features gradually; the appearance of the capital's bureaucracy began to change, and decrees appeared regulating the appearance of civil servants (even down to the length of mustaches). European influence began to affect the clothing and manners of officials, merchants, and the intelligentsia. Eastern garments began to give way to European suits, the traditional turban was replaced by the fez, men's shoes and women's stockings came into fashion, the size of beards decreased, the younger generation of the upper classes began to speak French, and European carriages on elliptical springs appeared on the streets.

Under Abdulmejid, non-Muslims were again permitted to serve in the Ottoman army, and the reform of the empire's legislation continued. In the mid-19th century, Istanbul became the center for the formation of the young Turkish intelligentsia, which soon began to influence all the most important spheres of the political and cultural life of the empire's capital. This was particularly facilitated by the development of secular education. In addition to new military schools and educational institutions for training civil service officials, by the mid-century, the first general education secular primary schools also began to appear. In 1848, the country's first men's teacher training college was opened in Istanbul. In the same year, in the Pangalti quarter (Şişli), the Ottoman Military School was opened, which later became the basis for the establishment of the Turkish Military Academy.

On October 1, 1844, on the island of Heybeliada (Halki), at the initiative of Patriarch Germanos IV and with the permission of the Turkish authorities, the restored Orthodox Monastery of the Holy Trinity and the theological school attached to it were opened, which soon became the main forge of cadres for the Church of Constantinople. In 1845, in the new building of the Russian embassy in Pera, the Church of Saint Nicholas the Wonderworker was consecrated (later, in 1867, in the building of the old embassy in Büyükdere, which was rebuilt and turned into the ambassador's country residence, a small Orthodox church was also consecrated).

Also in 1845, by order of the sultan, a wooden pontoon bridge was built, connecting the opposite shores of the Golden Horn. In 1850, steamboat service across the Bosphorus began (initially between Eminönü and Üsküdar). In 1854, the construction of the new sultan's palace Dolmabahçe was completed, which cost the depleted treasury 70 million francs (exceeding a third of the annual revenues to the state budget). It was built on the European shore of the Bosphorus, on the site of a small bay filled with earth (hence the name — "Filled Garden"). The project author was Garabet Balyan — a representative of the famous Armenian family of architects Balyan, which created many buildings in Istanbul. The palace had over 300 rooms, each decorated by European artists differently from the others. The huge throne hall was adorned with a crystal chandelier weighing about 4 tons, presented to the sultan by the Russian tsar. At the request of Sultan Abdulmejid's mother, another small palace for the rest of the courtiers was built near the Anadolu Hisarı fortress. Also in 1854, under the leadership of architect Nikoghayos Balyan, the Ortaköy Mosque was built in the Ottoman Baroque style. It is located on the shore of the Bosphorus and decorated with rich stone carving.

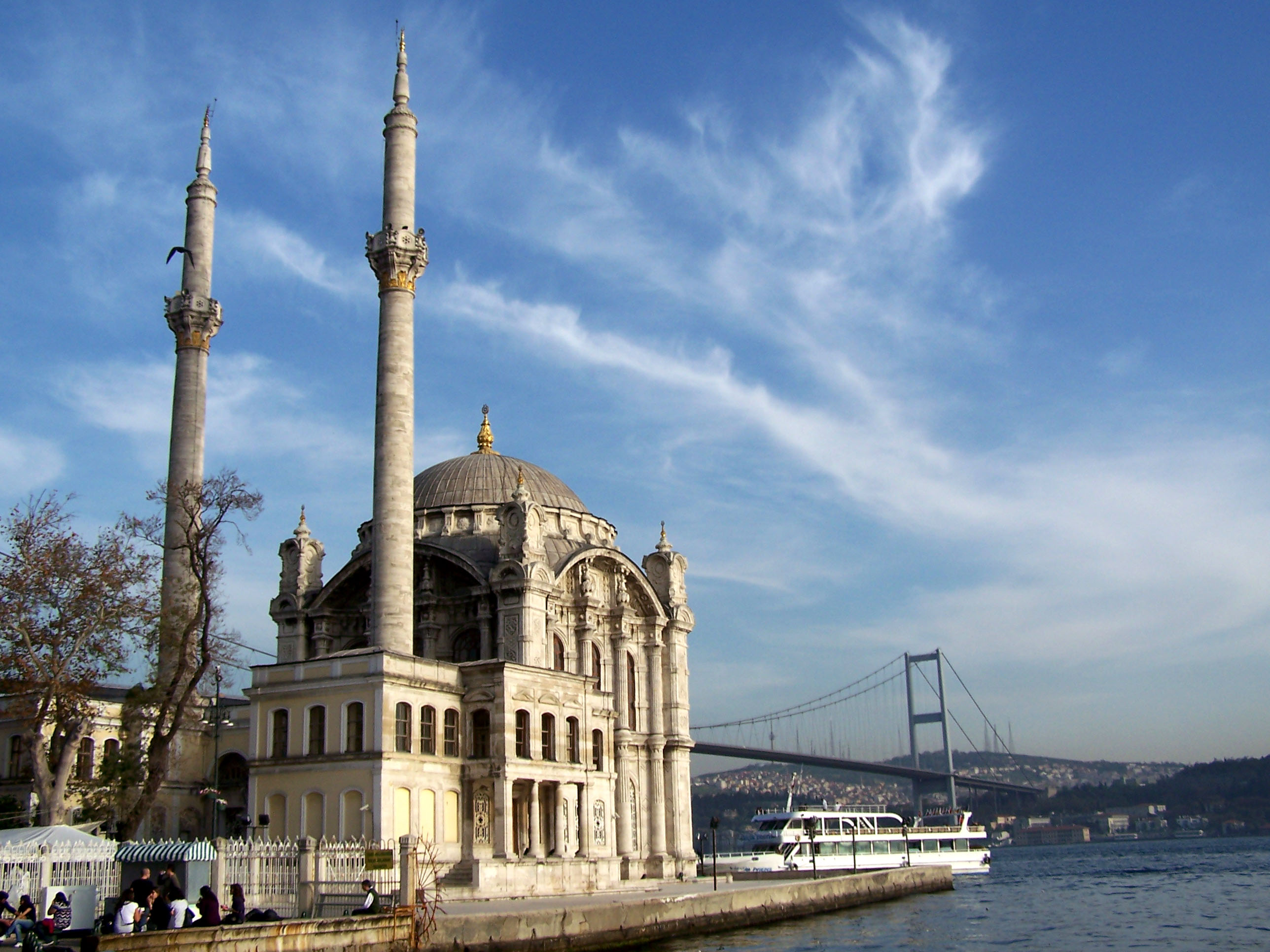
Ortaköy Mosque

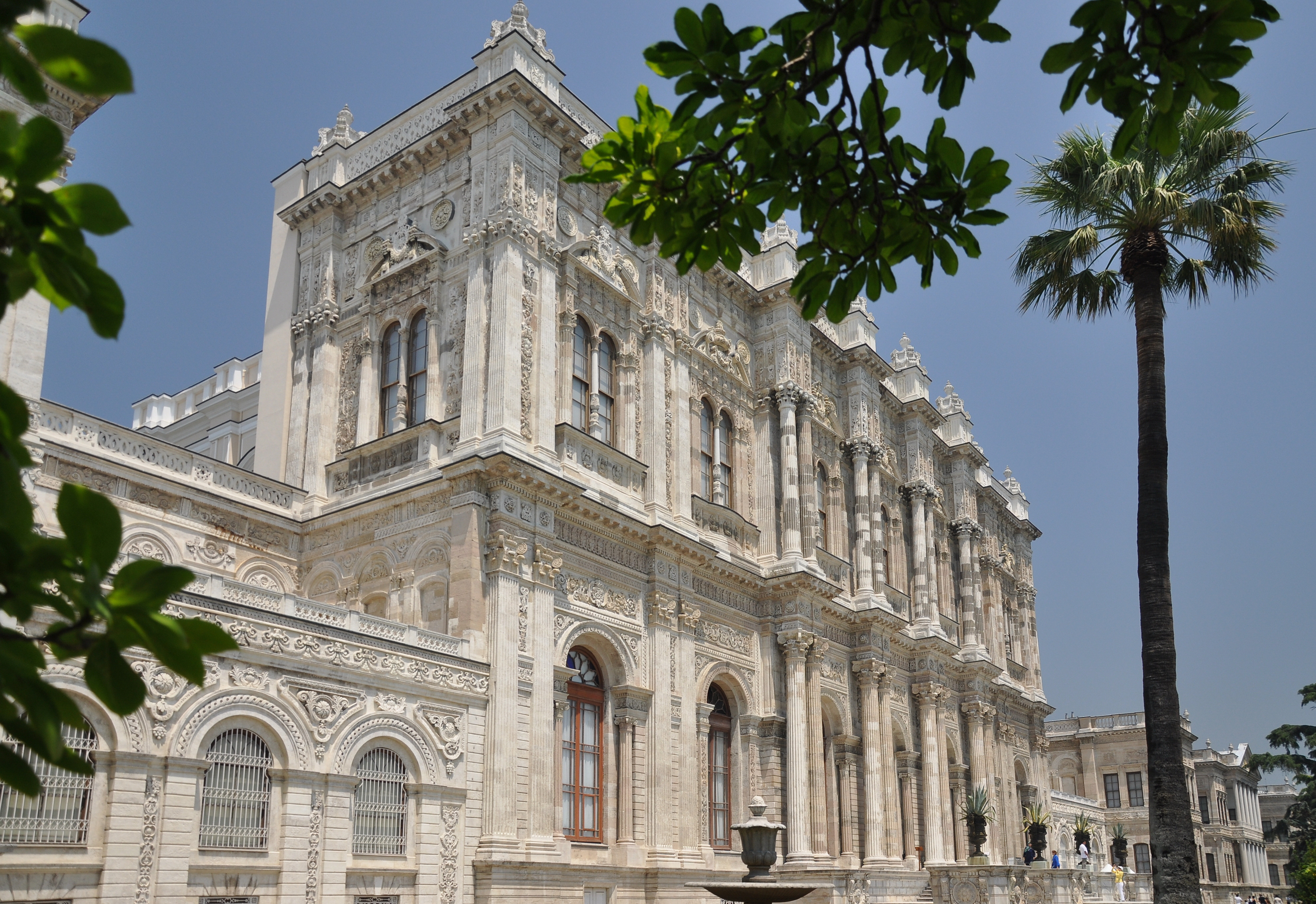
Dolmabahçe Palace

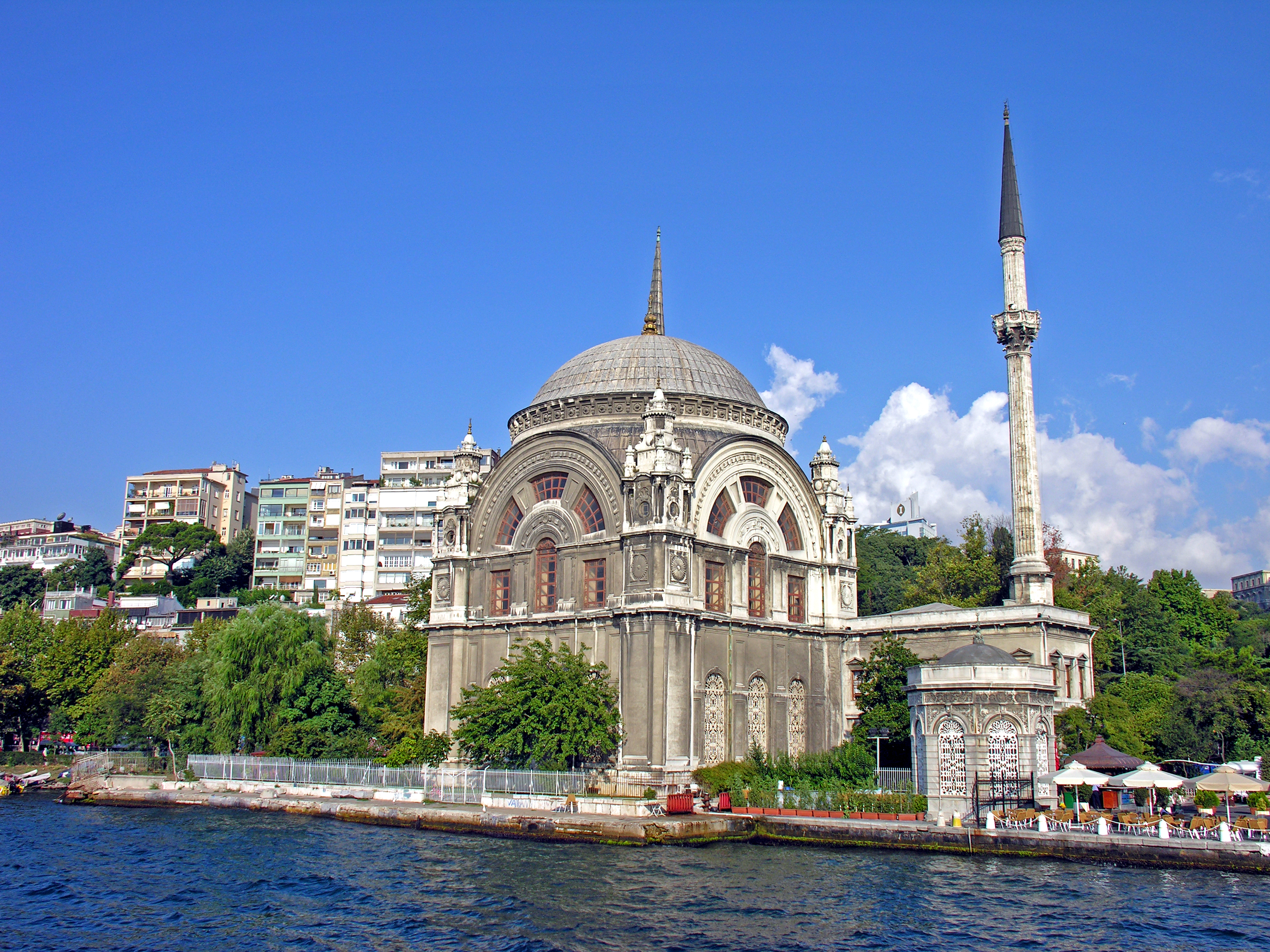
Bezmialem Valide Sultan Mosque

In 1855, in memory of his deceased mother Bezmialem Sultan, Abdulmejid built the Bezmialem Valide Sultan Mosque next to the Dolmabahçe Palace. In the same 1855, the authorities created the Istanbul Improvement Commission, which developed a detailed plan for transformations in the field of urban economy (including new standards for street lighting, building construction, roads, and other infrastructure). In 1856, a major fire raged in the Aksaray district. In the same year, in Galata, the Anglo-Franco-Turkish "Ottoman Bank" was founded (from 1863 to 1924, under the name "Imperial Ottoman Bank," it performed the functions of the country's central bank, and its main office, built to the design of French architect Alexandre Vallaury, was considered the largest building in the city by the end of the 19th century). In 1858, at the end of the bridge across the Golden Horn, Karaköy trading square opened, which became the business center of this noticeably revived part of Galata. In the same 1858, the sultan's treasury was completely depleted, and Abdulmejid was forced to ask for a loan of 9 million francs through Galata merchants to celebrate the marriage of his two daughters. Huge sums went to the maintenance of the court and high officials of the empire, and corruption reached horrifying proportions. In September 1859, the authorities uncovered a conspiracy against the sultan, in which madrasa students, minor officials and arsenal officers, soldiers, and representatives of the Muslim clergy participated (all those arrested were thrown into the casemates of the Küleli Barracks in the Istanbul district of Çengelköy, and then sent to hard labor). In the early 1860s, mass unrest occurred in Istanbul, caused by the rise in prices of essential goods.

After the end of the Crimean War, a wave of Crimean Tatars who fled from the oppression of the Russian authorities settled in Istanbul and the capital's suburbs. In June 1861, Abdulmejid died of tuberculosis, leaving behind six sons, four of whom would also become supreme rulers of the Ottoman Empire in the future (the sultan was buried in the Selim I Yavuz Mosque). Abdulmejid was succeeded by his younger brother Abdulaziz.

== Abdulaziz's era ==
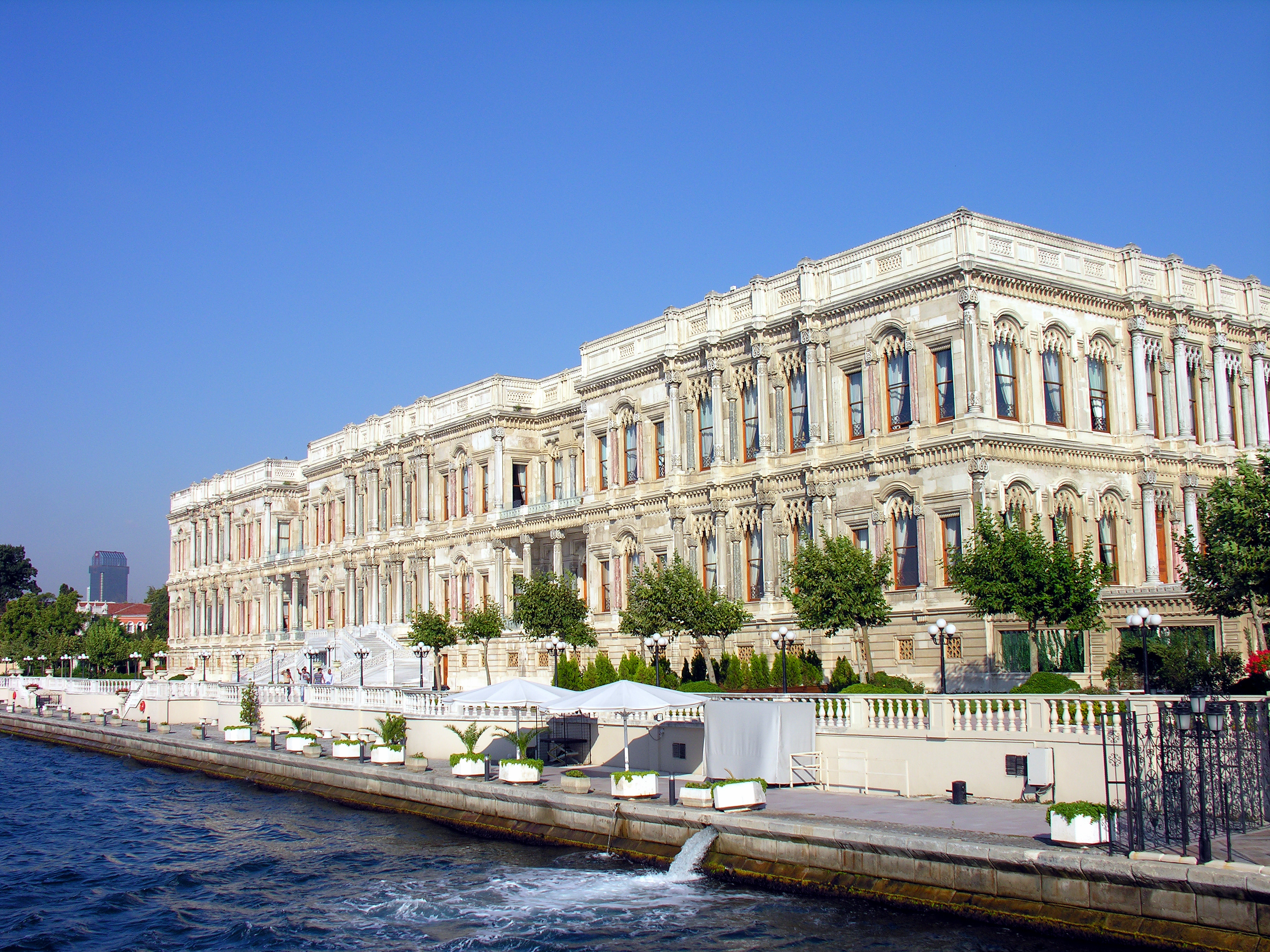
Çırağan

In 1861, in Istanbul, supporters of the Europeanization of the empire established the Ottoman Scientific Society, which set itself broad educational tasks and contributed to the organization of the first Turkish university (in the early 1860s, the construction of the Ottoman University building was largely completed, a university library in various languages was created, books, equipment, and visual aids were ordered in Europe). In addition, the Ottoman Scientific Society created a public library in Istanbul with a large reading room, organized courses in English and French, and in July 1862 began publishing the monthly Journal of Sciences — the first Turkish popular science magazine. It was the members of the Ottoman Scientific Society who became the first teachers of the university, and the first public lecture in its building took place on December 31, 1863. Also in 1863, the American Robert College was founded in Istanbul (today, the Boğaziçi University operates on its basis).

In 1865, on the Asian shore of the Bosphorus, at the foot of the Bulgurlu hill, the summer sultan's Beylerbeyi Palace was built, and in 1867 Abdulaziz moved to the new Çırağan Palace, built on the European shore of the Bosphorus (modern district of Beşiktaş). In the same 1867, on the site of the once famous Byzantine Blachernae Church of the Theotokos, founded as early as the 5th century, a small Greek chapel was built. On September 1, 1868, the prestigious Galatasaray High School opened, which trained school teachers, civil servants, army and navy officers, many of whom later played a prominent role in the development of Turkish education, science, and culture (the high school was patronized by the sultan, government, and French authorities). On February 20, 1870, the Ottoman University was officially opened, but due to a lack of teachers and textbooks, it was downgraded to the status of a secondary educational institution, and at the end of 1871, as a result of attacks by the Muslim clergy, it was closed altogether. In 1874, the university reopened on the basis of the Galatasaray High School, but in 1880, due to staffing difficulties, it closed again. By 1875, there were 264 Turkish secular primary schools in Istanbul, including 25 for girls, in which 13 thousand children studied (at that time, the Muslim population of the capital was about 600 thousand people; thus, there was one child studying in a secular school for every 40-50 residents). During the reign of Abdulaziz, the first secular secondary schools also appeared in Istanbul.

In the 1860s, a large wave of exiles from the North Caucasus settled in Istanbul, who were expelled by the Russian imperial authorities to the Ottoman Empire after the end of the Caucasian War. In Turkey, all Caucasians were called Circassians, although there were many Kabardians, Adyghe, Abkhazians, Abazins, Ubykhs, and Ossetians among them. From the number of Caucasian muhajirs and their numerous descendants came many prominent Turkish statesmen — diplomats, military, and judges, as well as politicians, scientists, journalists, writers, and entrepreneurs. Sultan Abdulaziz did not bother himself much with state affairs, shifting all cares to the shoulders of grand viziers Fuad Pasha (1861–1863 and 1863–1866) and Âli Pasha (1867–1871).

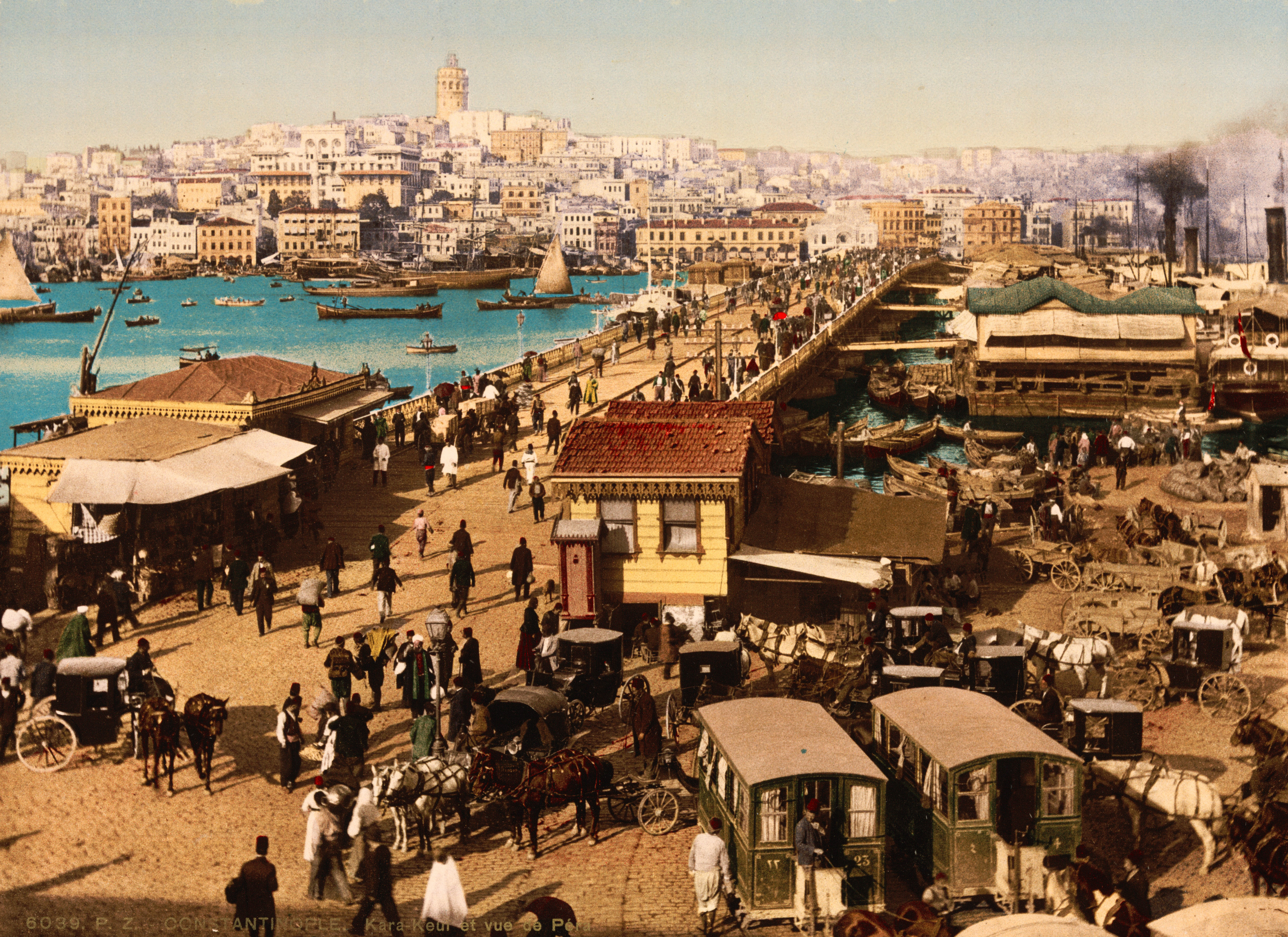
Street traffic

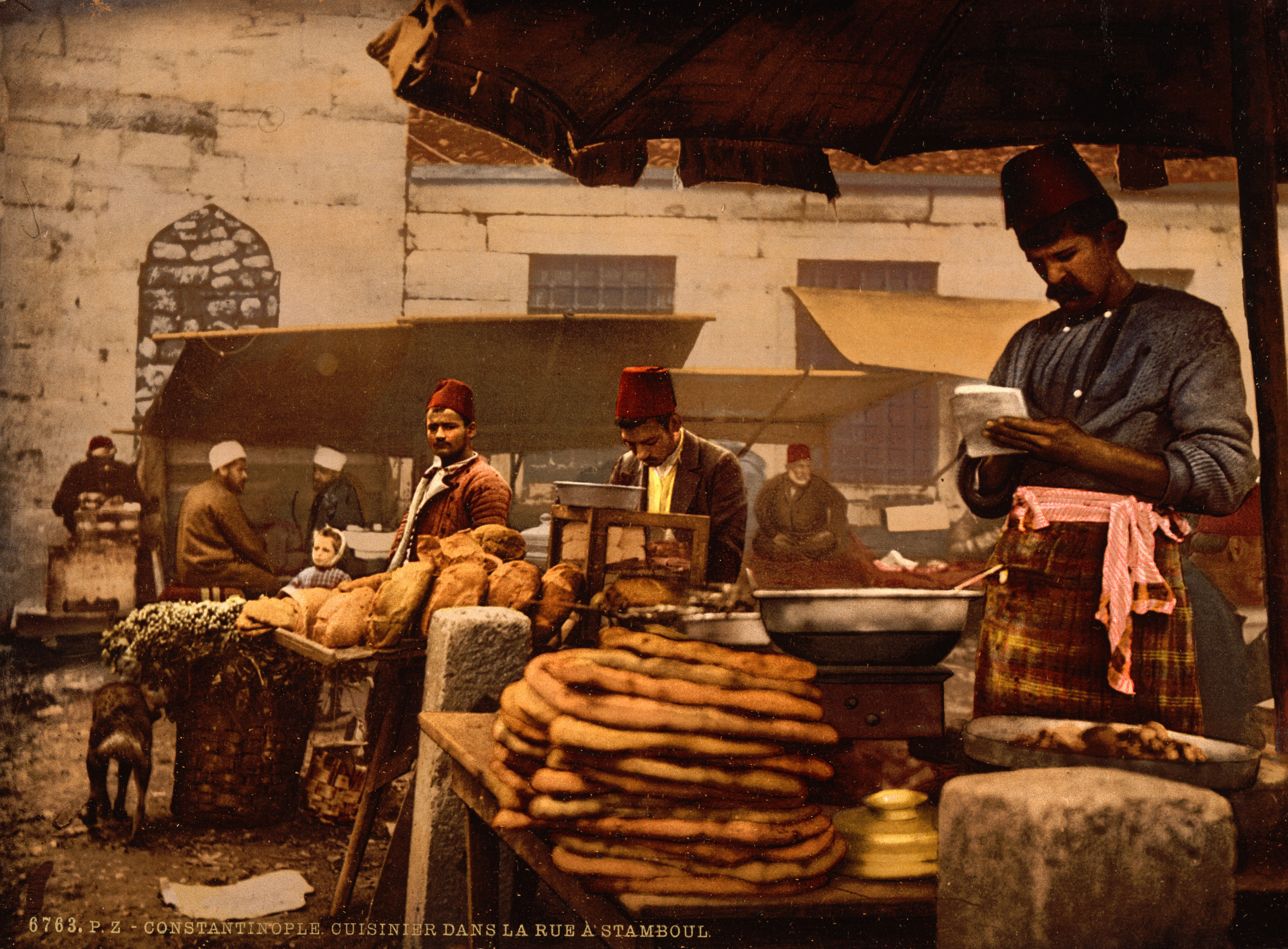
Traders

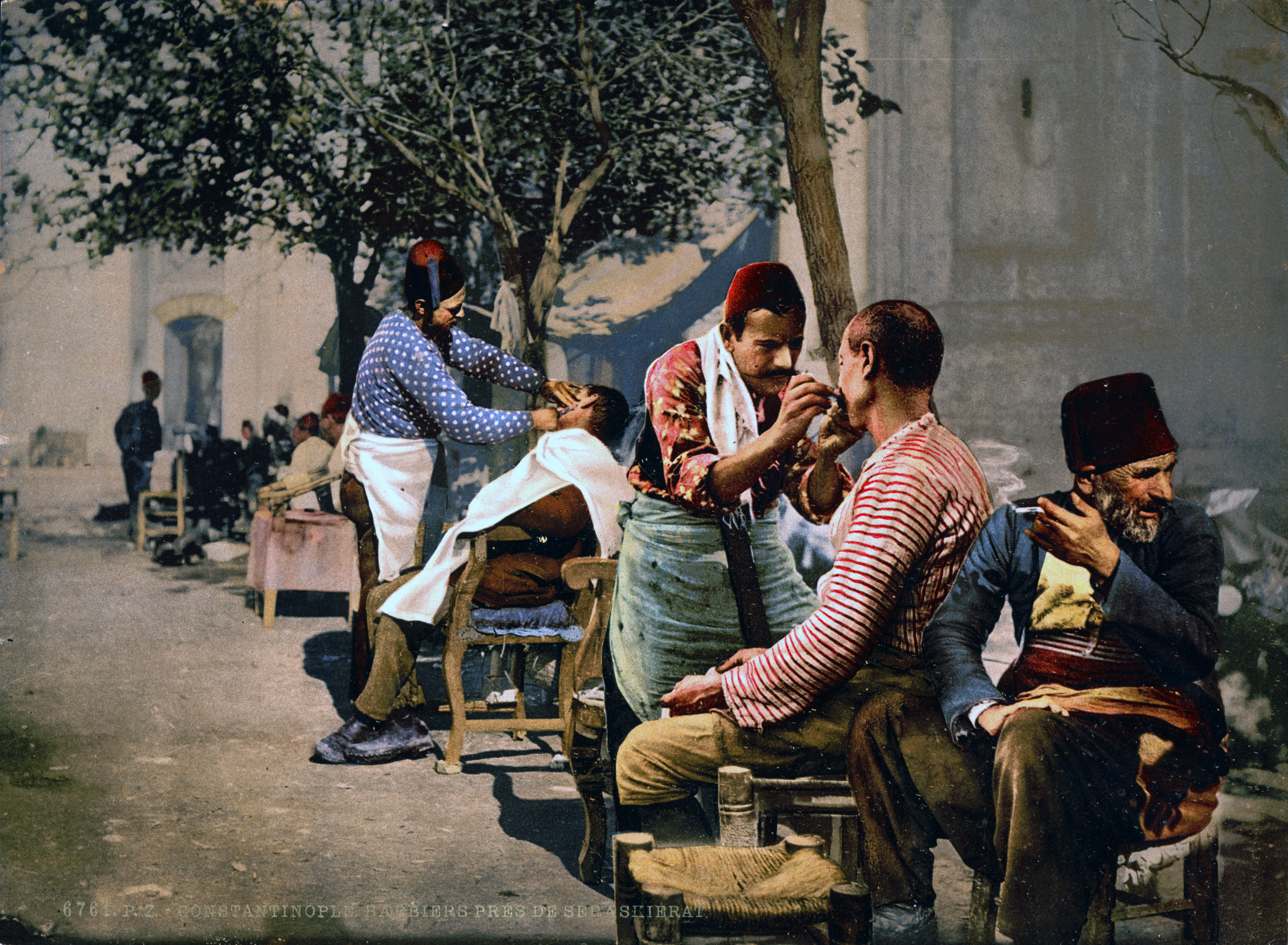
Barbers

In 1864, to avoid water pollution in the ancient Byzantine cisterns, the authorities evicted the residents of the suburban village of Belgrade. In the neighboring Belgrade Forest are four cisterns, two of which were built during the reign of Emperor Andronikos I Komnenos. Spring water is collected in them, which flows by gravity to a large cistern, from where it is supplied to the city via two aqueducts (one of which is called the Great Aqueduct of Justinian). During the reign of Abdulaziz, large fires continued to damage the city: in 1865, the fire raged in the Hocapaşa district, in 1870 — in Pera. In 1867, the reconstruction and partial reorganization of the Beyazıt Square began (near the Beyazıt Tower, monumental gates of the War Ministry appeared). In August 1867, Sultan Abdulaziz returned to Istanbul from a grand tour of Western and Central Europe. In 1871, in the Aksaray quarter, the Pertevniyal Valide Sultan Mosque was built (Yeni Valide Camii or Aksaray Mosque), known for its mixture of various styles. In the garden of the mosque, in a beautiful türbe, was buried Pertevniyal Sultan — the mother of Sultan Abdulaziz and the commissioner of the mosque's construction, who died in 1883.

On June 28, 1862, the first issue of the newspaper Tasvir-i Efkâr (Ideas' Illustration) was published in Istanbul, created by the writer Ibrahim Şinasi. This publication played a significant role in promoting advanced Western views and in the ideological formation of the first Turkish constitutionalists. In June 1865, in the Istanbul suburb of Yeniköy, the first meeting of the founders of the secret "Young Ottomans Society" took place, whose activities prepared the ground for the future constitution. In 1867, the society's leaders were forced to flee from Istanbul to Europe, where they published opposition newspapers, including the very popular Hürriyet (Freedom). In the same 1867, the capital's officials openly expressed their dissatisfaction with the authorities, some of whom had not received their salaries for six months.

In 1876, 13 newspapers were published in Istanbul in Turkish (including 7 daily), 9 in Greek, 9 in Armenian, 7 in French, 3 in Bulgarian, two each in English and Jewish, and one each in German and Arabic. In addition, during this period, Istanbul was a major center of book publishing, with dozens of state and private printing houses operating here, printing religious books, school textbooks, works of Arabic, Persian, and Turkish literature, as well as Turkish translations of European authors. In 1876, in the Pangalti quarter, the Russian St. Nicholas Hospital was built, attached to which a large Church of Saint Nicholas the Wonderworker was opened (it served as the parish church for a small Russian colony in Istanbul).

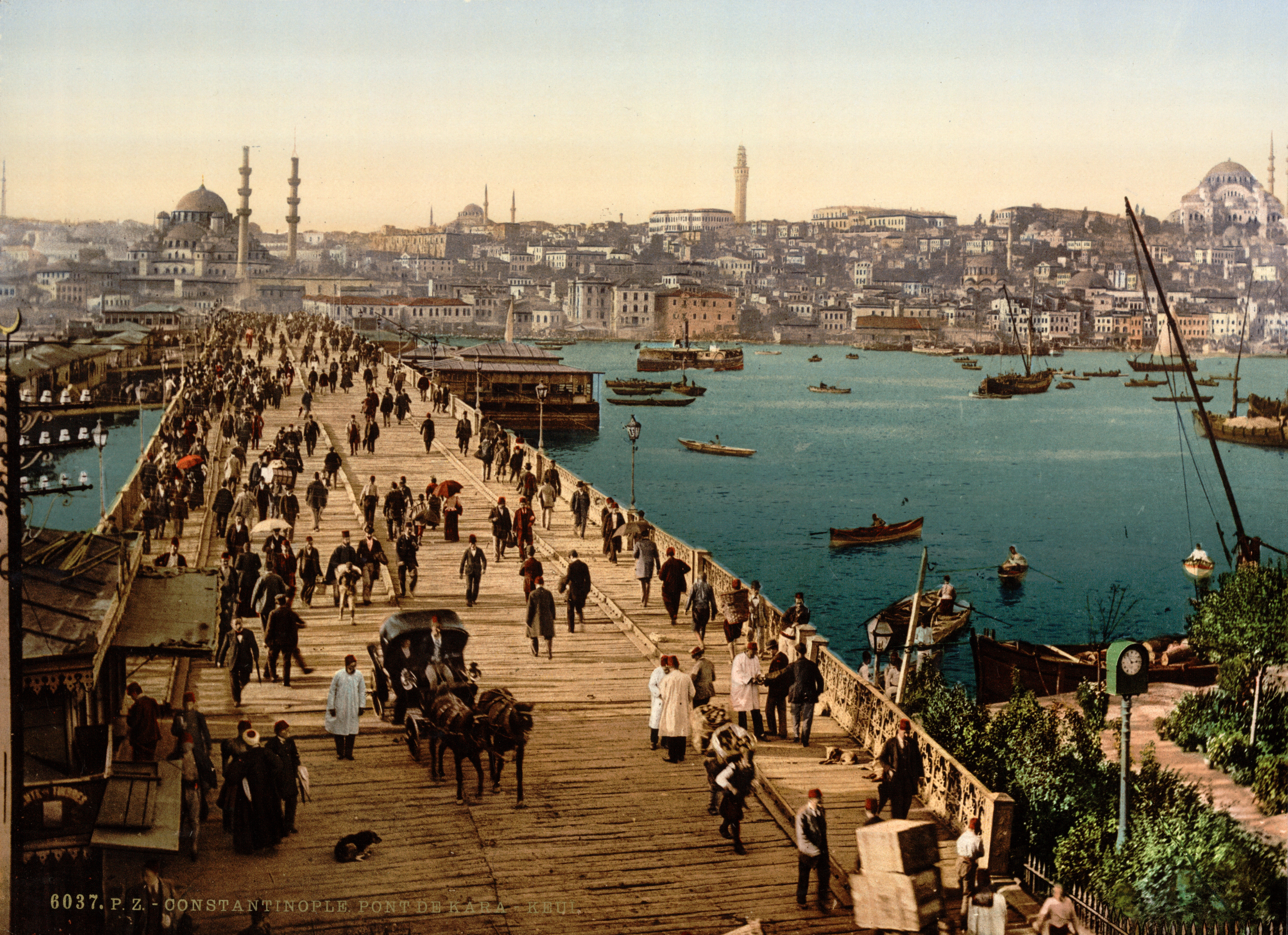
Galata Bridge

Since the beginning of the 1870s, the transport infrastructure of Istanbul began to develop rapidly. In January 1871, the first station in Istanbul opened in the Yedikule fortress area, connecting the city center by rail with the Küçükçekmece district. Also in 1871, four horse tram lines opened in Istanbul, and construction of the railway line Kadıköy — İzmit began; in 1872, the Haydarpaşa station opened on the Asian shore of the Bosphorus, and in August 1873, regular railway service began between the station and İzmit (in the Haydarpaşa area, goods arriving from the east by rail were transshipped to ships heading to the European part of the city). In the same 1873, a new terminal station on the Istanbul — Edirne line was built at the Golden Horn. On December 5, 1874, the Tünel began operating — a short underground funicular connecting Galata with Pera. In the summer of 1875, the Galata Bridge, 480 meters long and 14 meters wide, was thrown across the Golden Horn, connecting the two parts of the capital (the deck rested on 24 iron pontoons, four of which could be parted for the passage of small vessels). But while the old Muslim Istanbul remained an exotic Eastern city, striking changes occurred in Galata and Pera. These districts were built up with embassies and offices of European companies, expensive hotels, shops, cafes, clubs, and restaurants; here the most fashionable clothing and shoes, watches and jewelry, perfumes and haberdashery, dishes and furniture, hunting accessories and toys, optical instruments and cameras, bronze figurines, medicines, and all sorts of accessories were sold (here the first department stores and European-style shopping arcades also appeared). Foreign ships stopped entering the Golden Horn harbor, unloading their goods directly on the Galata quay.

After three grandiose fires that raged in Istanbul (in 1856 in Aksaray, in 1865 in Hocapaşa, and in 1870 in Pera), the capital's appearance changed significantly — the authorities, with the participation of European specialists, laid wide highways connecting busy squares and preventing the spread of fire, introduced new standards for the appearance of neighborhoods and the construction of residential, administrative, and religious buildings. In the mid-1870s, the situation in Istanbul was heated to the extreme. The economic and political crisis led to a sharp deterioration in the well-being of most of the population. In the fall of 1875, the Porte announced its partial financial bankruptcy, which led to an increase in taxes and a reduction in officials' salaries. Soon, anti-government sentiments engulfed all strata of the capital's population. In this atmosphere, supporters of the "Young Ottomans" became active, rallying around their leader Midhat Pasha. Constitutional ideas found wide dissemination even among the Muslim clergy and softas — madrasa students (at that time, there were about 40 thousand softas in Istanbul, most of whom came from poor families).

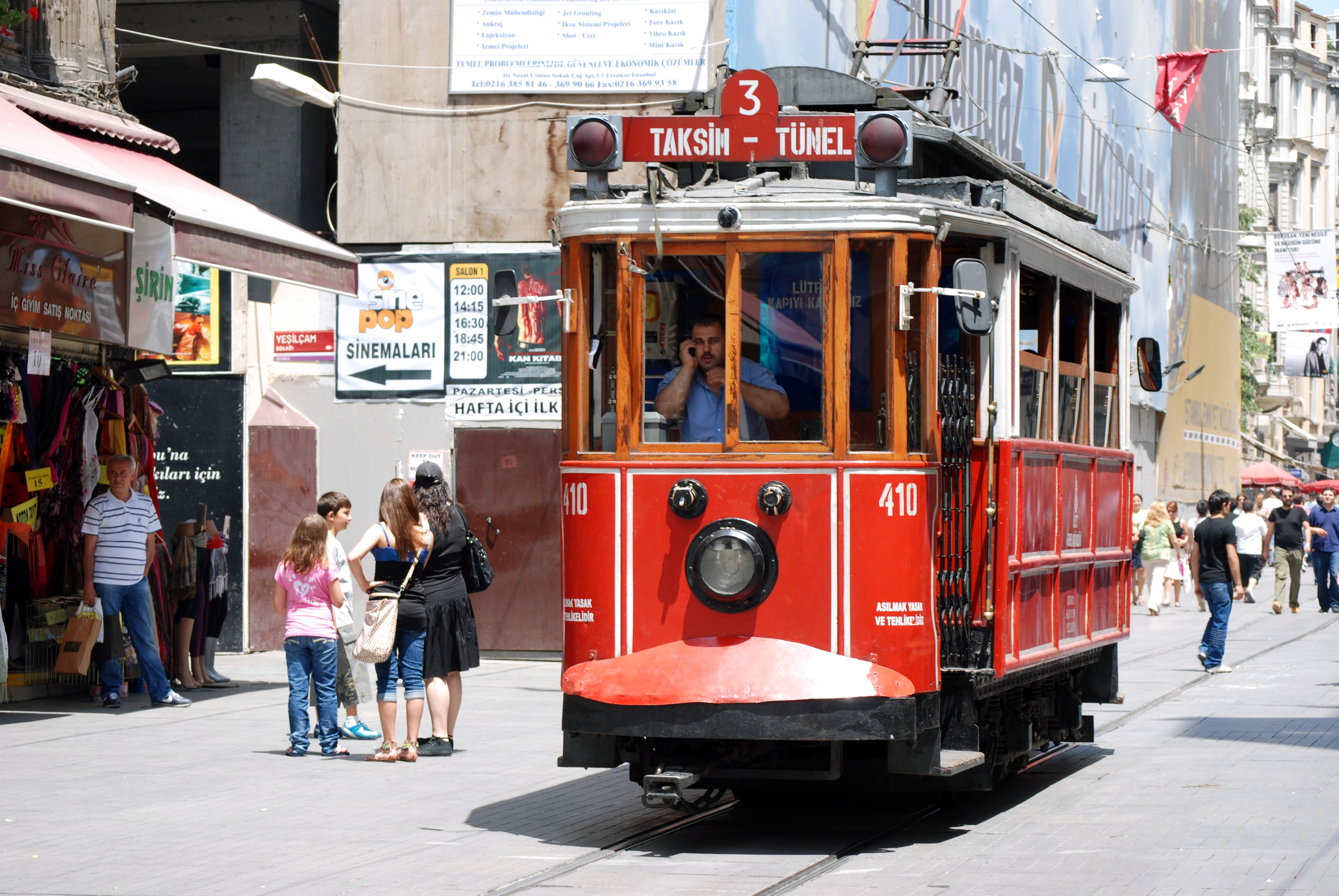
Istanbul tramway

In April 1876, mass demonstrations by workers of the mint, army and naval arsenals took place in Istanbul, demanding immediate payment of salaries. From the beginning of May 1876, crowds of softas gathered daily in the courtyards of mosques and held anti-government rallies. In addition, many of them armed themselves with rifles and pistols. On May 9, madrasa students at the Fatih Mosque organized a rally, gathering more than 5 thousand softas from different madrasas on Beyazıt Square. Through the arriving war minister, the softas conveyed to the sultan a demand to dismiss the grand vizier and the sheikh ul-Islam. The next day, demonstrators gathered on Fatih Square were joined by madrasa students from the Fatih, Beyazıt, and Süleymaniye mosques, as well as numerous townspeople. A large crowd moved to the Sublime Porte building, rejecting the sultan's offer to sit down at the negotiating table.

On May 11, 1876, the sultan was forced to replace the grand vizier, the sheikh ul-Islam, and a number of ministers, and Midhat Pasha entered the new cabinet as a minister without portfolio. But the softas continued the demonstrations, demanding reforms. On the night of May 29–30, cadets of the military school and parts of the Istanbul garrison troops, on the orders of a group of ministers, surrounded the Dolmabahçe Palace from the land side. From the sea, the palace was blocked by the ironclad Mahmudiye that supported the conspirators. Sultan Abdulaziz was deposed, and the throne was ascended by Murad V, known for his liberal views, son of the late Sultan Abdulmejid I. Abdulaziz was imprisoned in the Çırağan Palace, where he was killed a few days later (buried in the türbe of Mahmud II).

== Murad V's era ==
For several months after the coup, Istanbul was the arena of fierce political struggle between supporters and opponents of the constitution. Often, during this struggle, the warring parties resorted to murdering their rivals. Despite such an unsettled atmosphere, in Pera, with the money of the banker of Greek origin Christakis Zographos, the luxurious gallery "Cité de Péra" was built, famous for its cafés, restaurants, and wine shops (in 1844, the Naum Theatre opened on this site, but it was severely damaged during the fire in Pera in 1870 and soon demolished). On August 31, 1876, instead of Murad V, who was found to have a severe nervous system disorder, his younger brother Abdul Hamid II ascended the throne. The deposed sultan was confined to the Çırağan Palace, where he died in August 1904 (Murad V was buried near the grave of his mother Şevkefza Sultan at the New Mosque).

== Abdul Hamid II's era ==
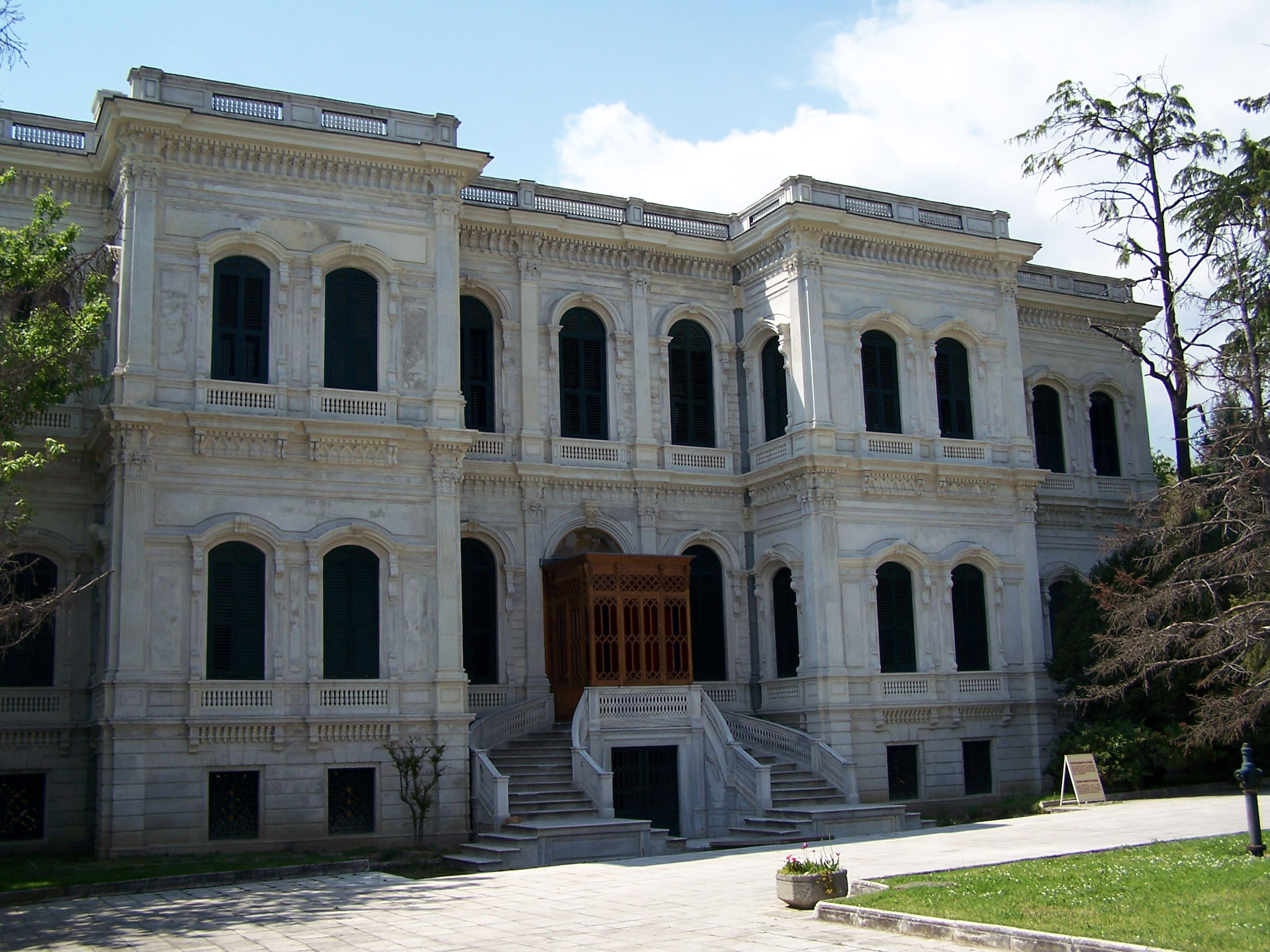
Yıldız

On December 19, 1876, Abdul Hamid II nevertheless appointed the leader of the constitutionalists, Midhat Pasha, as grand vizier. On December 23, on the square in front of the Sublime Porte building, the ceremony of proclaiming the first Turkish constitution took place. The sultan's first secretary, Said Bey, handed the vizier the sultan's decree on the proclamation of the constitution and its text, while the chief secretary of the government, Mahmud Celaleddin, read these documents. After Midhat Pasha's speech thanking the sultan, a prayer was said for the monarch's health, followed by a salute of 101 guns, announcing the transformation of the Ottoman Empire into a constitutional monarchy. On the same day, the Constantinople Conference began its work in the Tersane Palace in Istanbul. Already in February 1877, Abdul Hamid II dismissed Midhat from the post of grand vizier, exiled him from the empire, and began the struggle against the constitutionalists. In 1877–1878, two sessions of the first Turkish parliament took place in Istanbul, which was dissolved by the sultan in February 1878 for an indefinite period. From this period began the thirty-year "era of zulüm" (oppression). An atmosphere of constant fear of denunciations and repressions by political secret police was established in the capital. On March 3, 1878, in the suburb of San Stefano, the Treaty of San Stefano peace treaty was signed between the Ottoman Empire and Russia, ending the last Russo-Turkish War (as a result of which the Turks lost almost all their possessions in Europe). On May 20, 1878, rebels captured the Çırağan Palace with the aim of restoring the deposed Murad V to the throne, but they were soon dispersed by troops.

Istanbul continued to remain the largest economic center of the Ottoman Empire. The old guilds played a significant role in the city's trade and craft life. However, they no longer regulated production, but continued to maintain control over the work of numerous artisans. Guild associations turned into a serious obstacle to the development of modern industrial production and the technical re-equipment of enterprises. Despite this, several steam mills operated in Istanbul (the first of them was built back in 1840), foundries and metalworking enterprises, sawmills, cotton, silk weaving, and cloth factories, tanneries, dyeing and soap factories, ship repair yards, as well as state military industry enterprises producing cannons, rifles, ammunition, and uniforms (in the Tophane artillery arsenal alone, 3.5 thousand people worked). Against the background of the economic crisis, huge funds went to the maintenance of the army, reformed with the help of foreign specialists (especially Goltz Pasha). Soon, Turkish officers who had graduated from new military schools became one of the most enlightened people in the empire.

At the turn of the 19th–20th centuries, more than a third of the empire's entire import and a significant part of its export passed through the Istanbul customs district. About 15 thousand ships entered the port of Istanbul annually, and its cargo turnover many times exceeded the cargo turnover of such major ports as İzmir or Trabzon. Numerous foreign banks and trading firms, as well as foreign concession enterprises (including grain trading and tobacco ones), operated in the city. In 1881, the Administration of the Ottoman Public Debt opened in Istanbul, which took control of the collection of many state taxes and duties to ensure payments on numerous foreign loans to the sultan's government (this organization, practically independent of the sultan's will, almost completely subordinated the finances of the decrepit Ottoman Empire to the European states). Despite the acute deficit of the Ottoman budget, Sultan Abdul Hamid II moved from the Dolmabahçe Palace to the new residence Yıldız Palace ("Star Palace"), designed by an Italian architect on the slope of a hill next to the Çırağan Palace (the complex included a huge park, the sultan's palace, harem villas, servants' quarters, kitchens, guards, and stables).

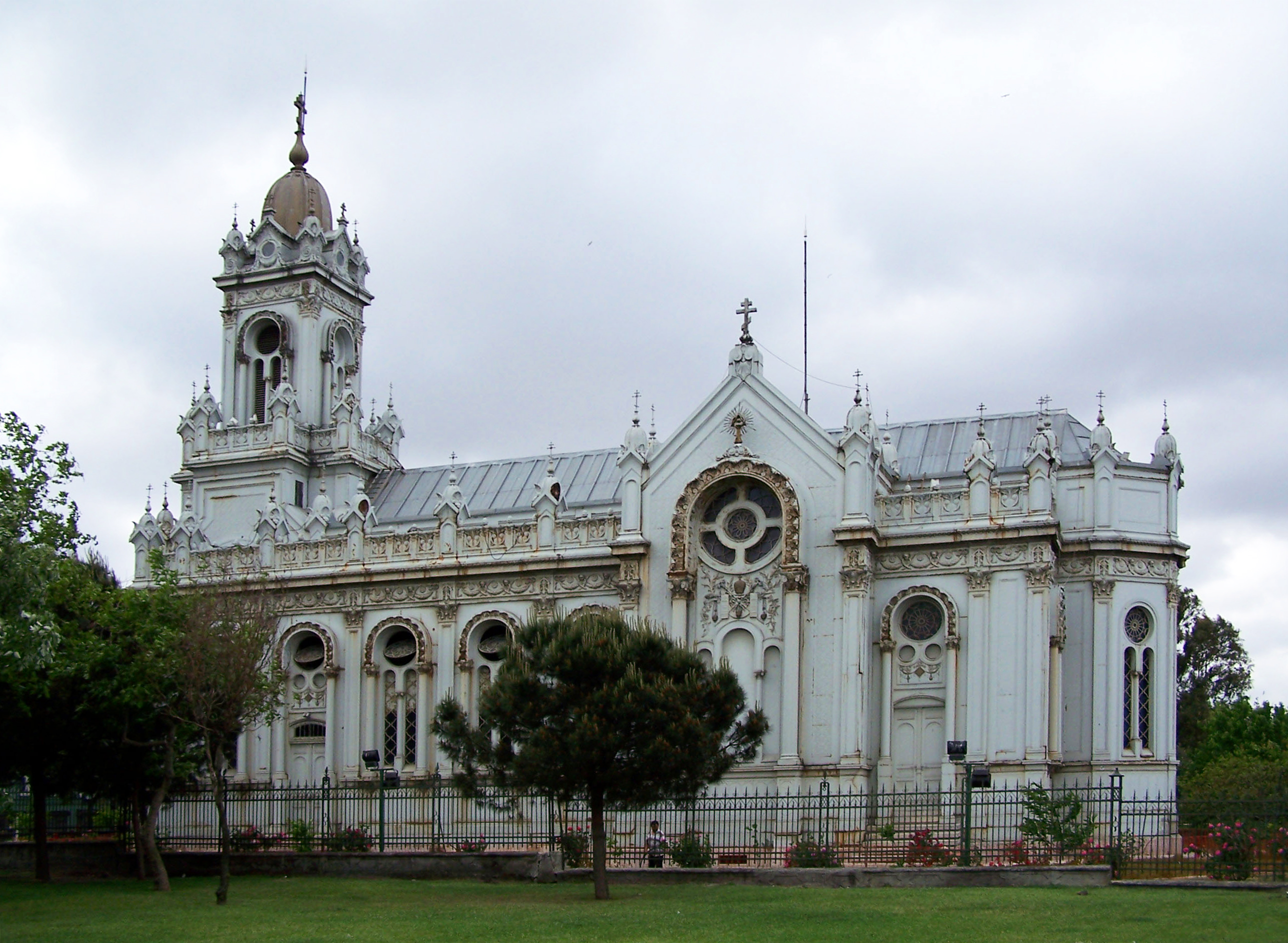
Church of St. Stephen

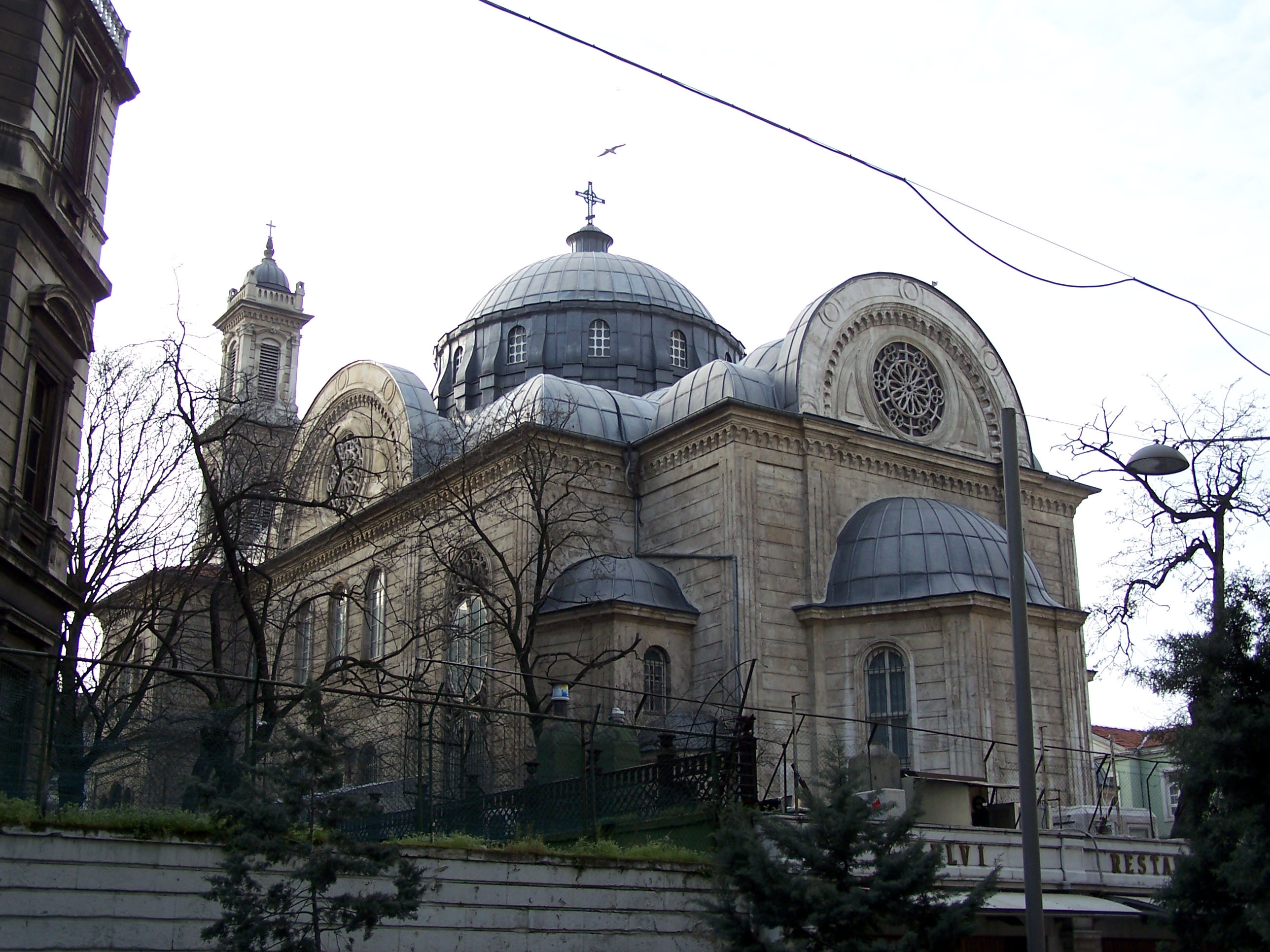
Church of the Holy Trinity

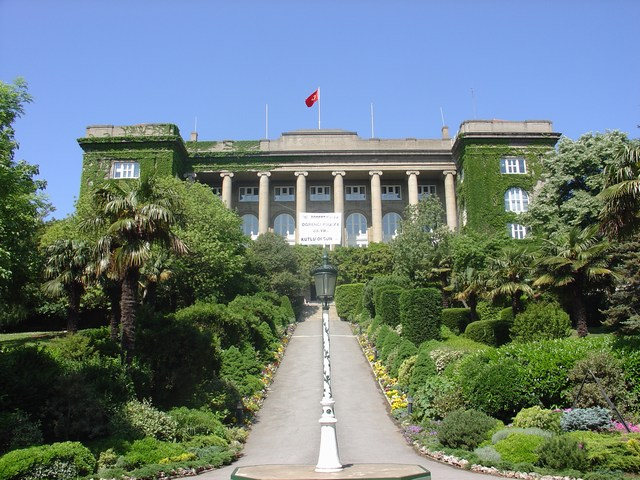
Robert College

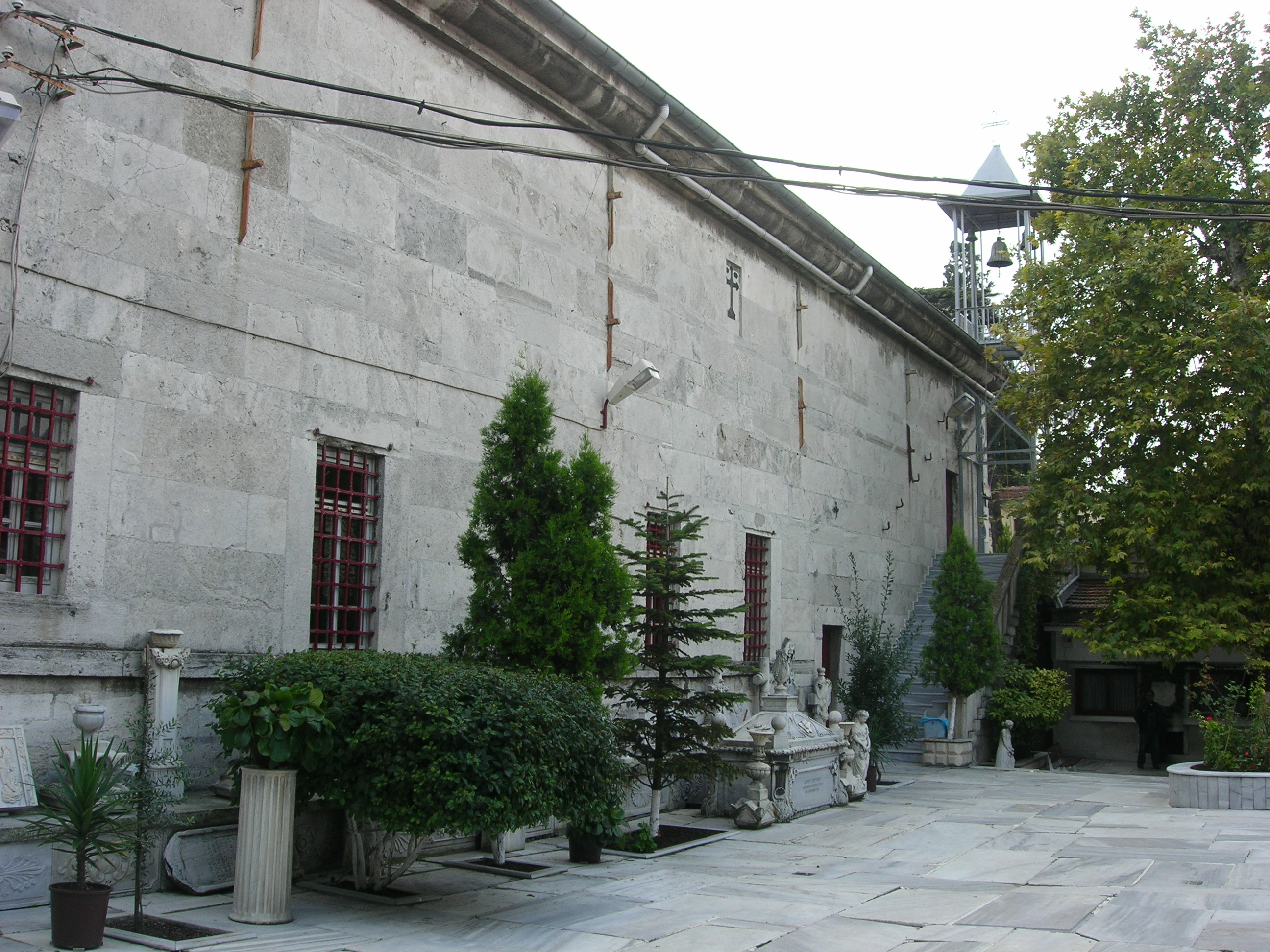
Church of the Life-Giving Spring

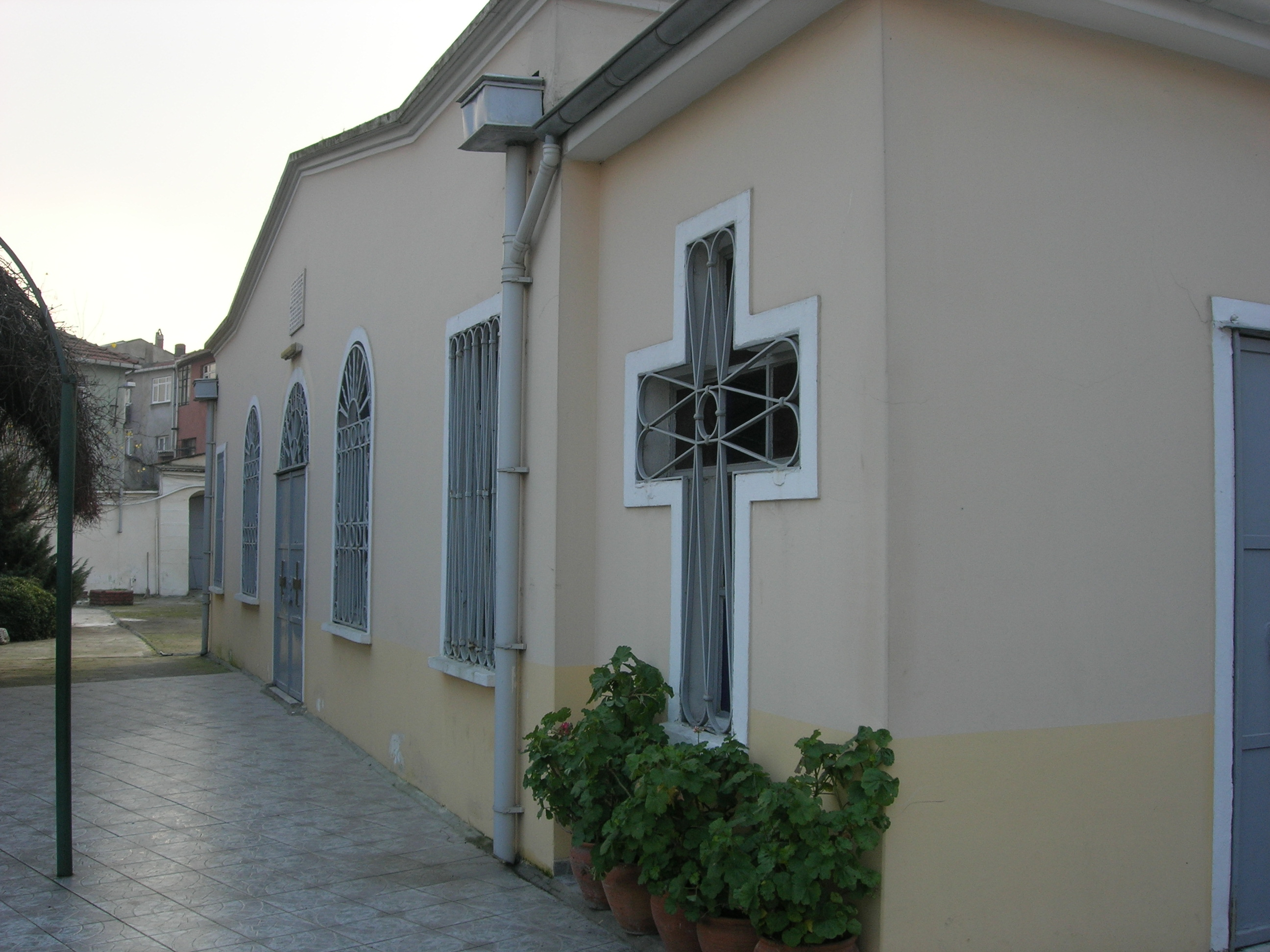
Blachernae Church

In the fall of 1880, the largest Greek Church of the Holy Trinity in the Neo-Baroque style was opened in Pera. In the summer of 1881, a trial took place in Istanbul in which the previously arrested Midhat Pasha was found guilty of organizing the murder of Sultan Abdulaziz (the former grand vizier was sentenced to death, which, at the request of the British, was commuted to life imprisonment, but in 1884 Midhat Pasha was killed by guards in an Arabian prison). In 1887, in Samatya, on the ruins of an ancient Byzantine monastery and a later Armenian patriarchal complex destroyed by fire, the Armenian Church of St. George was built. In 1888, German capital under the leadership of German bank won the concession to complete the İzmit–Ankara railway, which was planned as part of the Baghdad Railway. In May 1890, the Sirkeci station was opened at the site of the old station at the Golden Horn, intended for passengers of the Orient Express (it was built to the design of a German architect in the Orientalist style and had a number of innovations — central heating and gas lighting). In 1892, the luxurious Pera Palace Hotel was built in Pera specifically for passengers of the Orient Express, and in 1893, not far from it — the Hotel Bristol. In December 1892, regular railway service began between Istanbul (Haydarpaşa station) and Ankara. In 1899, the Haydarpaşa station and the adjacent port facilities were expanded, which allowed increasing the transshipment of Anatolian grain through the Bosphorus.

In 1885, the capital had about 850 thousand people. 44% of Istanbul's population were Muslims (predominantly Turks), 17.5% — Orthodox Greeks, 17% — Armenians, 5% — Jews, 1.2% — Catholics, 0.5% — Bulgarians, and 0.1% — Protestants (14.7% of the capital's residents were foreigners). In Pera, Galata, and Tophane, 47% of the population were foreigners, 32% — "infidel" subjects of the empire, and only 21% — Muslims (they concentrated in Tophane and Fındıklı). In the neighboring districts of Kasımpaşa and Sütlüce, Muslims predominated, and a large Jewish community lived in the Hasköy district. In Beşiktaş and the villages along the Bosphorus to Rumelihisarı, Muslims made up 43%, and foreigners — 10% (there were also large communities of Greeks, Armenians, and Jews). In the quarters of old Istanbul, Muslims made up 55% of the total population (here foreigners and "infidels" concentrated along the southern shore of the Golden Horn and in the quarters along the Sea of Marmara). Outside these zones, the Muslim population concentrated in traditional Turkish districts — Eyüp (at the Golden Horn), Yedikule, Bakırköy, and Yeşilköy (at the Sea of Marmara). In Üsküdar and Kadıköy, Muslims predominated, but significant communities of Greeks, Armenians, and Jews also lived there. In the second half of the 19th century and the first decade of the 20th century, the districts of Taksim (Petit Champ), Harbiye, Şişli, Teşvikiye, Nişantaşı, Pangaltı, Kurtuluş (Tatavla), Tophane, Dolmabahçe, Beşiktaş, and Kabataş grew especially rapidly (the growth vector went northeast from Galata and Pera along the Bosphorus coast).

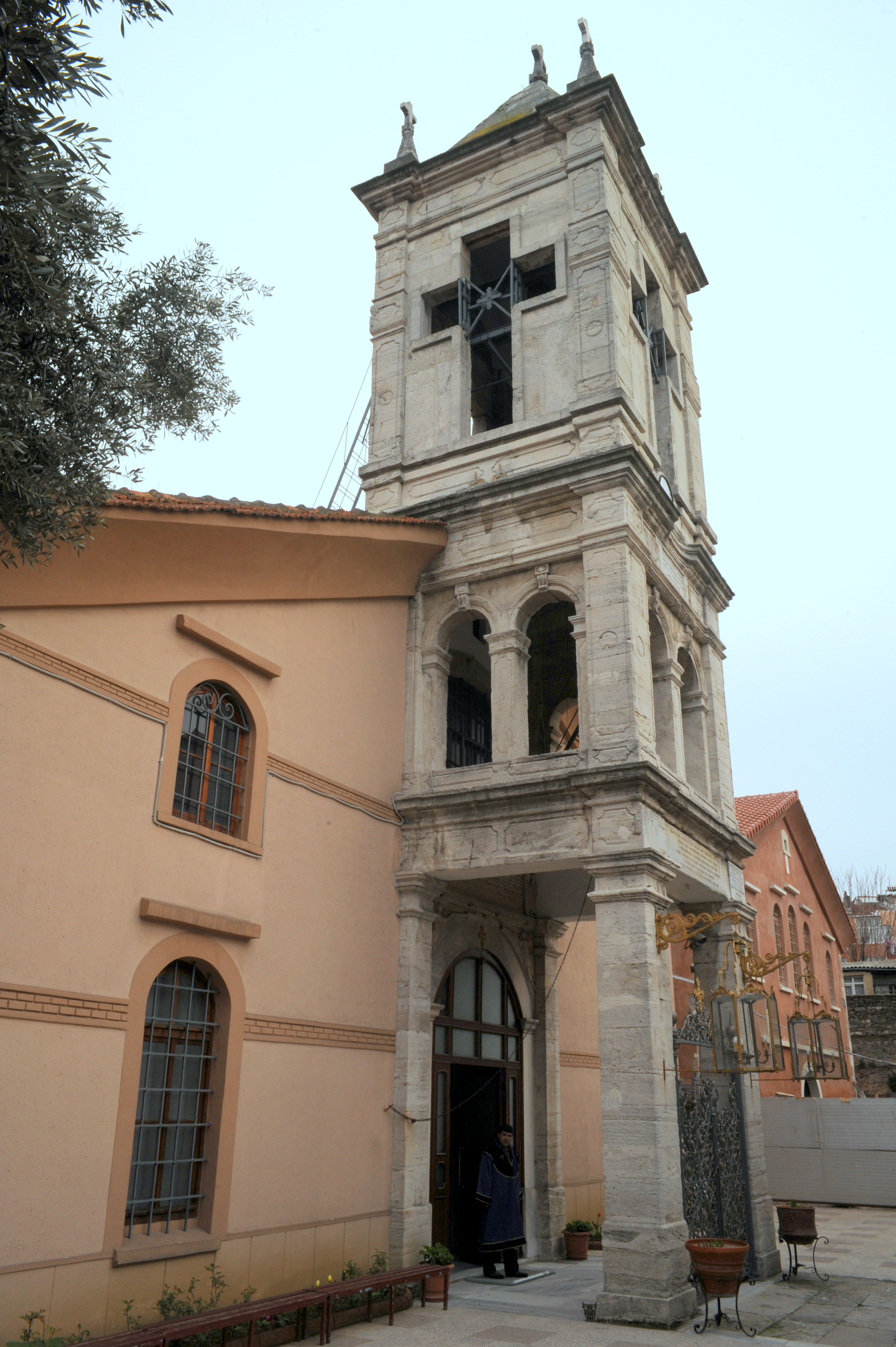
Cathedral of the Virgin Mary

In the 19th century, the Western Armenian language formed, based on the idioms of the Armenian diaspora in Istanbul. It was spoken by numerous writers, journalists, scientists, priests, and other intellectuals living in the capital of the Ottoman Empire (including Mkrtich I Khrimian, Daniel Varuzhan, and Siamanto). In Istanbul, Armenians enjoyed significant privileges; they organized their separate millets under the patronage of the patriarch and had some communal self-government. The majority of civil service and banking employees came from Greeks and Armenians. They had a higher cultural level, good prosperity, and education, which caused envy among the clumsy Turkish peasants settling in the city and less fortunate merchants.

In the fall of 1895, massacres of Armenians occurred in Istanbul. Armenian revolutionaries responded with the capture of the Ottoman Bank in Istanbul and an appeal for help to the European powers (August 26, 1896). This became the signal for a new massacre, during which about 6 thousand Armenians died in several districts of Istanbul. The bodies of the killed were transported to barges and drowned in the sea on the orders of the sultan. Most Western countries, especially Britain, severely condemned this crime, but the German Kaiser Wilhelm II paid a visit to Istanbul and even publicly embraced the sultan.

In 1889, the first cell of the secret organization "Committee of Union and Progress" emerged within the walls of the military medical school, which led the struggle to restore the constitution. In the 1890s, the Young Turk underground in Istanbul was crushed, but in emigration, opposition leaders continued to publish newspapers and pamphlets secretly delivered to the capital. In 1892, next to the Topkapı Palace, the main building of the Archaeological Museum was built, created at the initiative of the prominent scholar Osman Hamdi Bey (in the early 20th century, two wings were added to the main museum building, and the complex acquired its current appearance). The real decoration of the new museum was the Alexander Sarcophagus or Sarcophagus of Alexander the Great, found in 1887. In September 1898, near the embankment of the Fener district, on the site of an old wooden church, with the active participation of the exarch Iosif I, the iron Bulgarian Church of St. Stephen was built. In the same 1898, in the suburb of San Stefano, a large Orthodox church was built to the design of architect Vladimir Suslov, in whose crypt the remains of 20 thousand Russian soldiers who died in the Russo-Turkish War of 1877–1878 were buried. In 1900, the Sultan University opened in Istanbul with three faculties — theological, literary, and technical. In 1901, on the outskirts of the former hippodrome, the German Fountain was opened, presented to the sultan by the German Empire in memory of the second visit of Kaiser Wilhelm II, who visited Istanbul in 1898. In 1904, the last Ottoman valide sultan — adoptive mother of Abdul Hamid II, Perestû Kadınefendi — died (buried in the türbe at the Mihrimah Valide Sultan complex).

In July 1905, Armenian Dashnak conspirators made an unsuccessful attempt on Sultan Abdul Hamid II, exploding a bomb at the Yıldız Palace mosque. In July 1908, under pressure from military units loyal to the Young Turks, the sultan restored the constitution, and in August, sultanic decrees on holding parliamentary elections and on the inviolability of citizens' homes were published in Istanbul. Almost immediately, porters, workers of a number of factories and plants, railway workers, and urban transport workers went on strike in the capital, demanding improved working conditions and higher wages. After the abolition of the terrifying secret police and the lifting of censorship, new clubs, societies, newspapers, public-political and scientific organizations emerged one after another in Istanbul. The Young Turks achieved a significant reduction in court expenses, deprived the sultan of almost all adjutants and horses, sharply reduced the staff of court servants, and abolished the court orchestra and the palace dramatic troupe consisting of Italian actors.

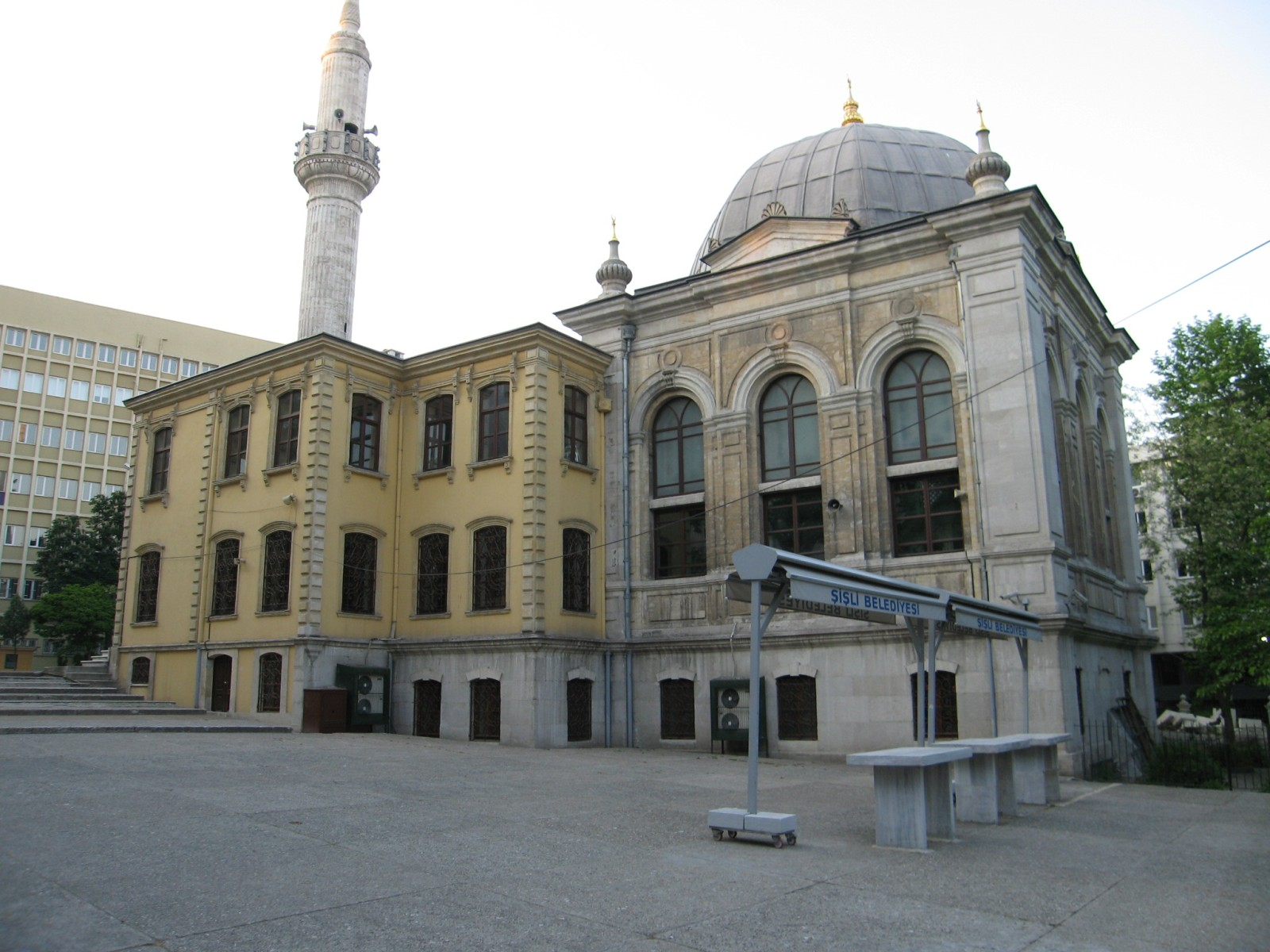
Teşvikiye Mosque

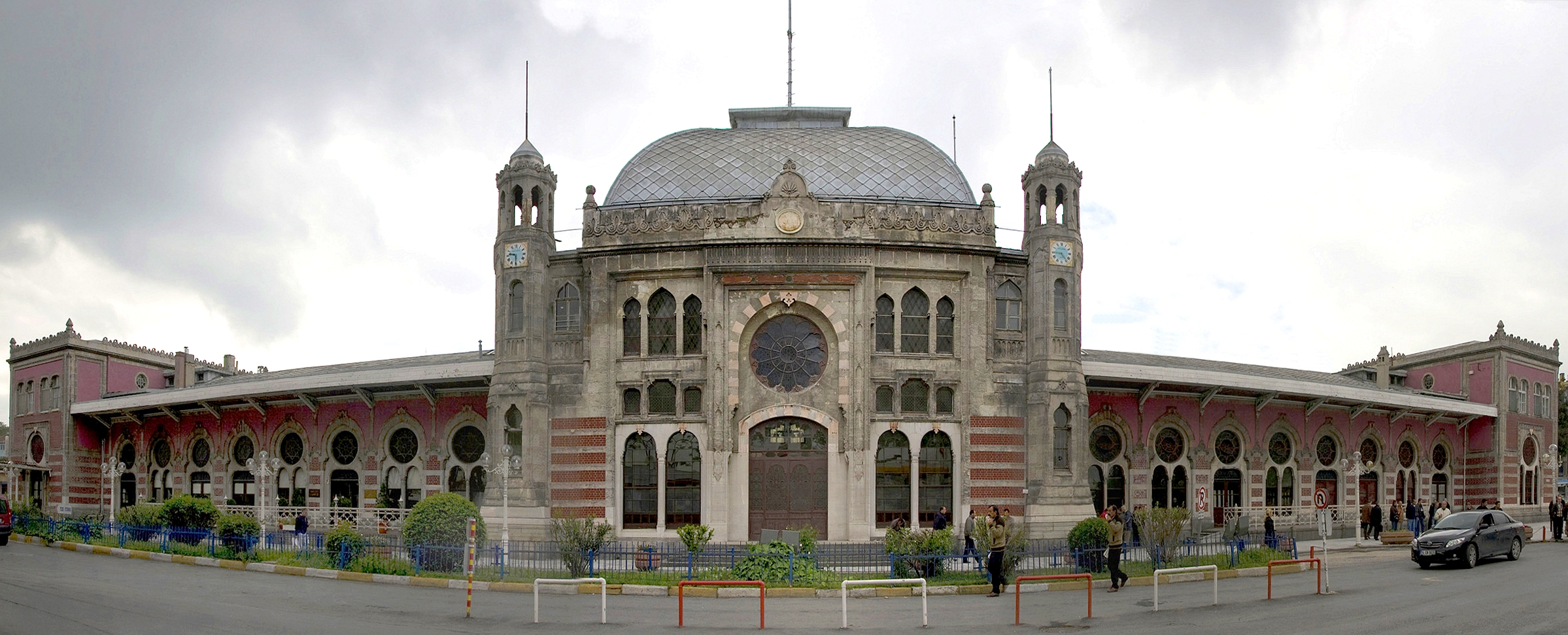
Sirkeci railway station

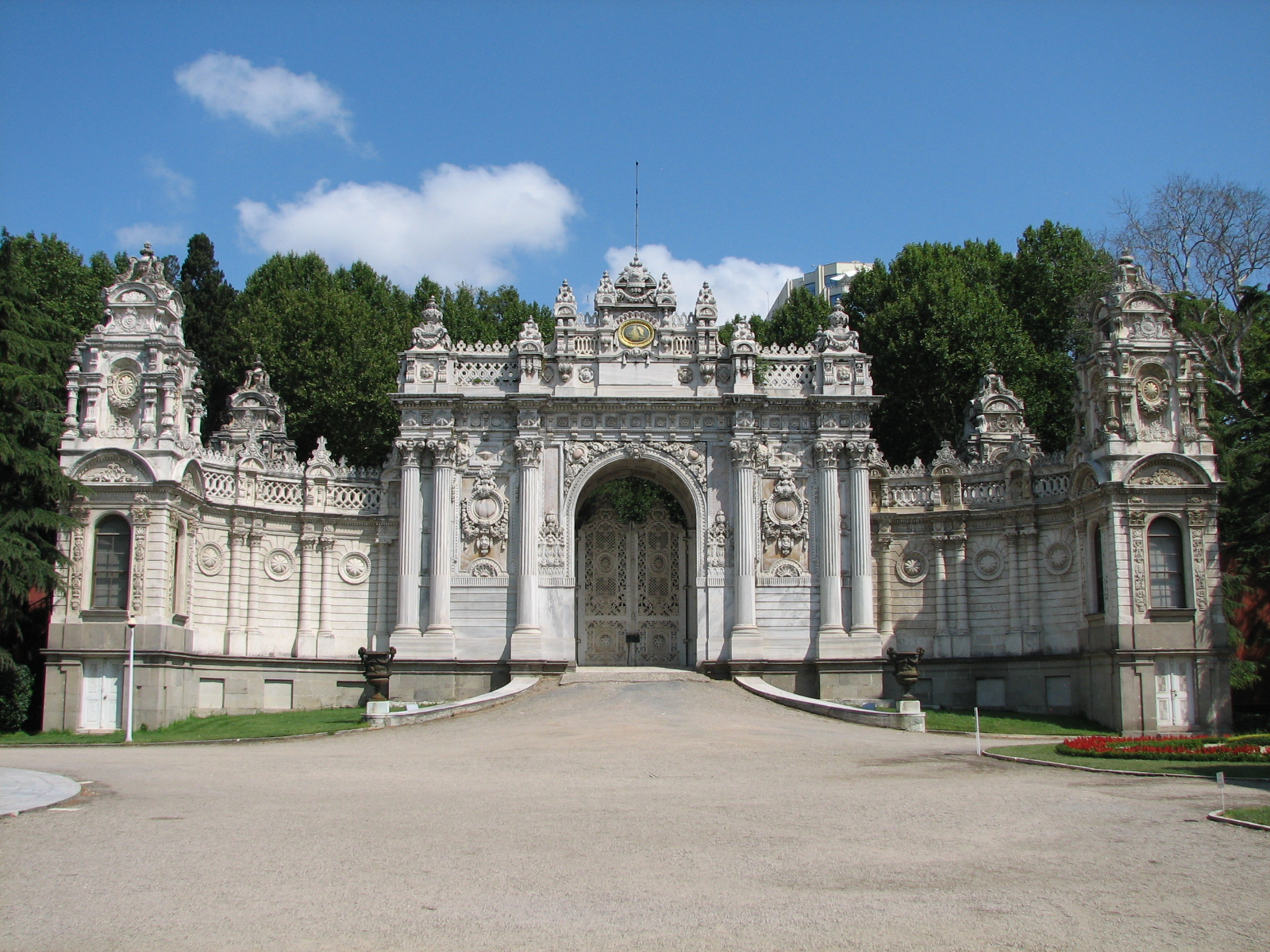
Dolmabahçe Gates

On November 15, 1908, the parliament reconvened in Istanbul, chaired by one of the Young Turk leaders, Ahmed Rıza Bey, who returned to the capital after two decades of life in emigration. Almost immediately, a struggle began in the parliament between the right wing, reflecting the interests of feudal-clerical circles, and the Young Turks, among whom chauvinistic elements also became active. On April 10, 1909, more than 60 thousand people took part in the funeral procession following the coffin with the body of the famous journalist and editor of the newspaper Hürriyet, Fehmi Bey. He opposed the reactionary policy of the Young Turks and was killed by an unknown officer with a revolver shot on the Galata Bridge.

In the morning of April 13, parts of the capital garrison mutinied against the rule of the Young Turks. 30 thousand soldiers and officers gathered on the square in front of the Hagia Sophia mosque. They were supported by many townspeople and Muslim priests dissatisfied with the new government (within a few hours, the number of rebels reached 100 thousand people). On the orders of the sultan and his entourage, officers loyal to the Young Turks were arrested or killed, premises of the Committee of Union and Progress organization and newspaper editorial offices supporting the Young Turks were destroyed. Along the way, soldiers carried out mass robberies and looting. The Young Turk leaders fled to Salonica, some of them sailed on a Russian steamer to Odesa. As soon as the rebels returned to the barracks, the sultan issued a decree on the amnesty of all participants in the anti-government uprising and appointed a new cabinet of ministers consisting of his supporters.

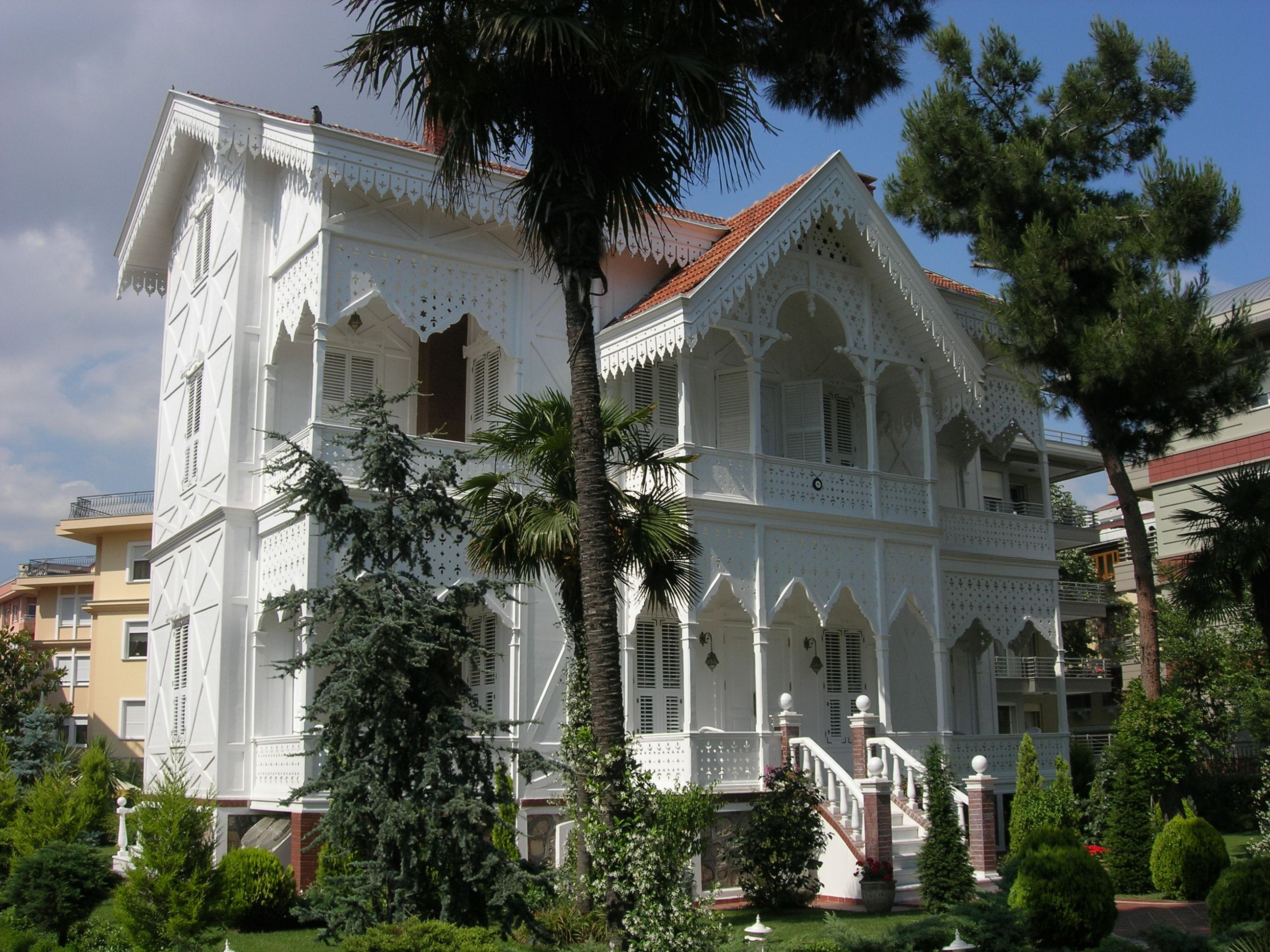
San Stefano

On April 16, 1909, the 100-thousand-strong "Army of Action" formed in Salonica from units loyal to the Young Turks of the 3rd Army Corps moved on Istanbul. On April 18, the vanguard units of the Young Turks occupied the Küçükçekmece and Yeşilköy (San Stefano) railway stations, and on April 22, the "Army of Action" under the command of Mahmud Shevket Pasha approached the city walls. Panic began in Istanbul, opponents of the Young Turks hastily fled the city on warships. On April 23, in the capital, with a huge crowd of people, another selamlık (solemn Friday ceremony of the sultan's procession to the mosque) took place, while at this time the "Army of Action" began the assault on Istanbul. On April 24, a decisive battle took place; by evening, the attackers captured the city's largest barracks, suppressed the last pockets of resistance with artillery fire, and surrounded the Yıldız Palace, cutting it off from all communications.

Istanbul was again under the control of the Young Turks. On April 27, 1909, Abdul Hamid II was deposed and sent under escort to Salonica. Many participants in the counter-revolutionary mutiny were executed on the squares of the capital. After Salonica was captured by the Greeks, Abdul Hamid was brought back to Istanbul and placed under guard in the Beylerbeyi Palace. The deposed sultan died in February 1918 and was buried in the türbe of Mahmud II.

== Mehmed V's era ==
The Young Turks enthroned the decrepit and weak-willed Mehmed V, leaving him only the formal right to appoint the grand vizier and the sheikh ul-Islam. In August 1909, the Young Turks passed an anti-labor law on strikes through parliament. In November 1909, the official opening of the new Haydarpaşa station took place, built to the design of German architects on land reclaimed from the sea. In January 1910, the Çırağan Palace burned down, in which shortly before the sultan had allowed sessions of the Ottoman parliament to be held. In September 1910, the Ottoman Socialist Party was created in Istanbul, hostile to the Young Turks. In response, they closed socialist clubs; in December 1910, they closed the party's newspaper and exiled the most active socialist leaders from the city. On May 1, 1911, Istanbul workers celebrated the International Workers' Day for the first time. In February 1912, in Pera, the opening of the Catholic Church of St. Anthony of Padua took place, which became the main church for the Italian community of the capital. On April 27, 1912, in a solemn setting, the new two-tier Galata Bridge was opened, built by a German company from steel structures (its length was 467 m, width — 95 m, height from water level to roadway — 5.5 m). Also in this year, a number of trade union organizations emerged in the capital, and a workers' club was created. In the same 1912, a large fire occurred on Sultanahmet Square, destroying hundreds of houses. During the clearing of the fire site, the inner courtyard of the Great Imperial Palace with magnificent mosaics from the time of Justinian was discovered. In November 1912, Bulgarian troops approached very close to Istanbul but were stopped at the Battle of Çatalca.

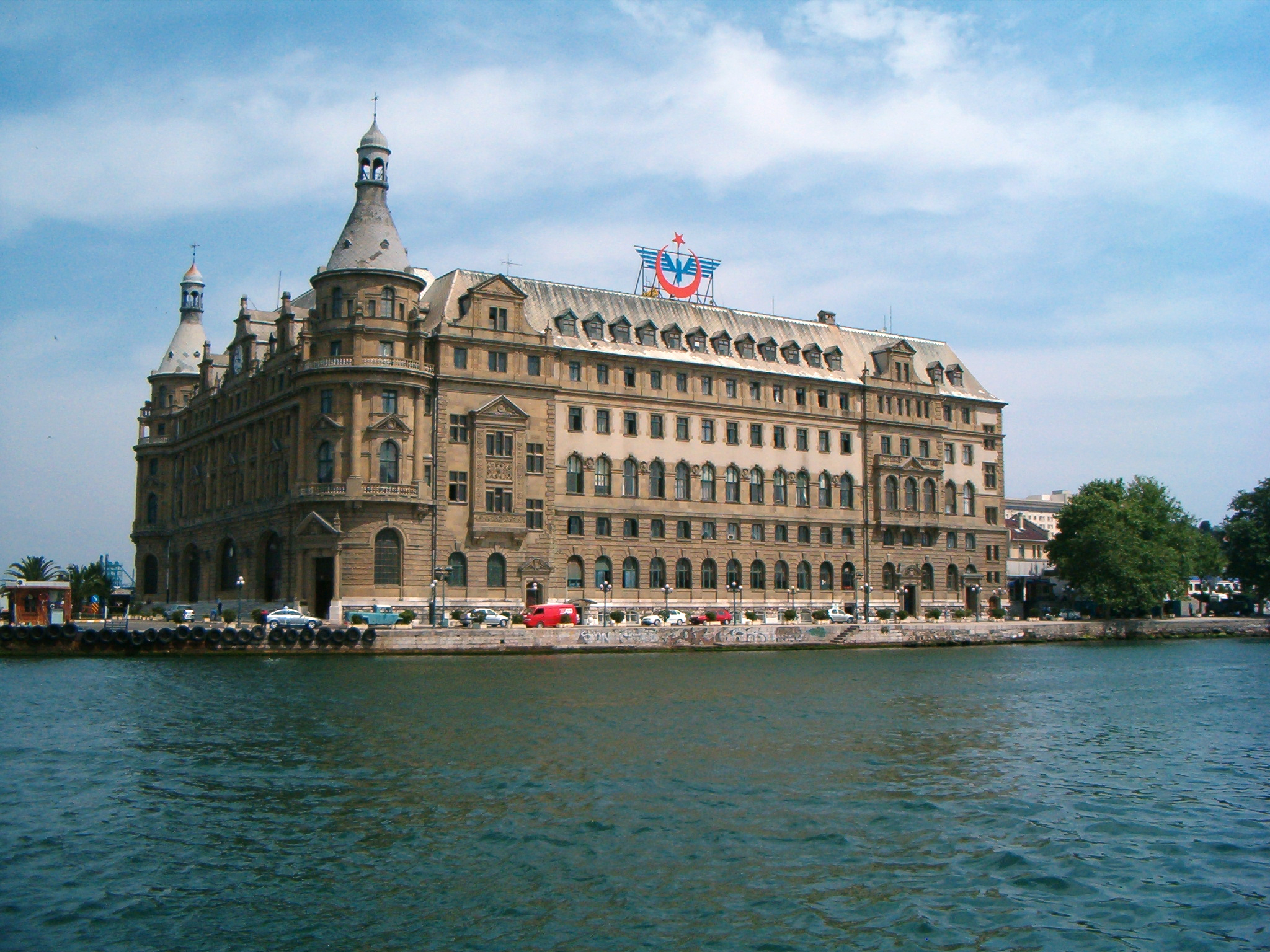
Haydarpaşa station

On January 23, 1913, a state coup took place in Istanbul, carried out by a group of officers under the command of the famous Young Turk figures Talaat Pasha and Enver Pasha. About 200 officers burst into the government building, where the next cabinet meeting was taking place, killed the war minister Nazım Pasha and his adjutants, arrested the grand vizier Kâmil Pasha and several ministers. In response, opponents of the Young Turks killed Grand Vizier Shevket Pasha in his car in June, who was heading from the war ministry to the government building. After this, the Young Turks banned all opposition parties and trade unions, arrested hundreds of major political and public figures. At the end of 1913, a Young Turk military dictatorship was established in the country, headed by the "triumvirate" — war minister Enver Pasha, interior minister Talaat Pasha, and naval minister, military governor of Istanbul Djemal Pasha.

The influence of Kaiser Germany sharply increased in the empire. Enver Pasha surrounded himself with German military advisors, and the German military mission that arrived in Istanbul, headed by General Liman von Sanders, effectively took control of the Ottoman armed forces. In February 1914, the Istanbul tramway was electrified (previously, all horses serving the horse tram were confiscated for army needs). Having drawn Turkey into the First World War as an ally of Germany, the Young Turks further deteriorated the country's economic situation. In Istanbul, prices constantly rose, speculation in food products, drinking water, clothing, firewood, and coal flourished, a significant part of the townspeople starved. Crowds of refugees from war-torn places flowed into Istanbul, causing a sharp increase in housing rental prices. Diseases and epidemics raged in the city, there was a shortage of medicines, many hospitals closed due to the lack of doctors and medicines. The dictatorship, taking advantage of wartime conditions, brutally suppressed any manifestations of opposition sentiments, expelled the undesirable from the capital, and physically eliminated the "unreliable".

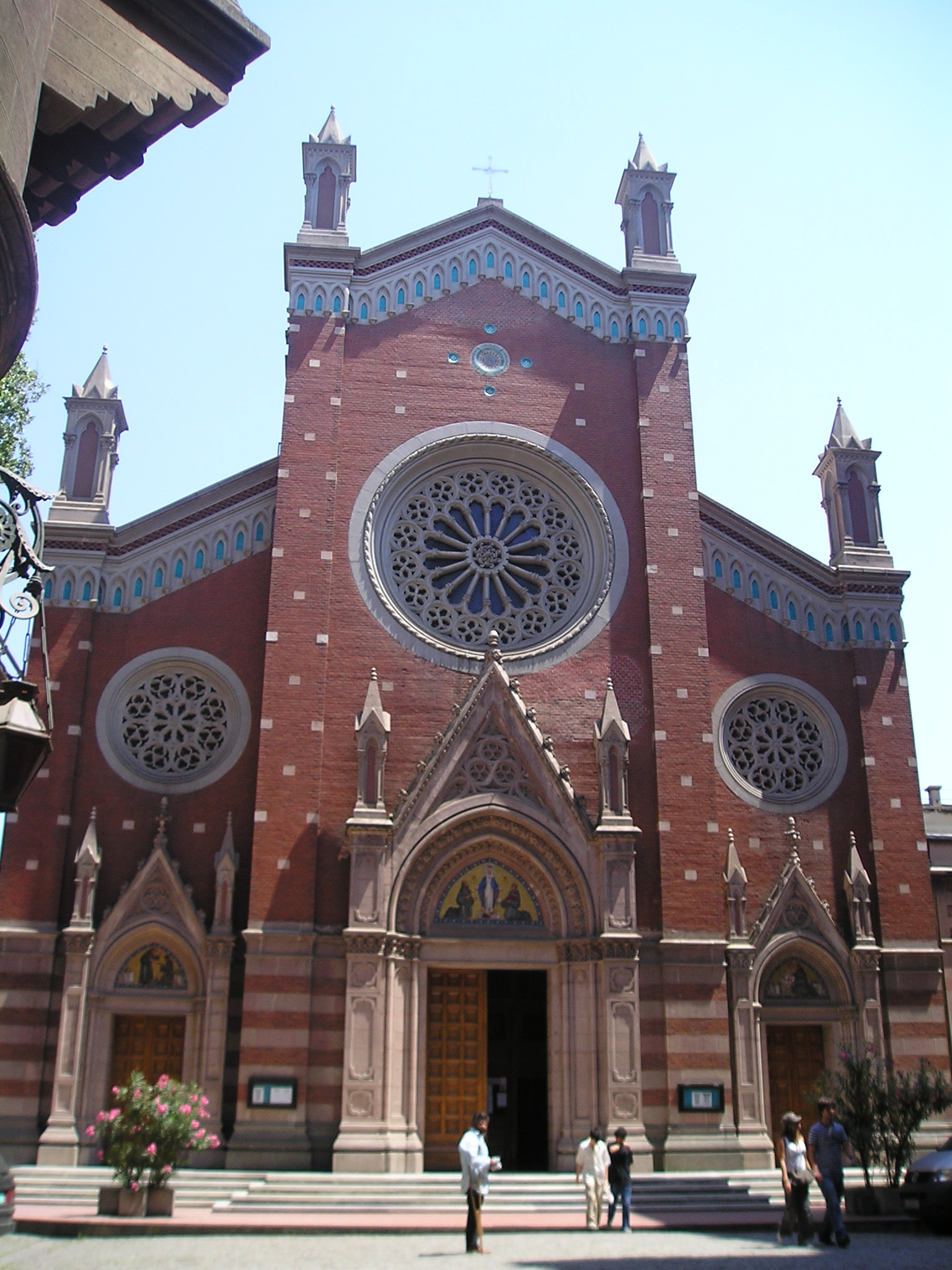
Church of St. Anthony of Padua

Periodically, hunger riots broke out in the city, residents tried to seize food warehouses and grain trains by force, besieged bakeries during bread deliveries, causing terrible crushes with tragic consequences. In April 1915, the Young Turks, seeking to eliminate any possibility of protest, arrested in Istanbul all somewhat significant public and political figures from the capital's Armenians (parliament deputies, journalists, priests, writers, poets, doctors, lawyers, musicians, scientists). They were transported on ships, after which they were deported to Anatolia. In 1916, the Ottoman authorities blew up the Russian Orthodox church in San Stefano, closed by them in 1914. Also during the war, three churches in Galata belonging to the Brotherhood of Russian Monasteries on Athos established in 1896 were closed (the metochions of St. Panteleimon Monastery, St. Elijah and St. Andrew Sketes were built in the 1880s–1890s for Russian pilgrims). The premises of the metochions were given to the barracks of the Turkish army and partially looted. In addition, at the end of 1914, the Russian Archaeological Institute in Constantinople, established in 1894 at the initiative of the prominent Byzantinist Fyodor Uspensky, was closed. Mehmed V died in Istanbul in July 1918, after which his younger brother Mehmed VI ascended the Ottoman throne.

== Mehmed VI and Abdulmejid II's era ==
The war ended in catastrophe for the Ottoman Empire; the Turkish army suffered defeat on all fronts and was severely demoralized. In October 1918, the government of Grand Vizier Talaat Pasha resigned, and an armistice was signed between Turkey and the Entente powers, which effectively meant the capitulation of the Ottoman Empire. In November 1918, British, French, Italian, and Greek ships of the Allied squadron anchored opposite the Dolmabahçe Palace. The forts in the straits were occupied by British troops. Soldiers of the British, French, and Italian garrisons landed in Istanbul, beginning the long occupation of the city. Mass arrests of opposition-oriented political, trade union, and soldiers' leaders were carried out in the capital. In December 1918, the sultan dissolved the chamber of deputies and appointed his brother-in-law Ferid Pasha as grand vizier; then the authorities closed political and public organizations, unions and clubs, as well as some scientific and educational societies, banned any rallies and gatherings, and introduced strict censorship in the press. The Black Sea straits and the puppet government of the sultan came under full control of the victors. The police and gendarmerie of Istanbul came under the command of a British general who commanded the Allied garrison in the Ottoman capital.

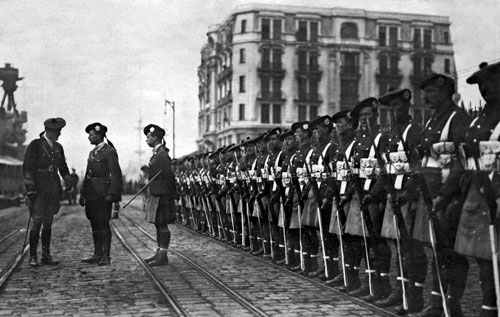
British occupation troops in Galata

In February 1919, the French general Franchet d'Espèrey arrived in Istanbul, after which the capital was divided into three occupation zones: the French were responsible for the old city, the British — for Pera and Galata, the Italians — for Üsküdar. Soon in Istanbul, the most active members of the first communist group created at the end of 1918 among transport workers were arrested. On May 15, 1919, under the protection of the Entente fleet, Greek troops landed in İzmir, which caused a wave of public indignation. By this time, there were 30 thousand British and more than 24 thousand French military personnel in Istanbul, and an Allied squadron with marine detachments on board stood at anchor. The struggle against the interveners and the sultan's government was led by General Mustafa Kemal and Colonel İsmet Bey (meetings of the future leaders of the national liberation movement took place in Kemal's house in the Şişli district and in İsmet Bey's house in the Süleymaniye district).

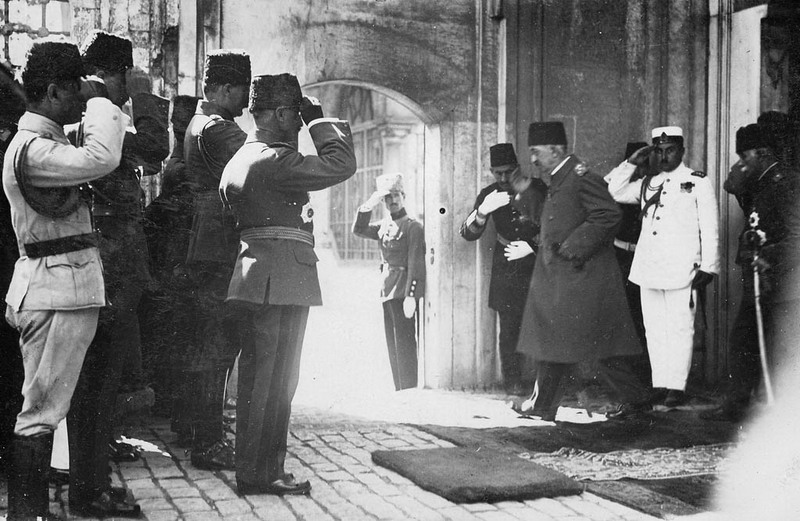
The last sultan leaves the Dolmabahçe Palace through the back entrance. November 1922

In 1919–1921, as a result of the so-called "White emigration", several waves of Russian emigrants arrived in Istanbul — officers and soldiers of the White Army, entrepreneurs, priests, representatives of the intelligentsia, and their family members (in total, up to 250 thousand people ended up in Turkey, most of them in Istanbul). Dozens of refugee camps were created in the suburbs of the capital and on the Princes' Islands, which were under the control of the English and French administrations. Part of the emigrants lived in Galata, in the Andreevsky, Ilyinsky, and Panteleimonovsky metochions, which before the revolution served as a shelter for Orthodox pilgrims heading to Jerusalem and Athos, as well as for clergy coming to the Constantinople patriarch. Russian emigrants created not only kindergartens, primary schools, gymnasiums, hospitals, and churches, but also private music schools, ballet studios, and theaters; they conducted research on Istanbul's Byzantine heritage. Some Russian emigrants moonlighted as artists and musicians, opened gambling houses, and engaged in the forgery and sale of ancient artifacts and Byzantine icons. Later, the majority of Russian emigrants left Turkey for European countries.

On January 12, 1920, the opening session of the newly elected chamber of deputies took place in Istanbul, in which the majority of seats were won by Kemal's supporters. On February 23, a British squadron appeared at anchor in the capital; on March 2, the government of Grand Vizier Ali Rıza Pasha resigned, and on March 10, the British military authorities began arrests among the most active nationalist deputies. In the night from March 15 to 16, 1920, detachments of British marines occupied all government buildings, the post office and telegraph, barracks and military depots, and also took the sultan's palace under their protection. Martial law was introduced in the city, the chamber of deputies was dispersed, and many deputies and political figures were exiled to Malta. Repressions began among the townspeople, whom the occupation authorities and their military tribunal suspected of connections with partisans. Machine guns were installed on many minarets, becoming a symbol of the occupation regime. In the same 1920, a fire completed the centuries-long destruction of the building of the former Studion Monastery.

In November 1920, after the defeat and evacuation of the Russian Army of Wrangel, the largest wave of refugees from Russia arrived in the city (according to various data, from 145 thousand to 150 thousand people), including several bishops of the Temporary Higher Church Administration of Southeastern Russia headed by Metropolitan Anthony (Khrapovitsky). However, already in the following year, the church hierarchs of the Higher Russian Church Administration Abroad (VRTSU) established in Istanbul relocated to Serbia, where they formed the Russian Orthodox Church Outside Russia. In the future, especially from 1924, the exodus of Russian emigrants and clergy was partly influenced by the cooling of relations with the Constantinople Patriarchate, which loyally related to the Soviet power, partly by the cessation of food aid to refugees by the French and the ultimatum of the Turkish authorities on the mass deportation of military personnel (if at the end of 1921 there were 30 thousand Russians in Istanbul, then in the fall of 1922 — 18 thousand, at the beginning of 1924 — 10 thousand, in 1926 — 5 thousand).

Map of Ottoman Istanbul

On September 9, 1922, Turkish troops captured Smyrna, on which occasion a grand rally and numerous solemn services took place in Istanbul. The Turkish army was moving towards the capital, and open protests against the occupation authorities began in the city, often escalating into armed clashes between demonstrators and police. British units from Egypt, Malta, and Cyprus, reinforced with tanks, artillery, and aviation, were transferred to Istanbul. On October 15, 1922, the armistice agreement between Ankara and the Entente came into force, according to which Allied troops remained in Istanbul and the straits zone until the conclusion of a peace treaty. On November 1, 1922, the Grand National Assembly of Turkey abolished the sultanate and decided to initiate a criminal case accusing Sultan Mehmed VI of high treason. On November 17, the last reigning monarch of the House of Osman fled the capital to Malta aboard the British battleship "Malaya" (he died in 1926 in Italy and was buried in Damascus). The title of caliph passed to Abdulmejid II, son of Sultan Abdulaziz (in March 1924, the Turkish authorities abolished the caliphate and exiled all members of the House of Osman from the country).

In May 1923, at the initiative of Patriarch Meletius, the Pan-Orthodox Congress began in Istanbul, which laid the beginning of important but quite controversial reforms (in particular, the church calendar reform led to a schism among the local churches). Only after the signing of the Lausanne Peace Treaty in the summer of 1923 did the Allied occupation troops evacuate from Istanbul (on October 6, 1923, the last foreign soldier left the city). After the deportation in 1923 of 1.5 million Orthodox Greeks, the influence of the Constantinople Patriarchate in Turkey effectively reduced to the scale of Istanbul and several islands in the Aegean Sea. On October 13, 1923, Ankara was declared the capital of Turkey, and on October 29, the Grand National Assembly of Turkey adopted a law proclaiming the republic, the first president of which became Mustafa Kemal.

== See also ==
- History of Constantinople

== Bibliography ==
=== In Russian ===
- Vitol, A. V. (1987). Османская империя: начало XVIII в [The Ottoman Empire: Early 18th Century]. Moscow: Nauka. Main Editorial Office of Eastern Literature.
- Dubnov, S. M. (2003). Краткая история евреев [A Short History of the Jews]. Rostov-on-Don: Feniks. ISBN 5-222-03451-8.
- Komandorova, N. I. (2009). Русский Стамбул [Russian Istanbul]. Veche. ISBN 978-5953337472.
- Kosminsky, E. A. (1952). История Средних веков [History of the Middle Ages]. Moscow: State Publishing House of Political Literature.
- Crowley, Roger (2008). Константинополь: Последняя осада. 1453 [Constantinople: The Last Siege. 1453]. Moscow: AST Moscow. ISBN 978-5-9713-9418-1.
- Lang, David (2004). Армяне. Народ-созидатель [The Armenians: A People-Creator]. Moscow: Tsentrpoligraf. ISBN 5-9524-0954-7.
- Mantran, Robert (2006). Повседневная жизнь Стамбула в эпоху Сулеймана Великолепного [Everyday Life in Istanbul during the Era of Suleiman the Magnificent]. Living History: Everyday Life of Humanity. Moscow: Molodaya Gvardiya. ISBN 5-235-02803-1.
- Meyer, M. S.; Oreshkova, S. F. (1986). Османская империя: система государственного управления, социальные и этнорелигиозные проблемы [The Ottoman Empire: System of State Administration, Social and Ethnoreligious Issues]. Moscow: Nauka.
- Meyer, M. S. (1984). Османская империя в первой четверти XVII века: сборник документов и материалов [The Ottoman Empire in the First Quarter of the 17th Century: Collection of Documents and Materials]. Moscow: Nauka. Main Editorial Office of Eastern Literature.
- Petrosyan, Yu. A.; Yusupov, A. R. (1977). Город на двух континентах [City on Two Continents]. Moscow: Nauka. Main Editorial Office of Eastern Literature.
- Rakhmanaliev, Rustan (2009). Империя тюрков. Великая цивилизация [The Empire of the Turks: A Great Civilization]. Moscow: Ripol-klassik. ISBN 978-5-386-00847-5.

=== In English ===
- Bon, Ottaviano; Withers, Robert (1996). The Sultan's Seraglio: An Intimate Portrait of Life at the Ottoman Court. London: Saqi Books.
- Boyar, Ebru; Fleet, Kate (2010). A Social History of Ottoman Istanbul. Cambridge: Cambridge University Press. ISBN 978-0-521-13623-5.
- Clark, Peter (2010). Istanbul: a cultural and literary history. Oxford: Signal Books. ISBN 978-1904955764.
- Çelik, Zeynep (1986). The Remaking of Istanbul: Portrait of an Ottoman City in the Nineteenth Century. Berkeley: University of California Press. ISBN 9780520082397.
- Duben, Alan; Behar, Cem (2002). Istanbul Households: Marriage, Family and Fertility, 1880-1940. Cambridge: Cambridge University Press. ISBN 0-521-52303-6.
- Faroqhi, Suraiya (2005). Subjects of the Sultan: Culture and Daily Life in the Ottoman Empire. London: I.B. Tauris. ISBN 1850437602.
- Faroqhi, Suraiya (2006). The Cambridge History of Turkey: The Later Ottoman Empire, 1603—1839. Cambridge: Cambridge University Press. ISBN 0-521-62-095-3.
- Freely, John (2011). A History of Ottoman Architecture. Ashurst Lodge: WIT Press. ISBN 978-1-84-564-506-9.
- Freely, John (1999). Inside the Seraglio: private lives of the Sultans in Istanbul. New York: Viking. ISBN 0670878391.
- Eldem, Edhem (1999). French Trade in Istanbul in the Eighteenth Century. Leiden: BRILL. ISBN 90-04-11353-3.
- Kohen, Elli (2007). History of the Turkish Jews and Sephardim: Memories of a Past Golden Age. Lanham: University Press of America. ISBN 978-0-7618-3601-8.
- Lewis, Bernard (1963). Istanbul and the Civilization of the Ottoman Empire. Norman: University of Oklahoma Press.
- Ousterhout, Robert G. (2007). Studies on Istanbul and Beyond. Philadelphia: University of Pennsylvania Museum of Archaeology, American Research Institute in Turkey. ISBN 978-1-934536-01-8.
- Rozen, Minna (2010). A History of the Jewish Community in Istanbul. Leiden: BRILL. ISBN 978-90-04-18-589-0.
- Taylor, Jane (2007). Imperial Istanbul: A Traveller's Guide. London: I.B. Tauris. ISBN 978-1845113346.
- Zarinebaf, Fariba (2010). Crime and Punishment in Istanbul: 1700-1800. Berkeley: University of California Press. ISBN 978-0-520-26221-8.
- Wood, Alfred (2006). A History of the Levant Company. London: Oxford University Press. ISBN 0-7146-1384-3.`
